= Subaru Legacy =

Mid-sized car by Subaru

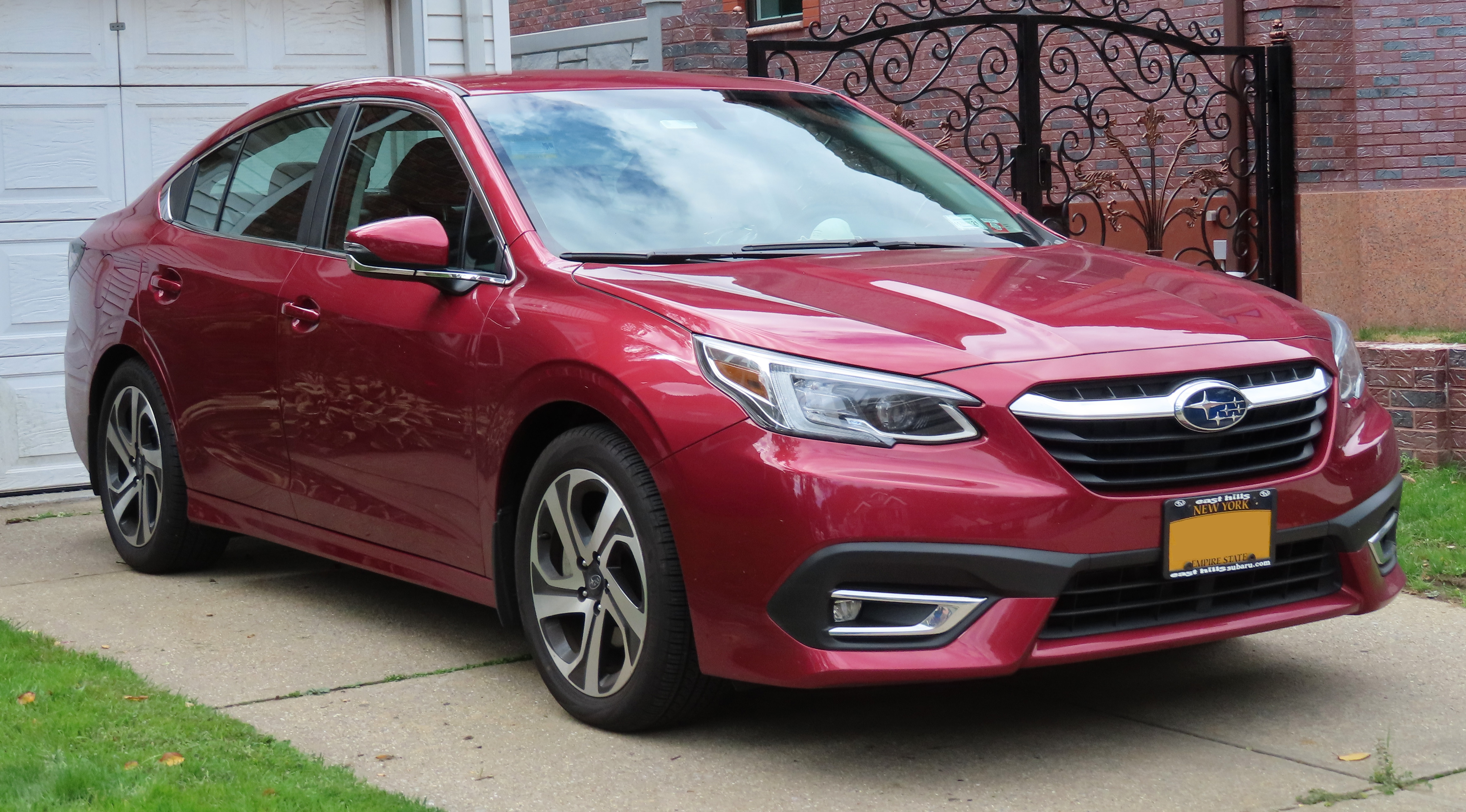
- 2020 Subaru Legacy (United States)

Overview
- Manufacturer: Subaru
- Also called: Subaru Liberty (Australia, until 2020); Subaru B4 (Israel); Isuzu Aska (first generation only)
- Production: 1989–2020 (worldwide); 1989–2025 (North America)
- Model years: 1990–2025 (North America)
- Assembly: Japan: Ōta, Gunma (Yajima plant; 1989–2020); United States: Lafayette, Indiana (Lafayette plant)

Body and chassis
- Class: Mid-size car / Compact executive car
- Body style: 4-door sedan 5-door station wagon
- Layout: Front-engine, front-wheel-drive (1989–1999); Front-engine, all-wheel-drive (1989–2025)

Chronology
- Successor: Subaru Outback (wagon model); Subaru Levorg (wagon model)

The Subaru Legacy (Japanese: スバル・レガシィ, Hepburn: Subaru Regashi) was a mid-size car built by Japanese automobile manufacturer Subaru from 1989 to 2025. The maker's flagship car, it is unique in its class for offering all-wheel drive as a standard feature, and Subaru's traditional boxer engine.

In 1996, a variant of the Legacy with heightened suspension called the Legacy Outback was introduced to compete in the burgeoning sport-utility vehicle class, and proved to be a sales success for Subaru. The Outback line was split into its own model in 2000, known as the Subaru Outback.

As of 2008, 3.6 million Legacy models have been built since its 1989 introduction.

Production of the Legacy ended in Japan in June 2020, with the sixth-generation Legacy being the last model produced and marketed in Japan. Subaru of America announced in an internal email that 2025 will be the last model year for the Subaru Legacy. The Subaru Outback will remain in production, after being the company's top selling model in 2023.

The Legacy was sold as the Liberty in Australia out of deference to Legacy Australia, an organisation dedicated to caring for the families of military service veterans.

== First generation (BC/BF/BJ; 1989) ==
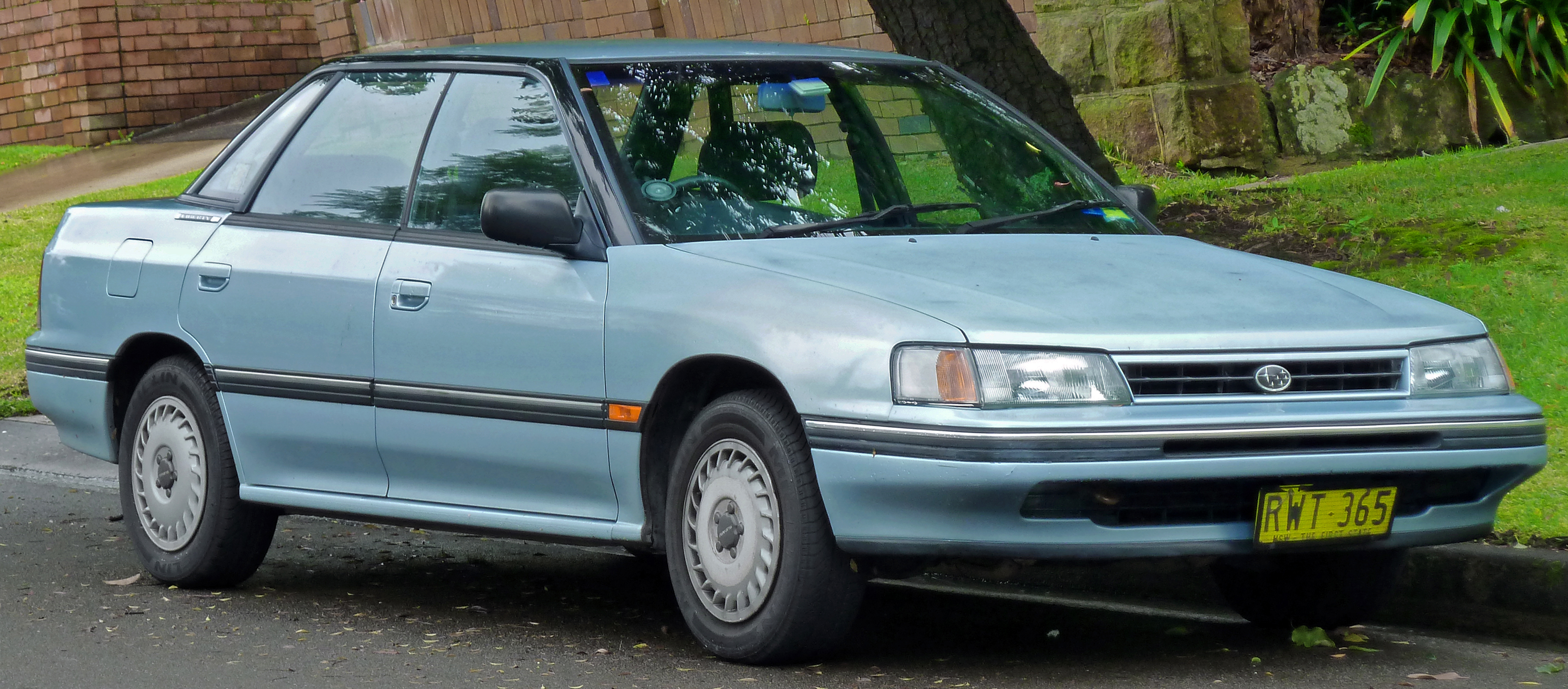

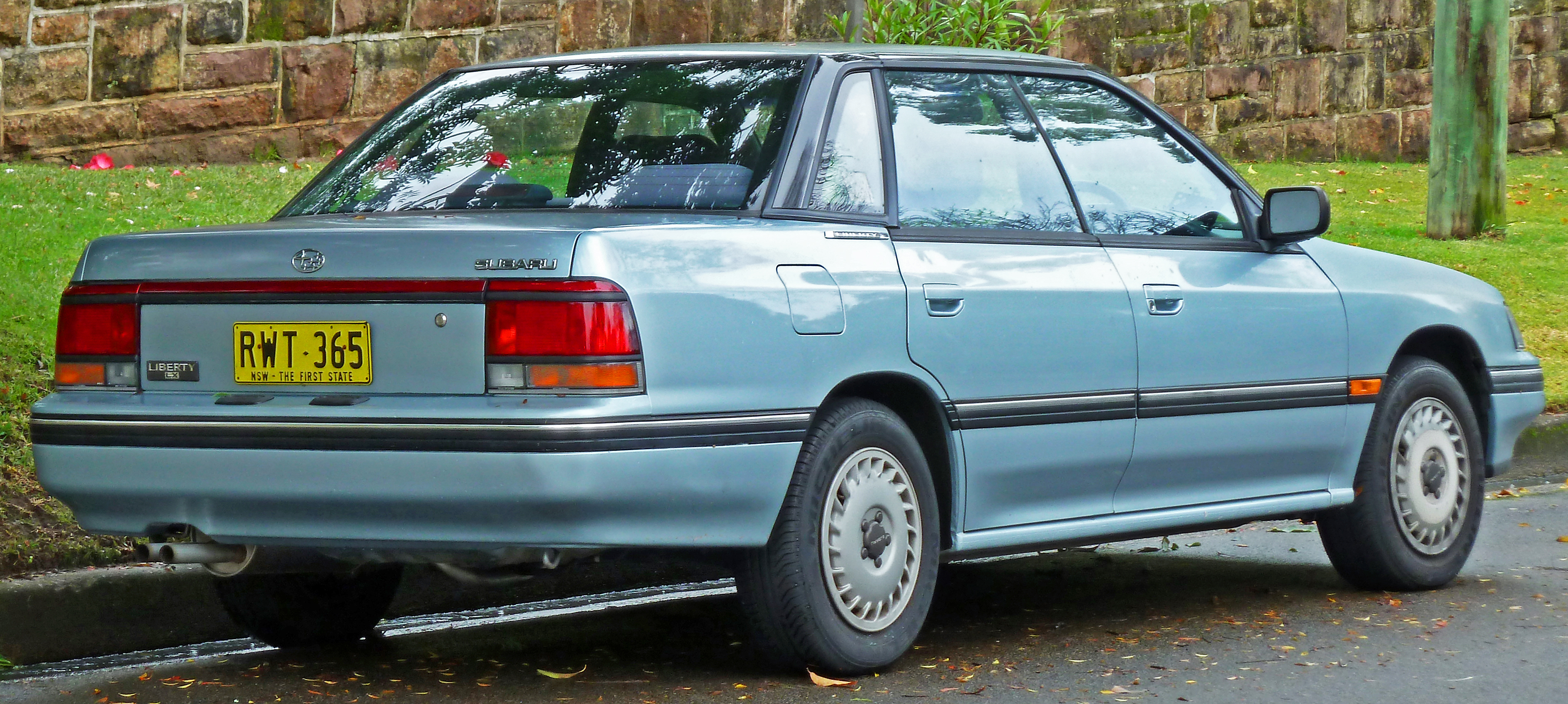
Subaru Liberty sedan (BC; pre-facelift)

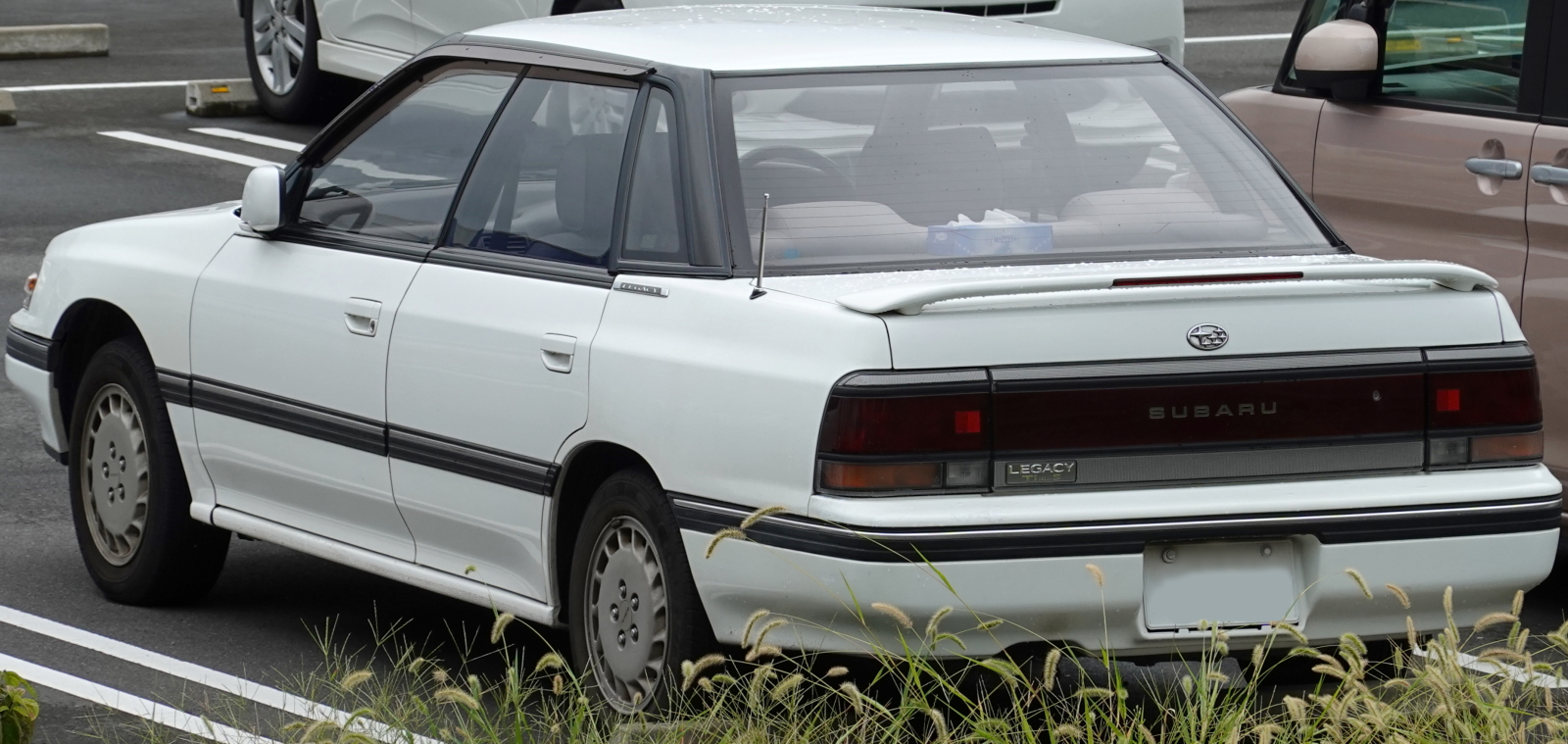
Subaru Legacy Ti (with bumper mounted plate)

The Legacy was introduced in 1989 to provide Subaru a vehicle to compete in the lucrative North American mid-size market against the Honda Accord, Toyota Camry, Mazda 626, and Nissan Stanza. It was an all-new model, and positioned above the Leone, XT, Justy, and kei cars Rex and Sambar in Subaru's model range at the time. The Legacy also introduced an entirely new flat-4 engine series, called the EJ engine, which was quieter and more powerful than the previous EA engine.

The Legacy began with a 5-door wagon or 4-door sedan body styles with FWD and an optional full-time AWD package, and was introduced in North America, the UK, Germany, the Benelux region of Northern Europe, Japan and Australia (where it was called Liberty because the name Legacy conflicted with Legacy Australia). Options included 4-channel ABS, licensed from Bosch and air suspension height control, which allowed the driver to increase the vehicle's ground clearance for off-road conditions. It was formally released January 23, 1989 in Japan, with an introductory price of ¥2,550,000 for the turbocharged RS (approx. USD $18,800 at 1989 yen exchange rate). The first Legacy was available at Japanese dealerships on February 1, 1989, with worldwide distribution starting in 1990.

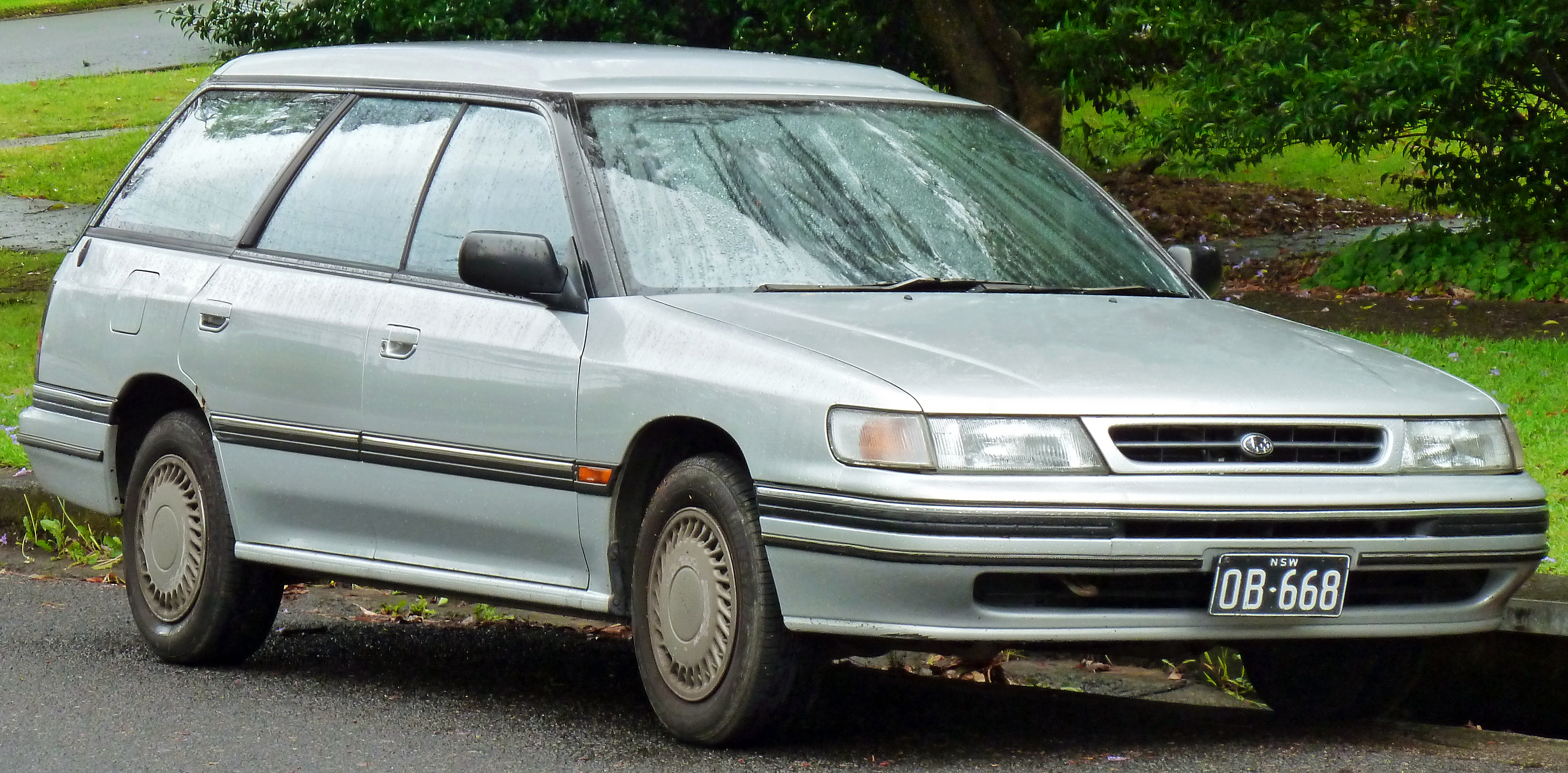

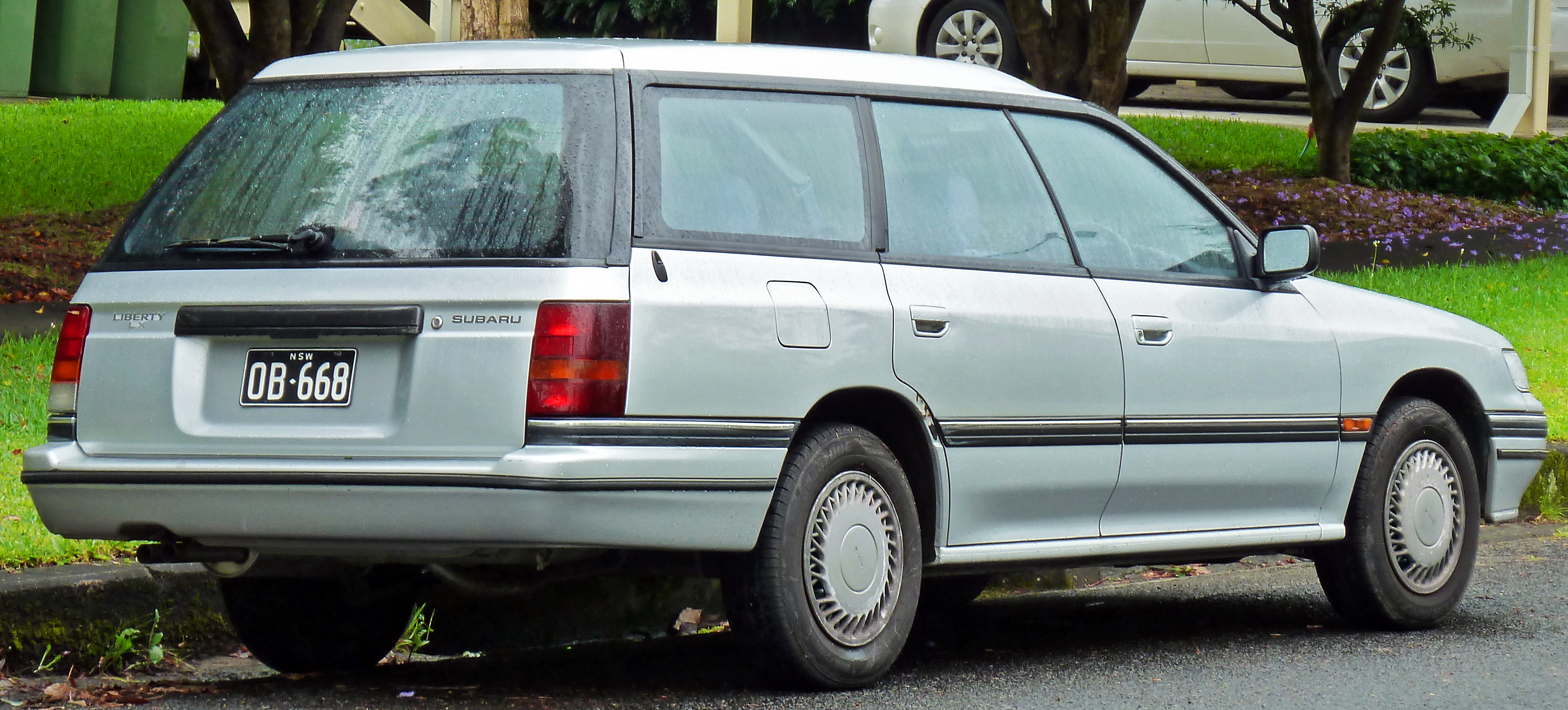
Subaru Liberty station wagon (BF; facelift)

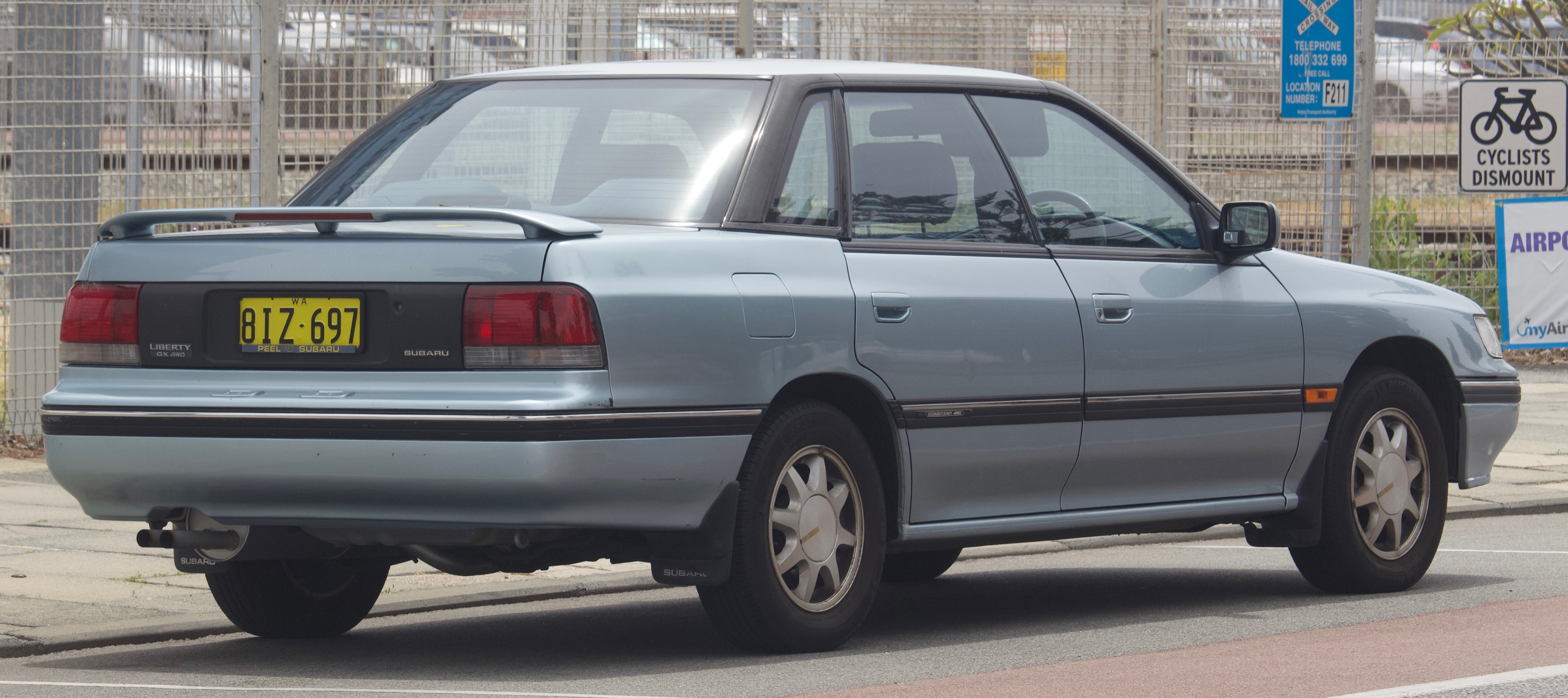
Subaru Liberty sedan (BC; facelift)

Many different options of engine and transmission were available depending on the market. 1.8 SOHC, 2.0 SOHC, DOHC, DOHC turbo, 2.2 SOHC with most being EFI. FWD, AWD and AWD dual range (manual only) transmissions were used. JDM market GTs equipped with the DOHC EJ20T (the most powerful variant offered) had additional options such as leather interior, climate control air conditioning, electric seats and keyless entry via entering a code via the driver's door handle.

The US-spec included the passive restraints (motorized seat belts) through the 1994 model year with exception to the right hand drive Postal model which was only available with conventional seat belts. Driver's side airbags were an option midway through the 1992 model year and became standard in 1993. Passenger airbags weren't available until the 2nd generation arrived in 1995.

The US models included the Legacy Sport Sedan, from 1991 to 1994 and Legacy LE Touring Wagon from 1992 to 1994. Both were turbocharged with the EJ22T closed-deck block engine. Unique to the US market, it was SOHC, with different pistons, oil squirters, oil cooler on the '91 model year, and other enhancements. Although it had the same displacement as the non-turbo/naturally aspirated (NA) EJ22E engine used throughout all other Legacy models, it was not simply a turbocharged version of the EJ22E. (As a side-note, the 1994 Legacy GT trim used the non-turbo EJ22E.) The sedan was available with strengthened 4EAT Automatic transmission or a stronger 5-speed manual transmission. These were the last turbocharged Subaru models sold in the US until the 2002 WRX debuted.

Australian specification models started with the basic FWD only LX with manual windows, then the FWD or AWD (manuals were dual range) GX which upgraded to electric windows and cruise control with the wagons also receiving the pneumatic air suspension, with the top of the range Heritage sedan receiving a leather interior. All models were equipped with the SOHC EJ22E except for the sporty EJ20T RS Turbo sedan and wagon which were introduced with the facelift in 1993 as a response to capture sales from the Liberty's rallying success. All wagons were the high roof variant.

These model codes are designated in the VIN of each vehicle, such as "JF1BF3BL0E-":

Legacy Codes

- BC=89–94 Sedan
- BF=89–94 Wagon (raised roof {USA '94 only})
- BJ=89–94 Wagon

== Second generation (BD/BG/BK; 1993) ==
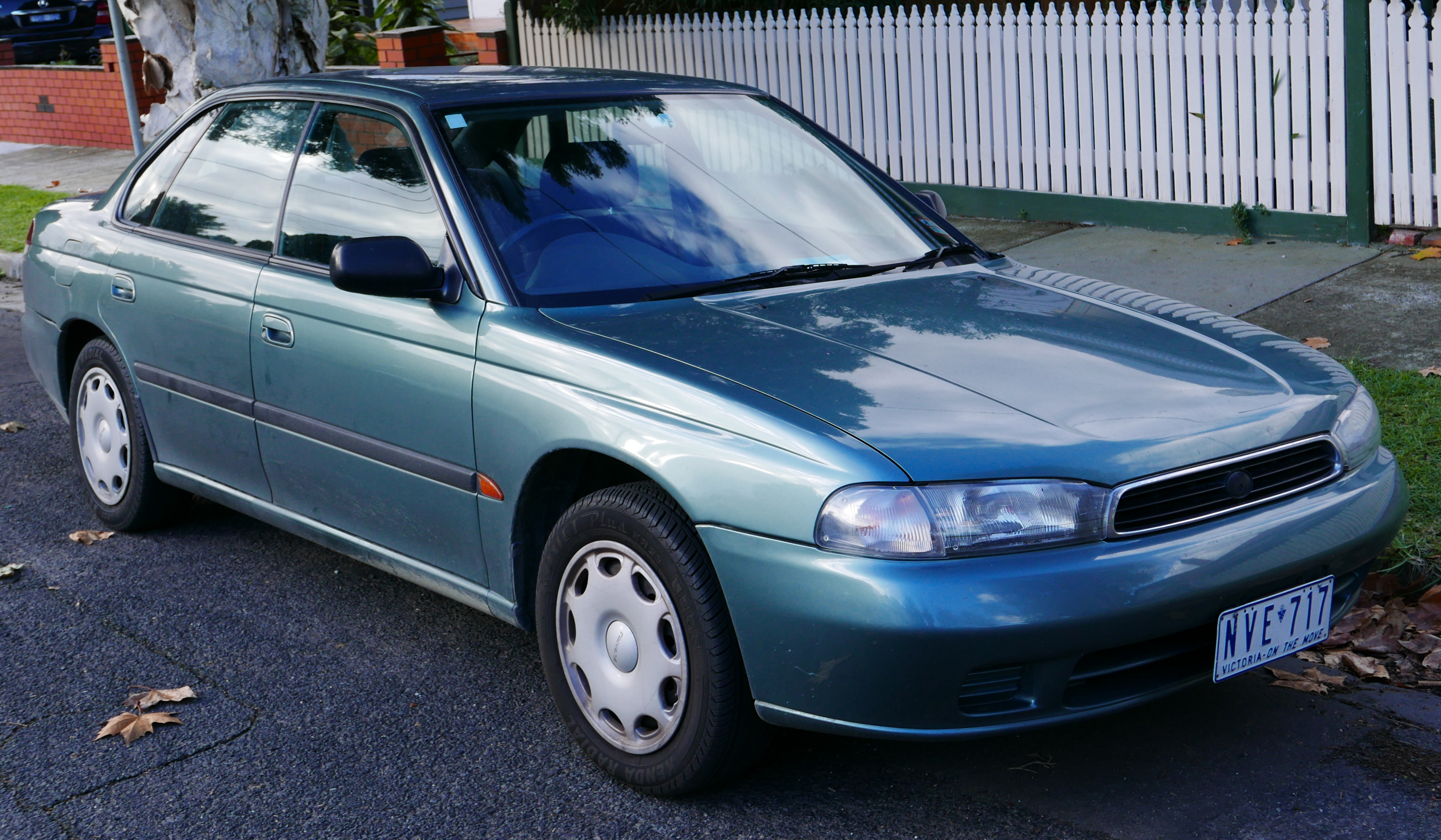

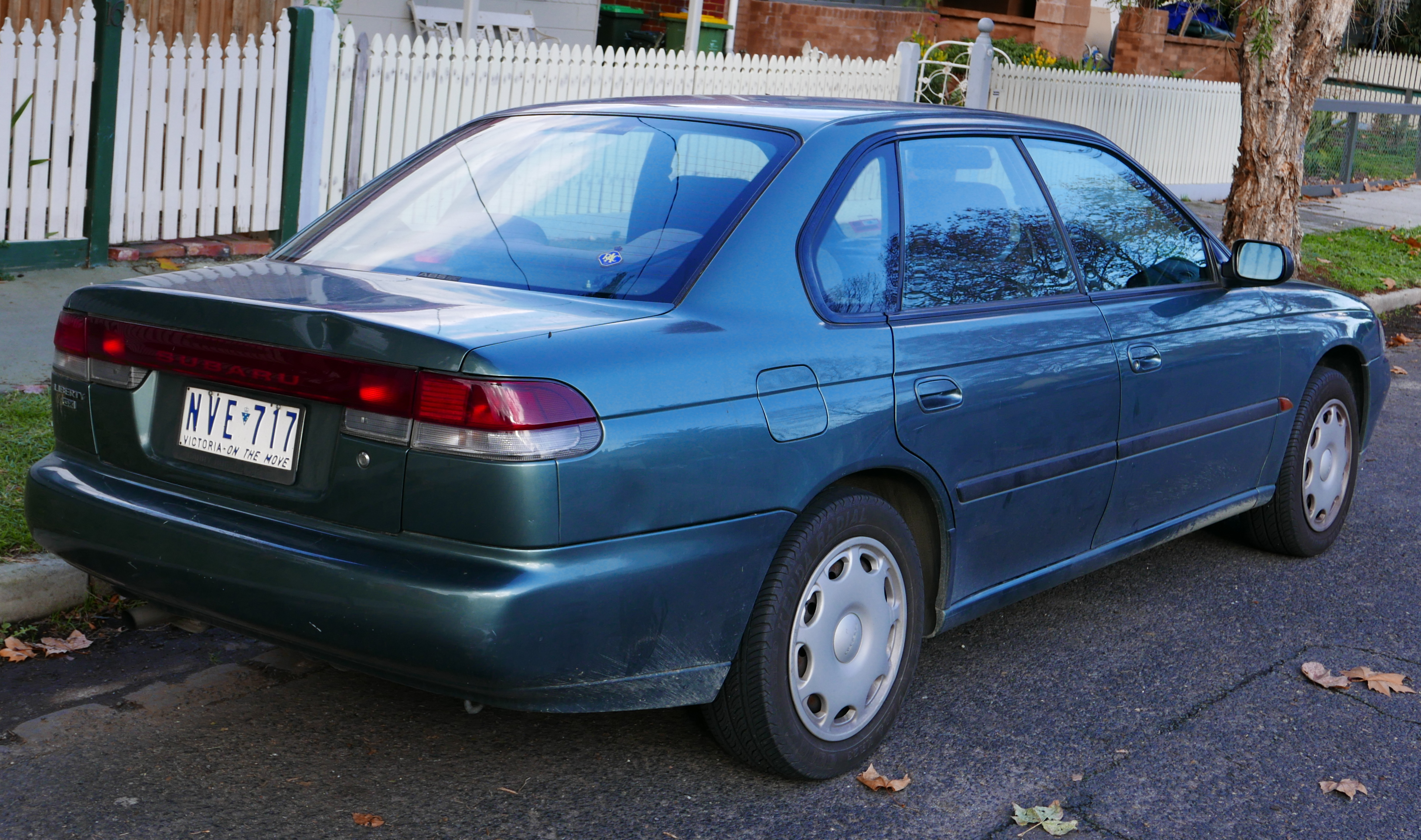
Subaru Liberty sedan (BD)

Second generation sales in Japan began October 7, 1993, with an introductory price of ¥2,753,000 for the twin turbo GT (approx US$25,250 at 1993 yen exchange rate), and an introduction for model year 1995 in North America with a full body and chassis revision. The exterior was designed by Olivier Boulay, who was hired by Subaru on a short-term basis. The tail light appearance on both the sedan and wagon was influenced by the taillights on the SVX. In 1996, Subaru decided to make AWD standard equipment in all vehicles produced for the North American market, which would be the case until 2012. Subaru still offered a choice between FWD and AWD for its domestic market vehicles for this generation. The Outback was introduced with this generation in 1995 as a trim package, then with increased ground clearance and raised roof line in 1996. Only AWD was offered internationally, and the air suspension with height control was no longer offered.

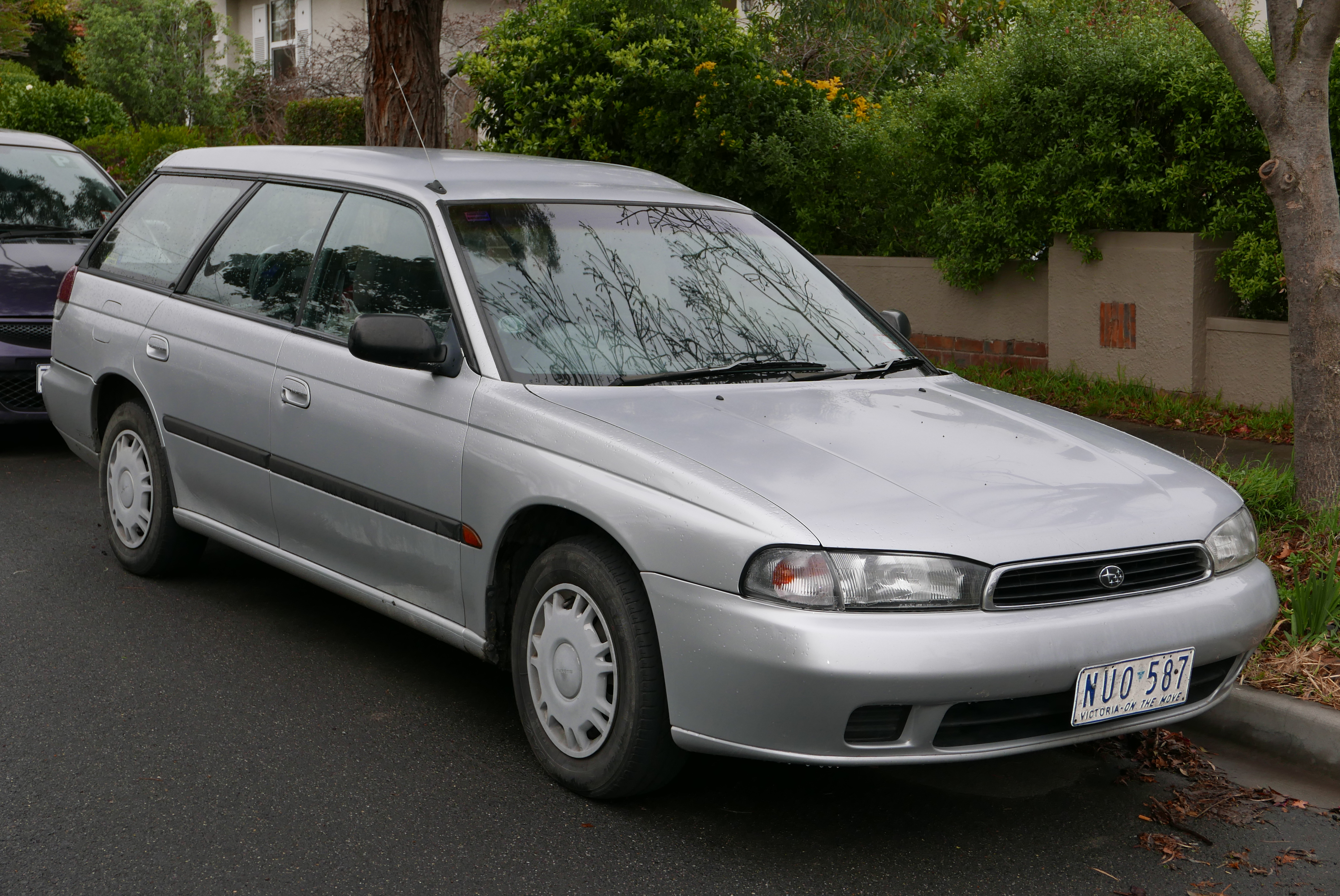

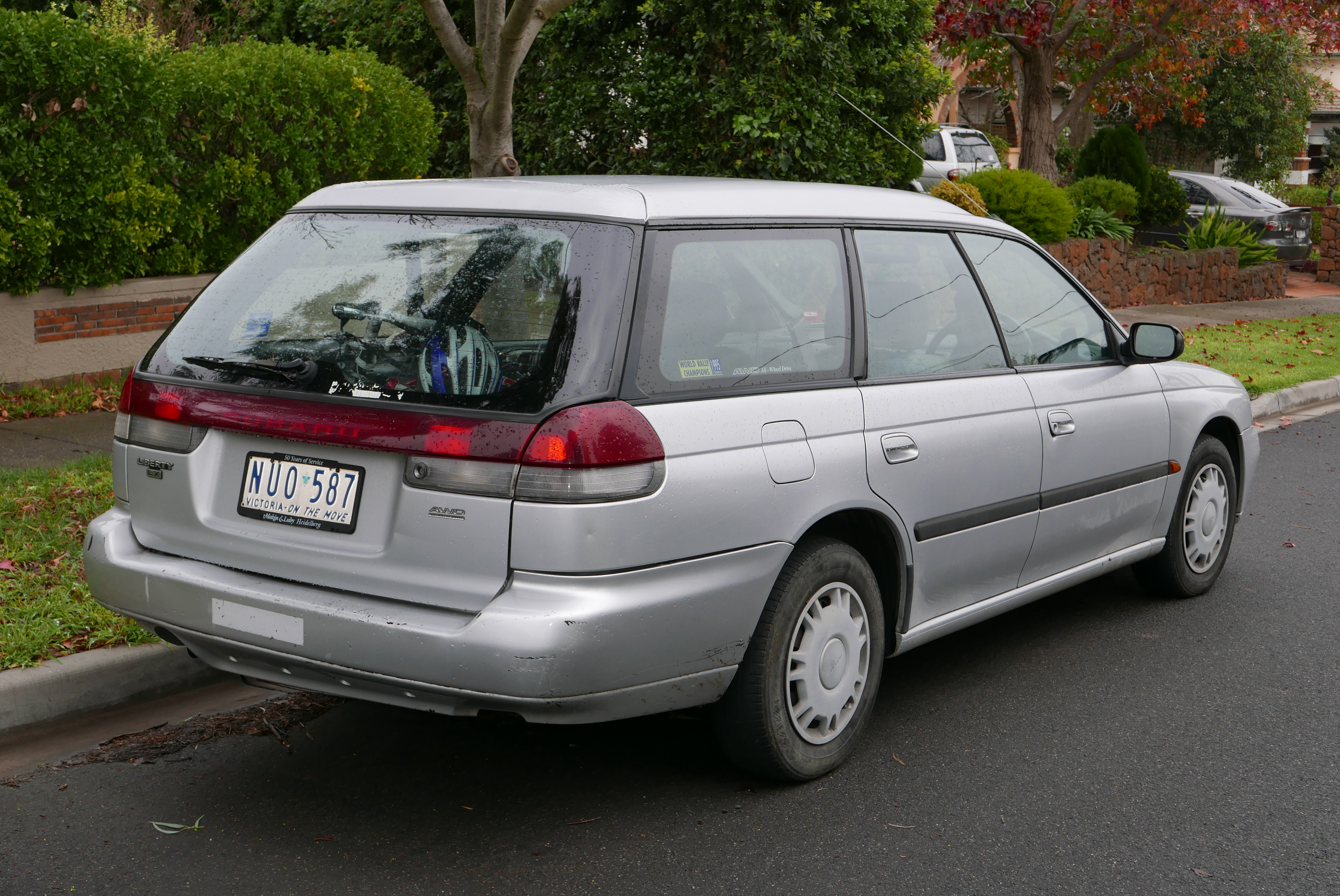
Subaru Liberty station wagon (BG/BK)

US-spec GT models, first offered in 1990 as a turbocharged sedan or wagon in Japan, and as a trim package for the US version in 1994, became a top level model upgrade in 1996, using the new EJ25D DOHC 2.5 L naturally aspirated engine. "Limited" trim level editions were introduced, offering heated leather, or cloth, seats and trim and a tinted, glass moonroof. The term "Limited" appeared on the "GT", known as the "GT Limited" in 1998. The term "Limited" was used by itself on the Outback in 1998. Driver and front passenger airbags were added with the redesigned interior as standard equipment in accordance with US Federal Government regulations. 1999 marked the 30th anniversary of Subaru in America, and the last of the second generation in North America. There was a special 30th Anniversary Edition offered in the US with upgraded interior and sunroof, spoiler, alloy wheels on the "L" trim level cars. The US-spec "Brighton" trim level also carried over from the facelifted first generation version that was priced below the "L" trim option.

In Japan, the GT/B-Spec was introduced in 1994 with lowered and stiffened suspension and a higher performance rear differential. The next generation of the GT-B was introduced June 1996, with the front and rear struts supplied by Bilstein, with the upgrade also available on the RS. The "B" designation stood for Bilstein. Turbocharged versions continued to be available in markets that used right-hand-drive configurations. Specialty touring and racing versions were available in Japan, as well as the DOHC 2-litre twin sequential turbocharged EJ20H version on both the Legacy GT sedan and wagon with an automatic transmission and the RS sedan and GT-B wagon with the EJ20R and a manual transmission and a slightly higher horsepower rating, both identified as "Boxer 2-stage Twin Turbo" on the engine cover shroud.

For the Australian market, the Subaru Liberty was offered in LX, GX, RX, and Heritage model grades. In 1998 the special edition "Bilstein Edition RX" was offered. It could be identified by a Bilstein badge on the right rear boot lid and a lower stance due to front and rear Bilstein struts. It also featured Leather seats and door inserts along with a MOMO sports leather steering wheel and 16 in BBS alloy wheels as standard equipment.

With the introduction of the Legacy second generation in Israel, the Legacy name was replaced by the B4 brand.

These model codes are designated in the Applied Model code of each vehicle, such as "BD'9A4D":

Legacy Codes

- BD=Sedan; North America 1995–1999, Japan 1993–1997
- BG=Step-roof Wagon; North America 1996–1999 (Outback trim with raised roof), Japan 1993–1997
- BK=Standard-roof Wagon (Used only in North America); North America 1995–1999

== Third generation (BE/BH; 1998) ==
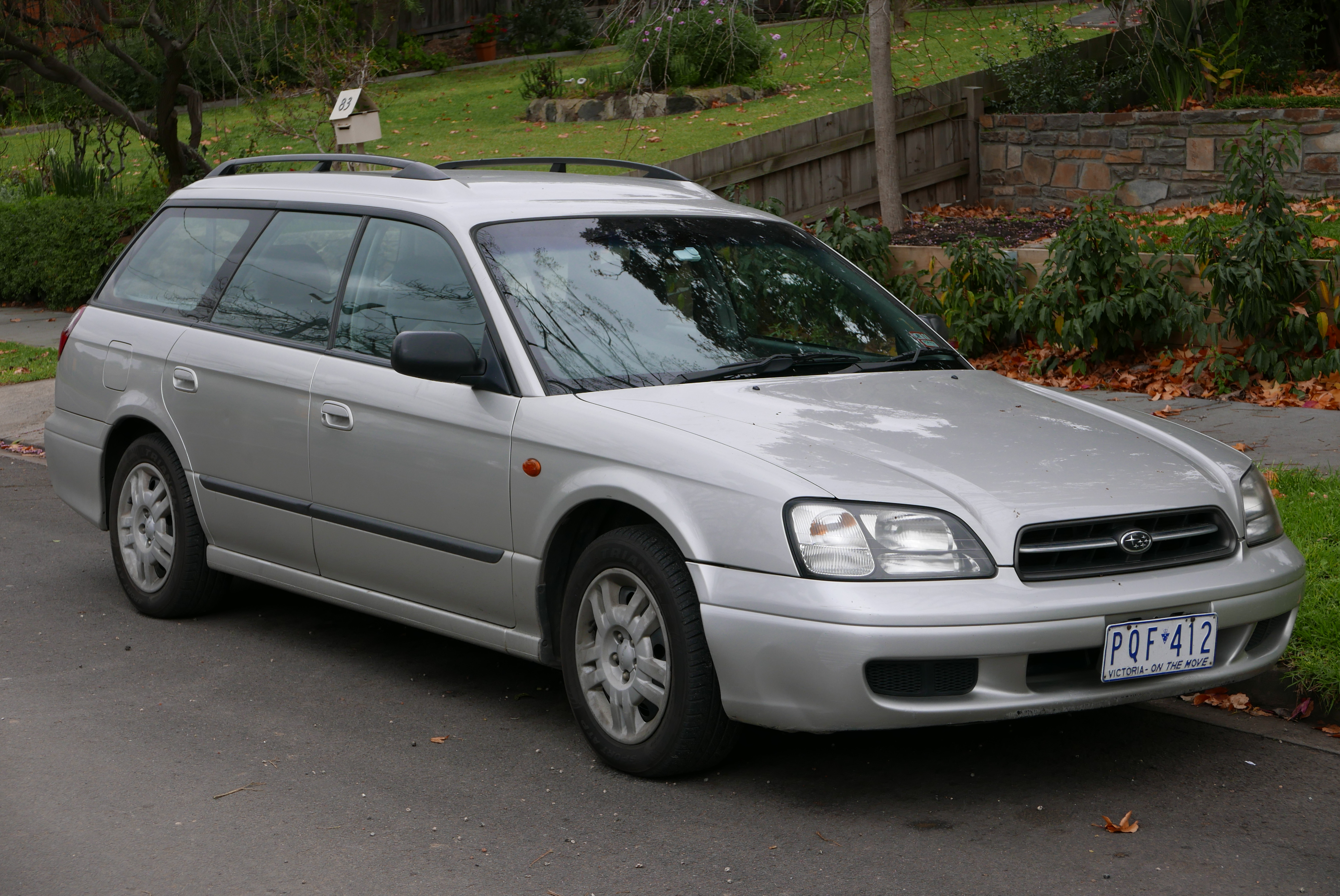

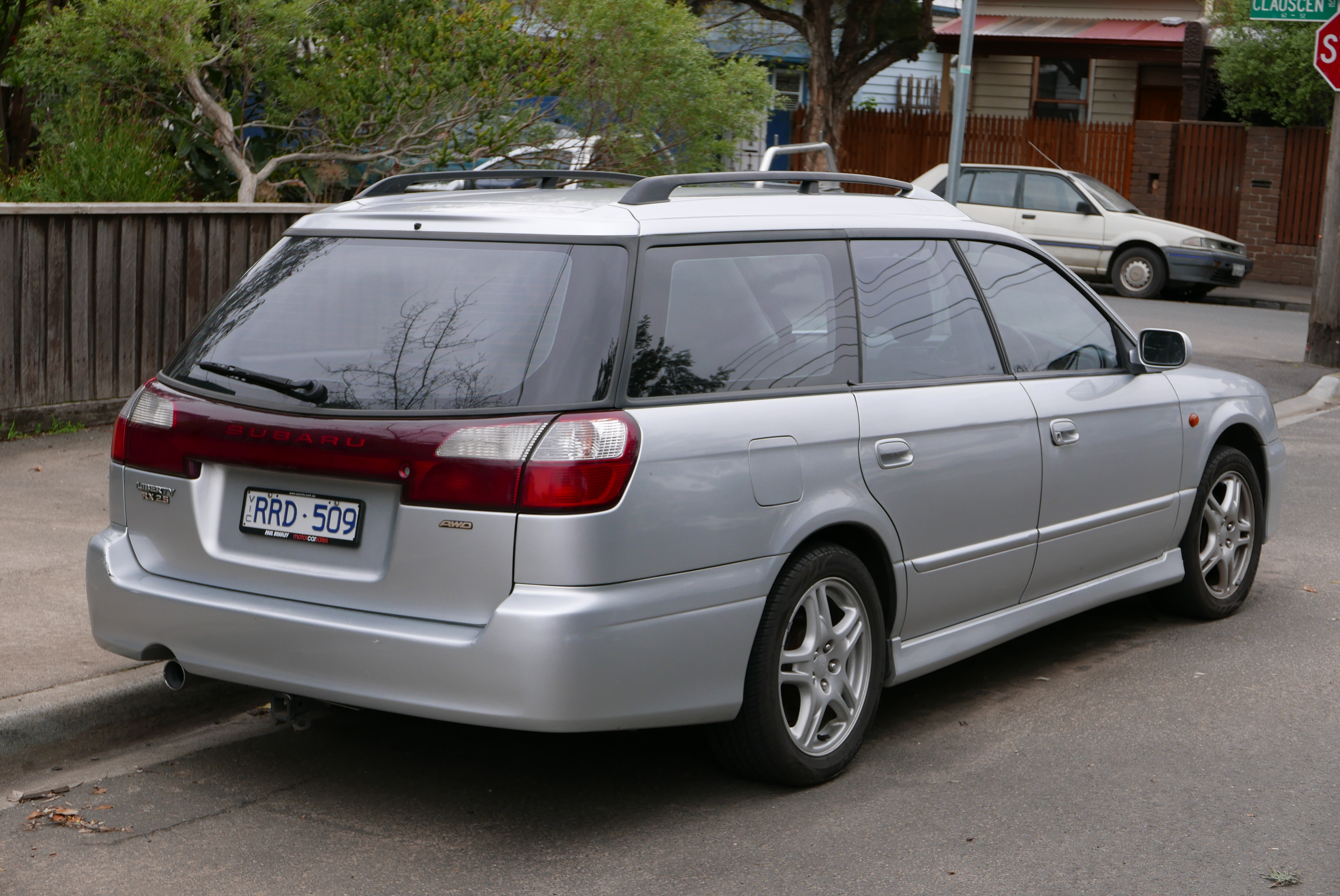
Subaru Liberty station wagon (BH)

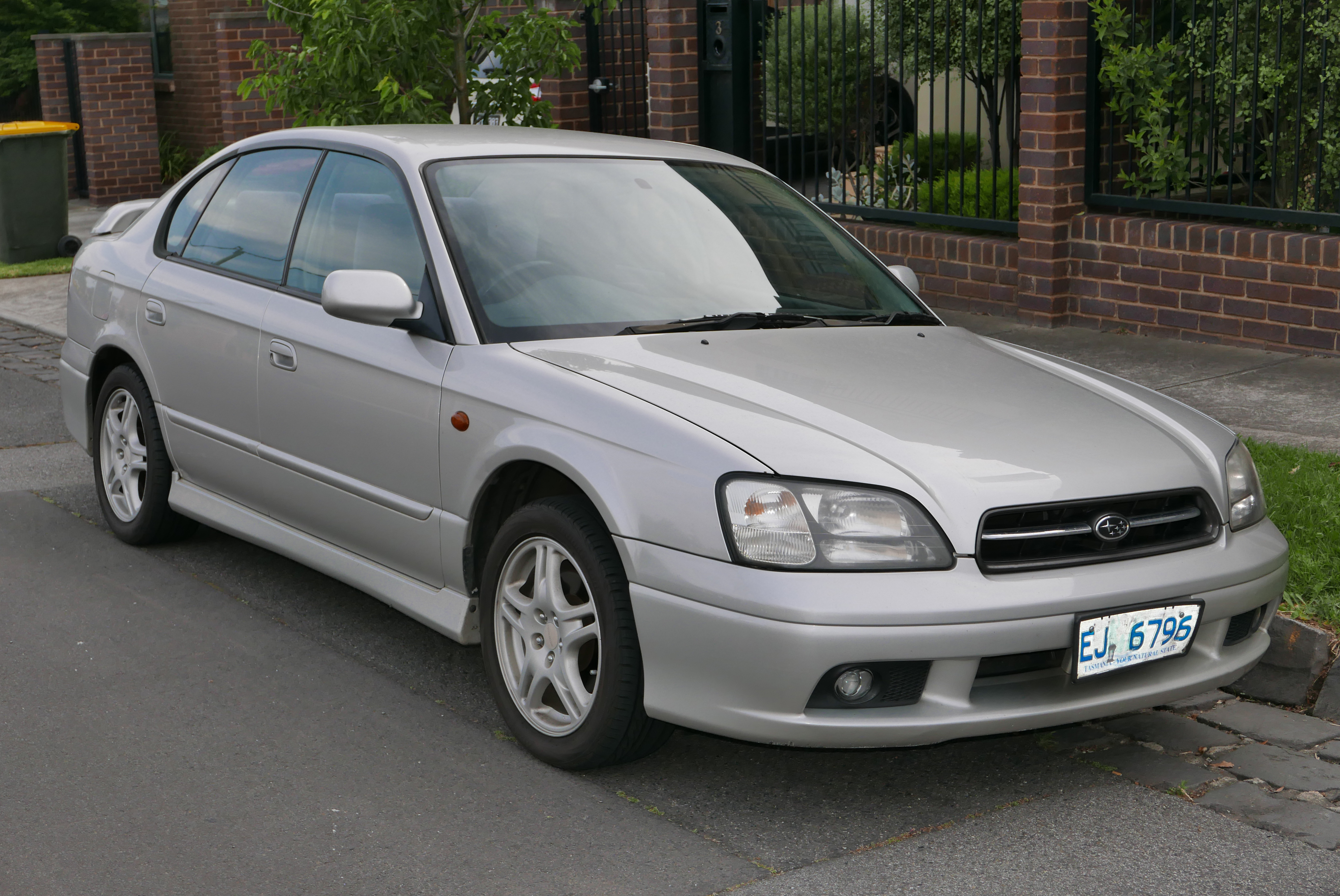

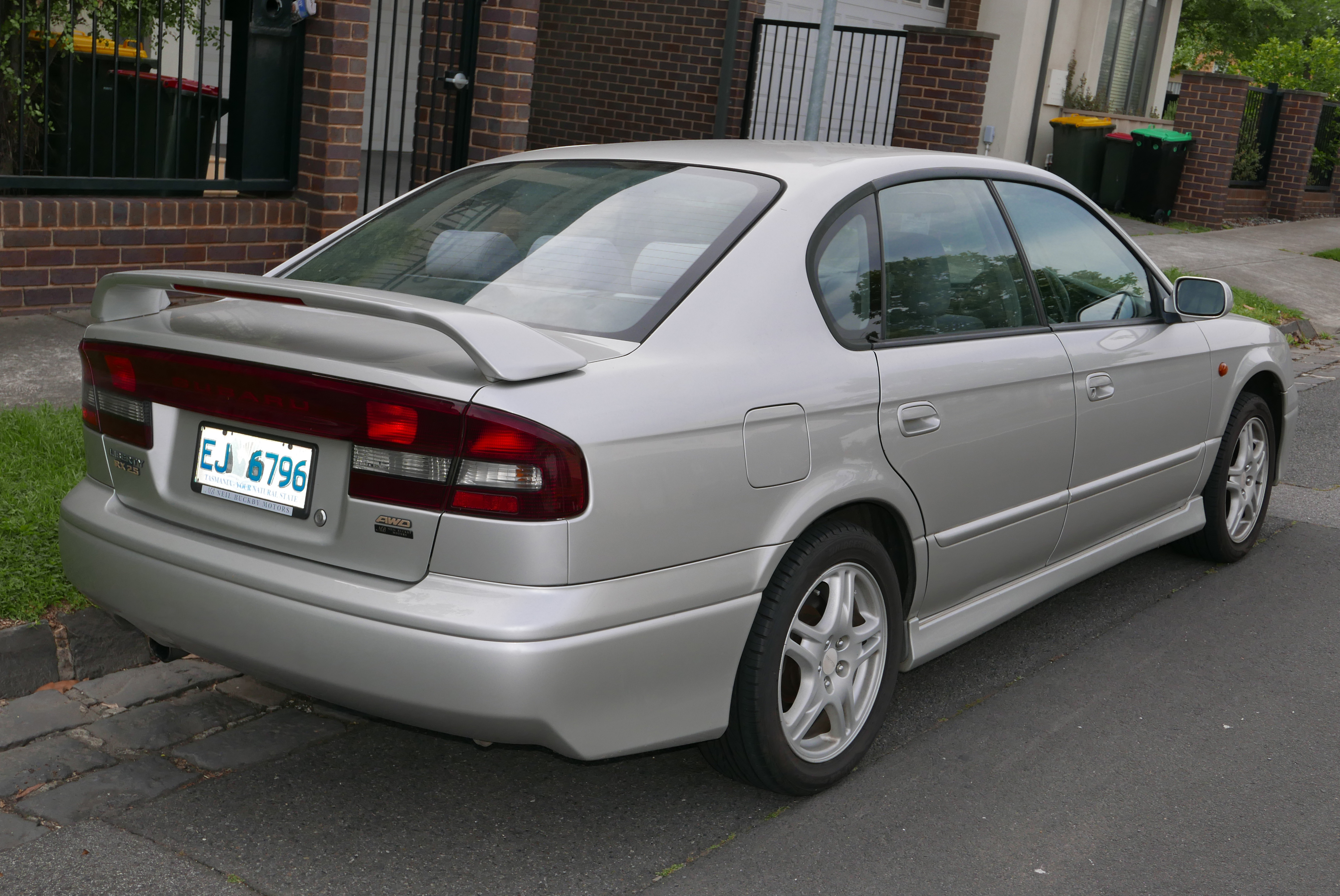
Subaru Liberty sedan (BE)

Subaru launched the third generation Japanese and world-market Legacy in June 1998, while the North American model started production in May 1999 as a 2000 model, also known as the BE for sedan models and BH for wagons. European-market and Japanese models ranged from a normally aspirated 2.0 L flat-4 to the EZ30 flat-6 in the 3.0R model (European and Japanese trim level designation), with the twin turbo that was offered in the previous generation still offered on performance models. In the US market the third generation Legacy went on sale with the 2.5 L EJ251 Engine standard. In 2001 the EZ30, a newly designed 3.0 L H6 was offered in the Outbacks. The engine now met California's LEV emission standard.

Flat roof wagons were no longer manufactured worldwide, and instead the raised roof is used for both the Legacy wagon and Legacy Outback. Daytime running lamps were introduced on US models starting with the 2000 model year. Cabin air filters were available starting with 2001 models installed underneath and behind the glove compartment door.

Japanese-spec vehicles with the twin turbo had a choice of manual or semi-automatic transmission called SportShift, that allowed the driver to push the automatic gearshift selector to the left, and then allow the driver to shift the automatic like a manual transmission.

U.S. models ended in 2004.

== Fourth generation (BL/BP; 2003) ==
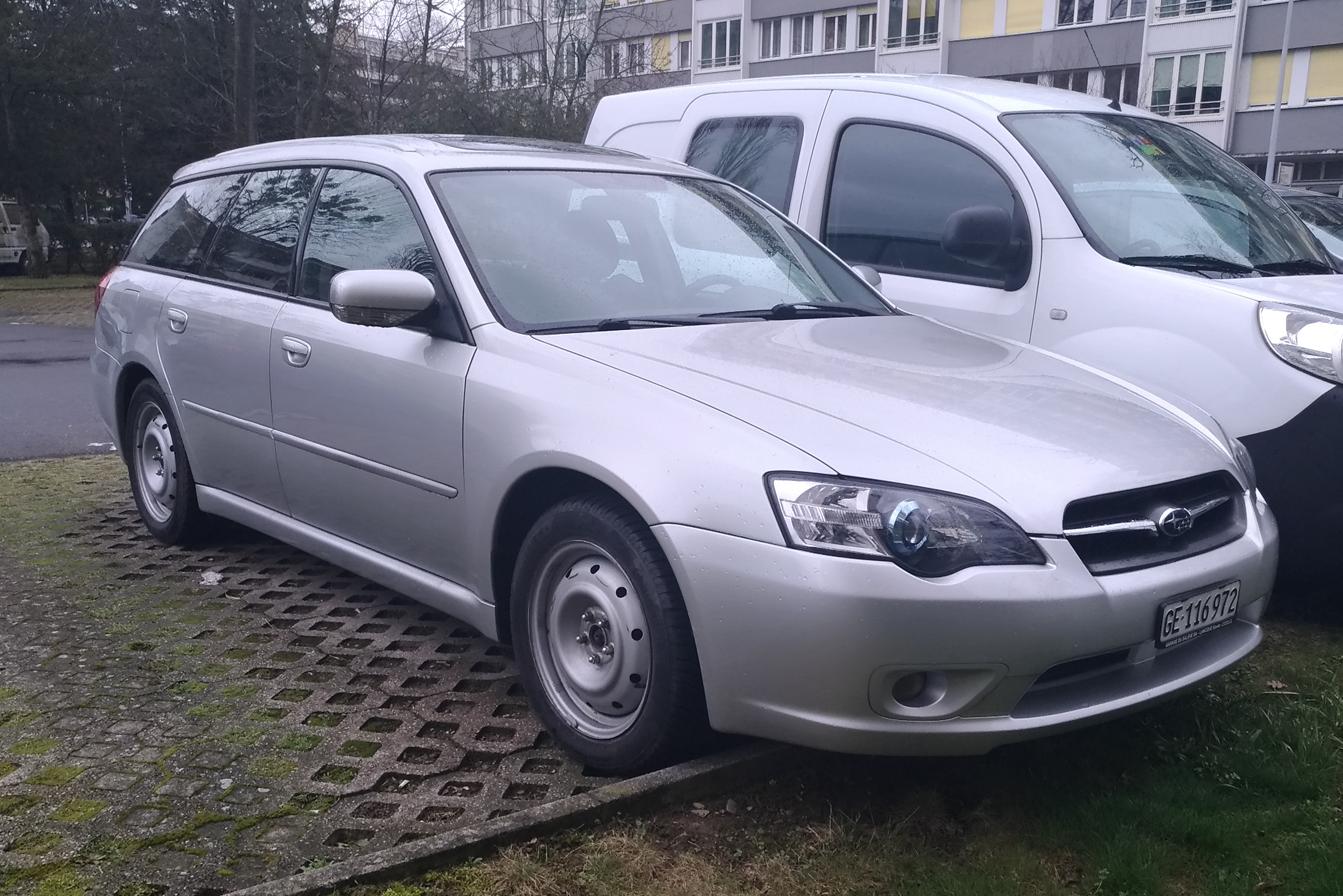

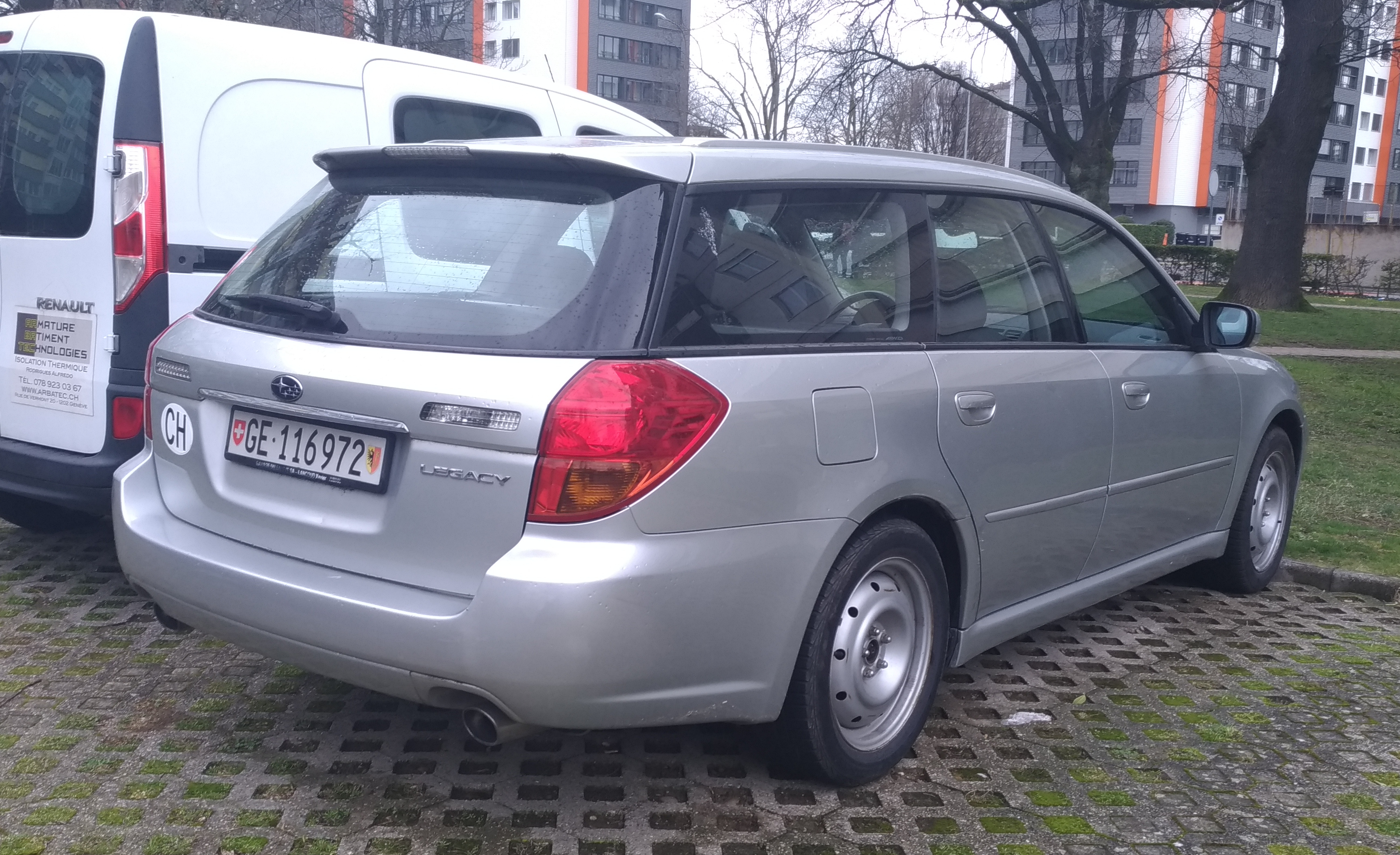
Subaru Legacy Estate (BP; pre-facelift)

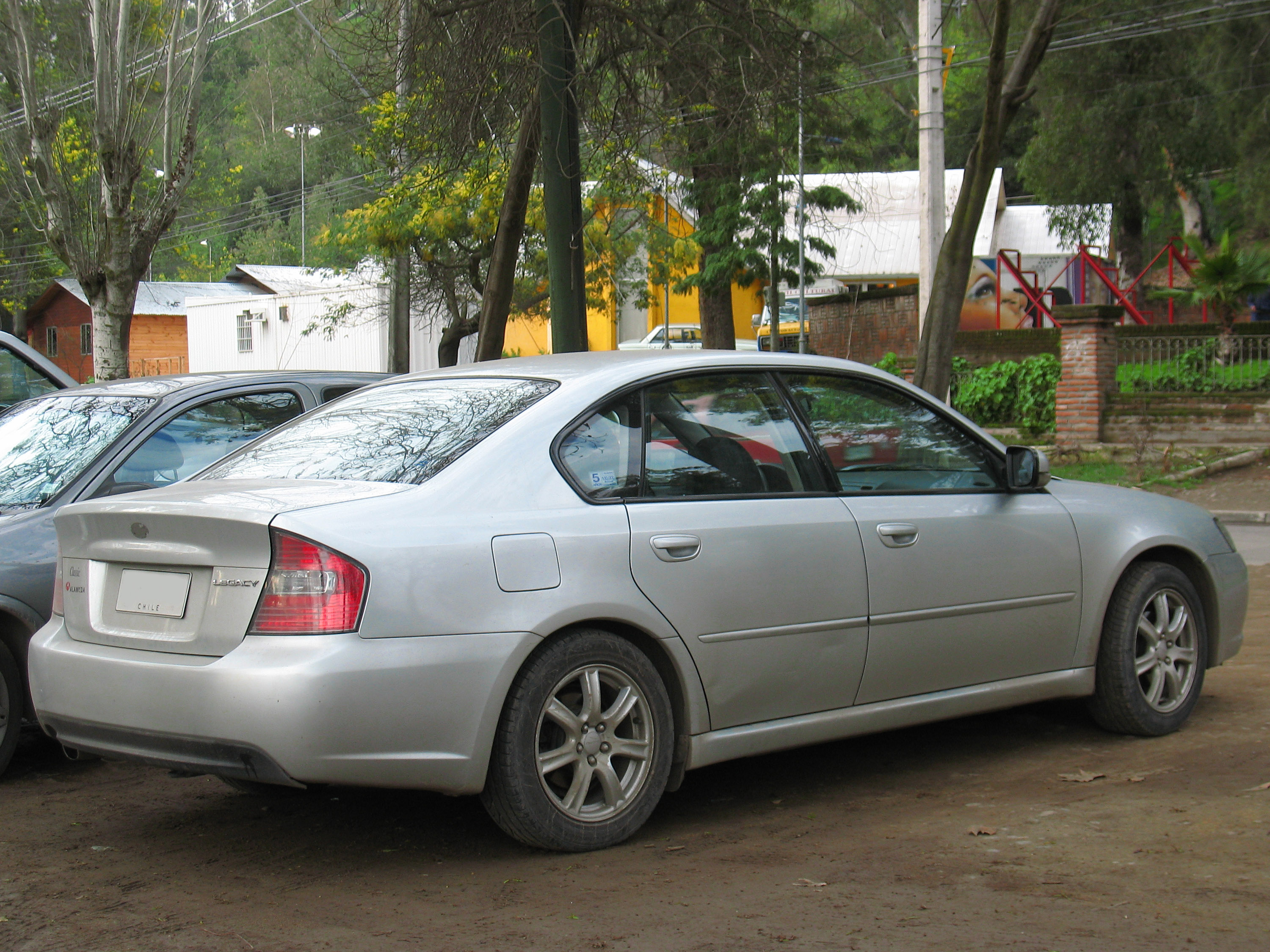
Subaru Legacy sedan (BL; pre-facelift)

On May 23, 2003, Fuji Heavy Industries debuted the redesigned Legacy, known as the BL for sedan models and BP for wagons. It was released worldwide in 2004, with Subaru Indiana Automotive commencing production in February 2004 for the North American markets for 2005 model year. The Legacy was presented the 2003–2004 Japan Car of the Year, Subaru's first win for the award after fighting off stiff competition from Toyota Prius and Mazda RX-8. When sales began in the US market, the Lafayette Factory built Legacy won 2005 International Car of the Year for Most Dependable/Sedan from Road & Travel Magazine, 2005 Automobile All-Stars for All-Star Family Car from Automobile Magazine and The 2006 International Engine of the Year Award in the 2.0-litre to 2.5-litre category for EJ255 engine. Lance Armstrong was used as a spokesman for both the sedan and wagon, and Sheryl Crow sang her 1996 hit "Everyday Is a Winding Road" in US market commercials. The chassis was redesigned and made stiffer, and it marked the return of a turbocharged engine to North American Legacy, featuring a 2.5-litre unit derived from that of the North American Impreza WRX STI. Due to advancements in turbocharger technology and tightening emission standards, the twin-turbo setup was dropped from the lineup. Turbocharged models and the H6 offered Subaru's first 5-speed automatic transmission, featuring SportShift technology licensed from Prodrive, Ltd.

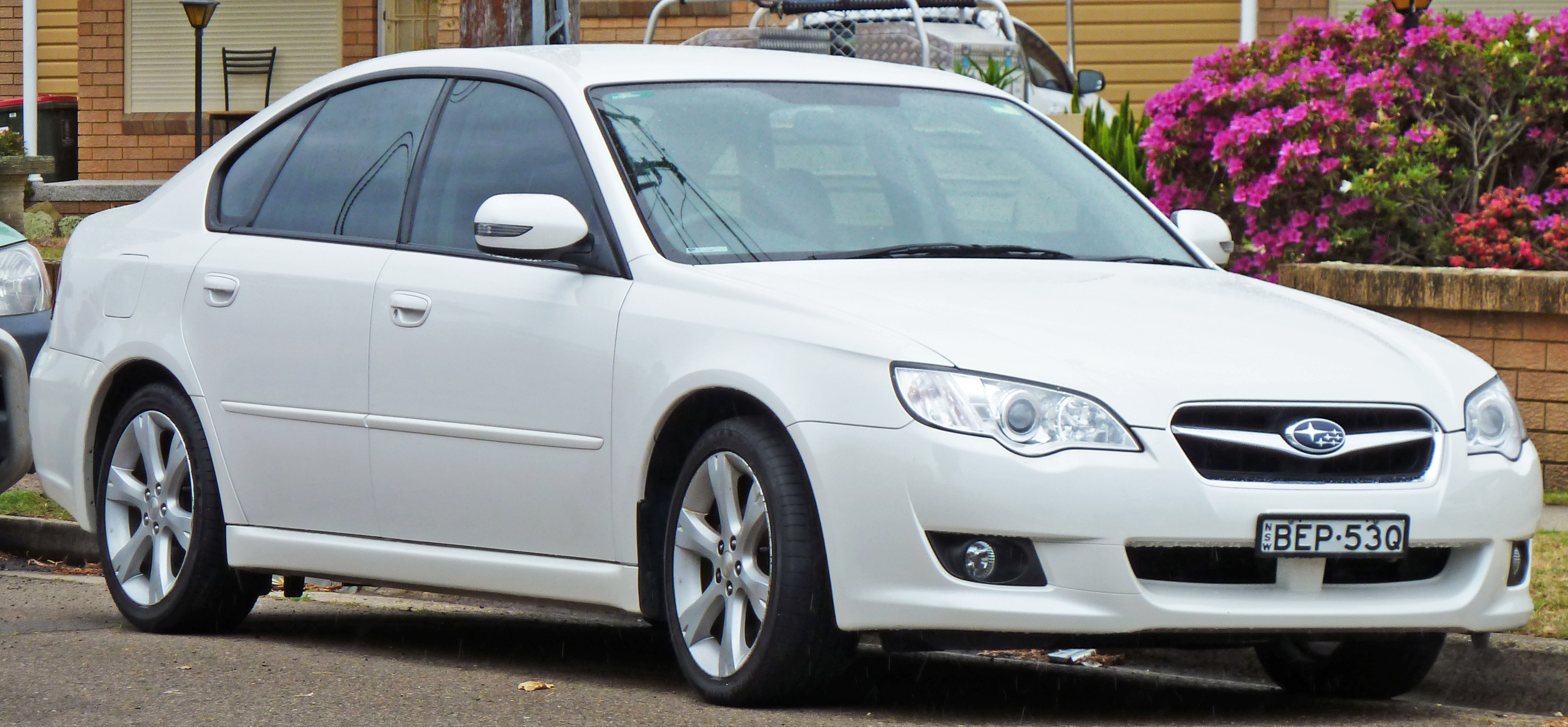

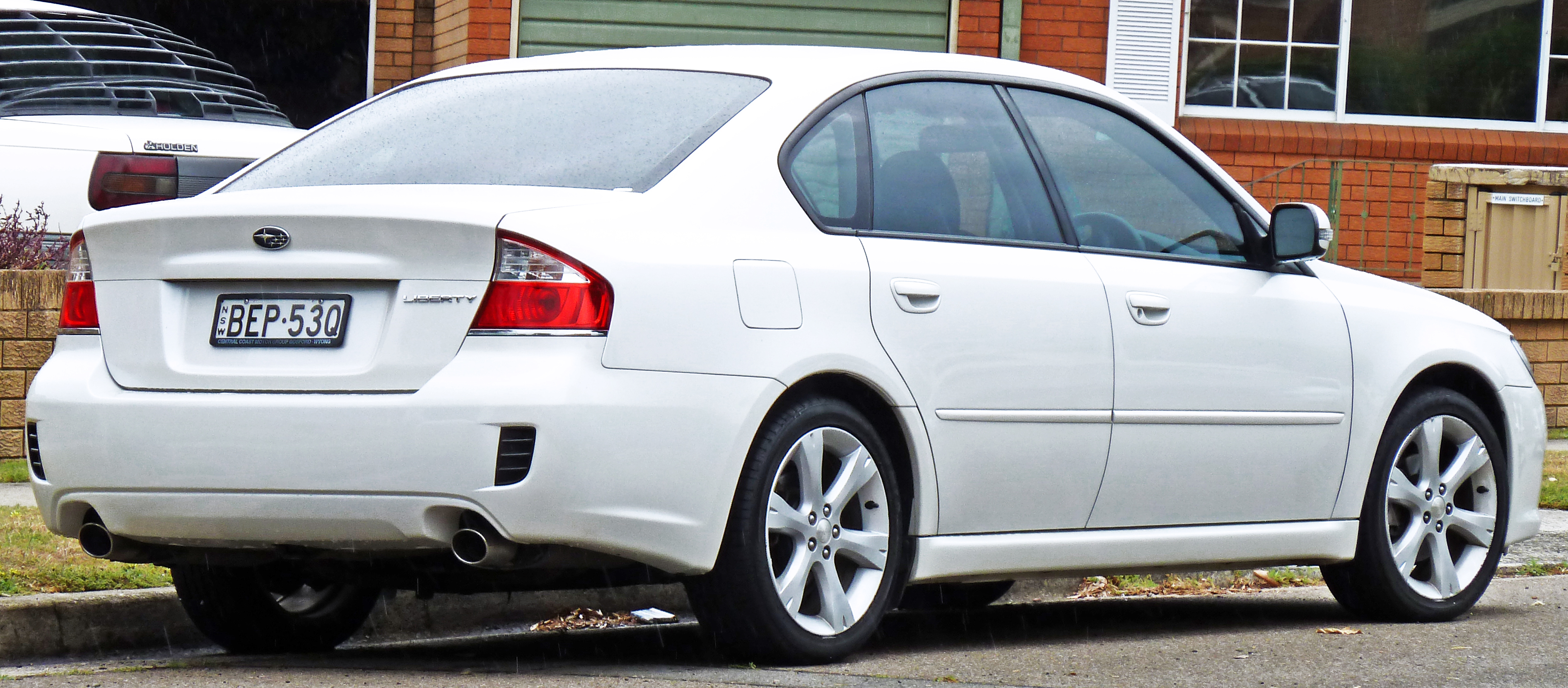
Subaru Liberty sedan (BL; facelift)

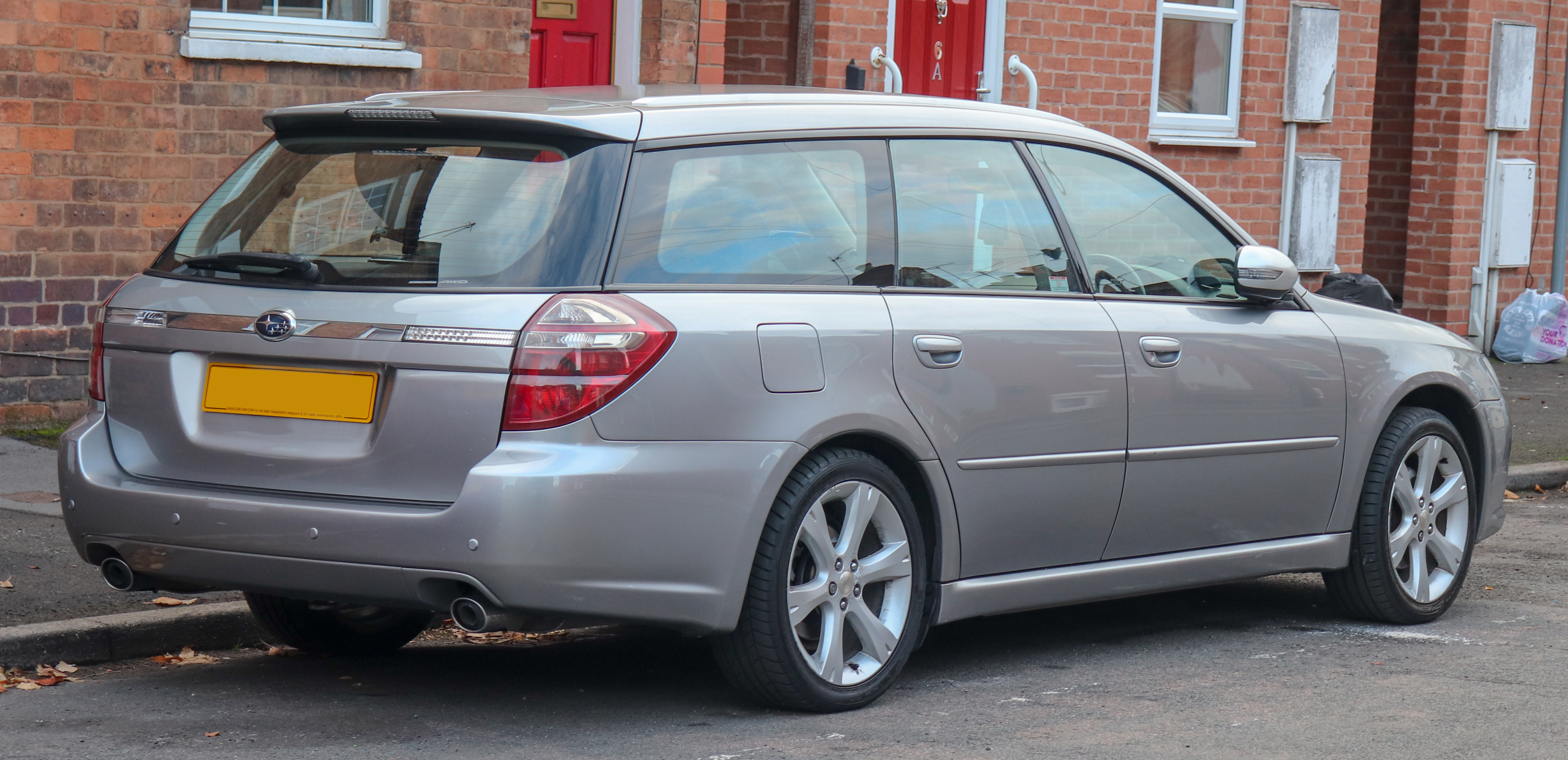
Subaru Legacy Sports Tourer (BP; facelift)

The 2005 model year Legacy for the US market was offered in 2.5i, 2.5i Limited, 2.5GT, and 2.5GT Limited. All trim levels were available as Sedan and Wagon. For 2006, the regular GT was dropped, and the 2.5i Special Edition was added into the line up.

The Japanese market Legacy GT featured 2 litre turbocharged EJ20X and EJ20Y engines developing power and torque figures of 276 bhp (280 PS/206 kW) at 6400 rpm and 343 N·m (253 lb·ft/35 kgm) at 2400 rpm respectively. The GT Spec B had an optional 6 speed transmission. Both models featured Bilstein suspension as standard. Both wagon and sedan received a facelift in 2006 receiving new bumpers and trim, the IHI VF38 twin scroll turbo was replaced with later models receiving a VF44 (auto) or VF45 (manual) turbo.

On May 10, 2008, the Japanese-spec Legacy can be fitted with a new collision avoidance feature, called EyeSight. It consists of twin CCD cameras, one on each side of the rear view mirror, that use human-like stereoscopic vision to judge distances and generally keep tabs on the driver. The system can help maintain a safe distance on the highway, a lane departure warning system, a driver alert warning for various safety situations, and even keeps an eye out for pedestrians. SI-Cruise has been integrated into the EyeSight feature as a driver safety aid.

The Subaru EE flat-4 diesel engine, the world's first to be fitted to a passenger car, is offered in both the Legacy and Outback sedans and wagons, identified as the Subaru Legacy 2.0D. The vehicle was released in the European Union starting March 2008, and is offered with a 5-speed manual transmission only. The official introduction of the Legacy and Outback diesel was at the Geneva Motor Show in March 2008.

== Fifth generation (BM/BR; 2009) ==
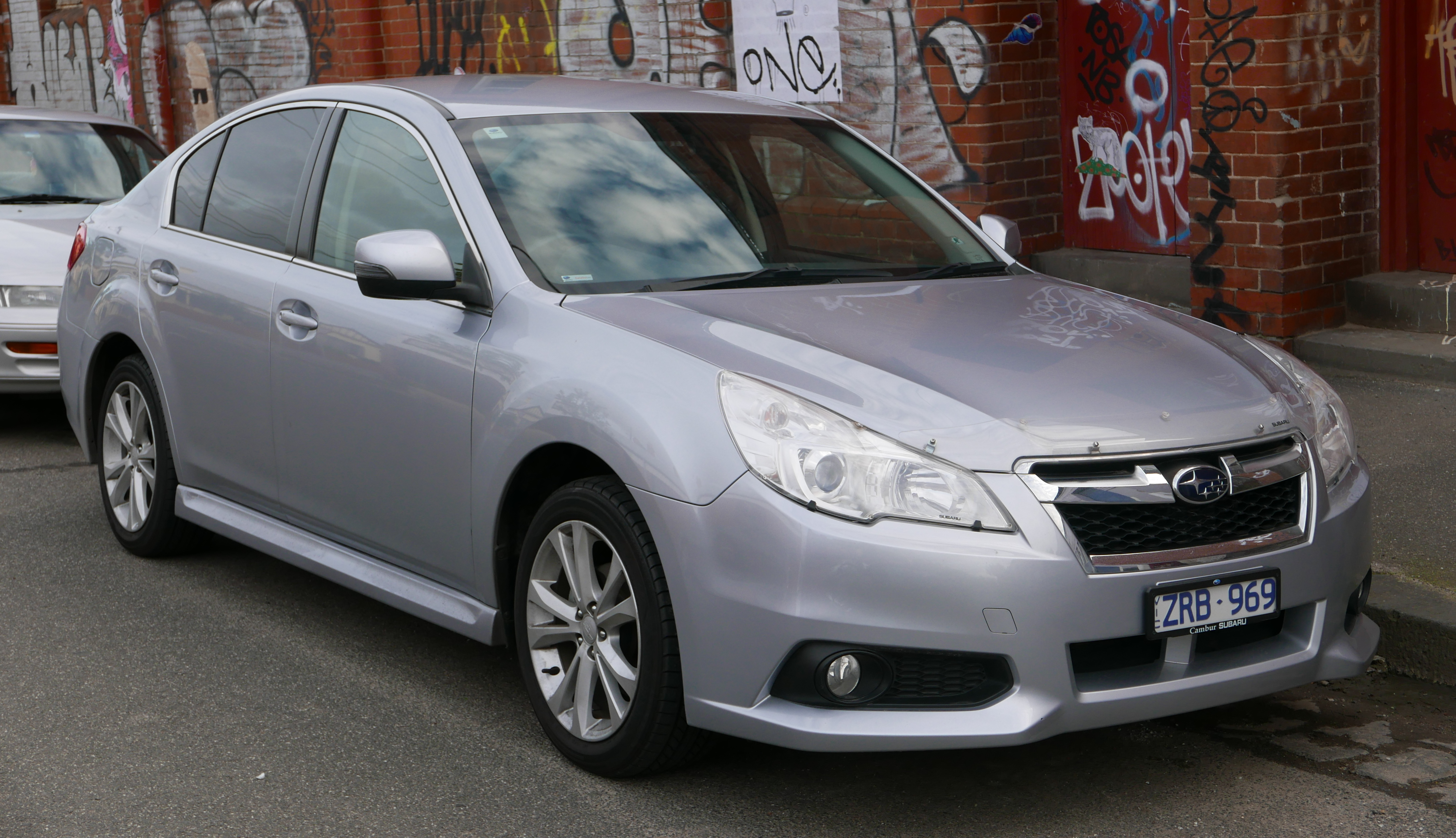

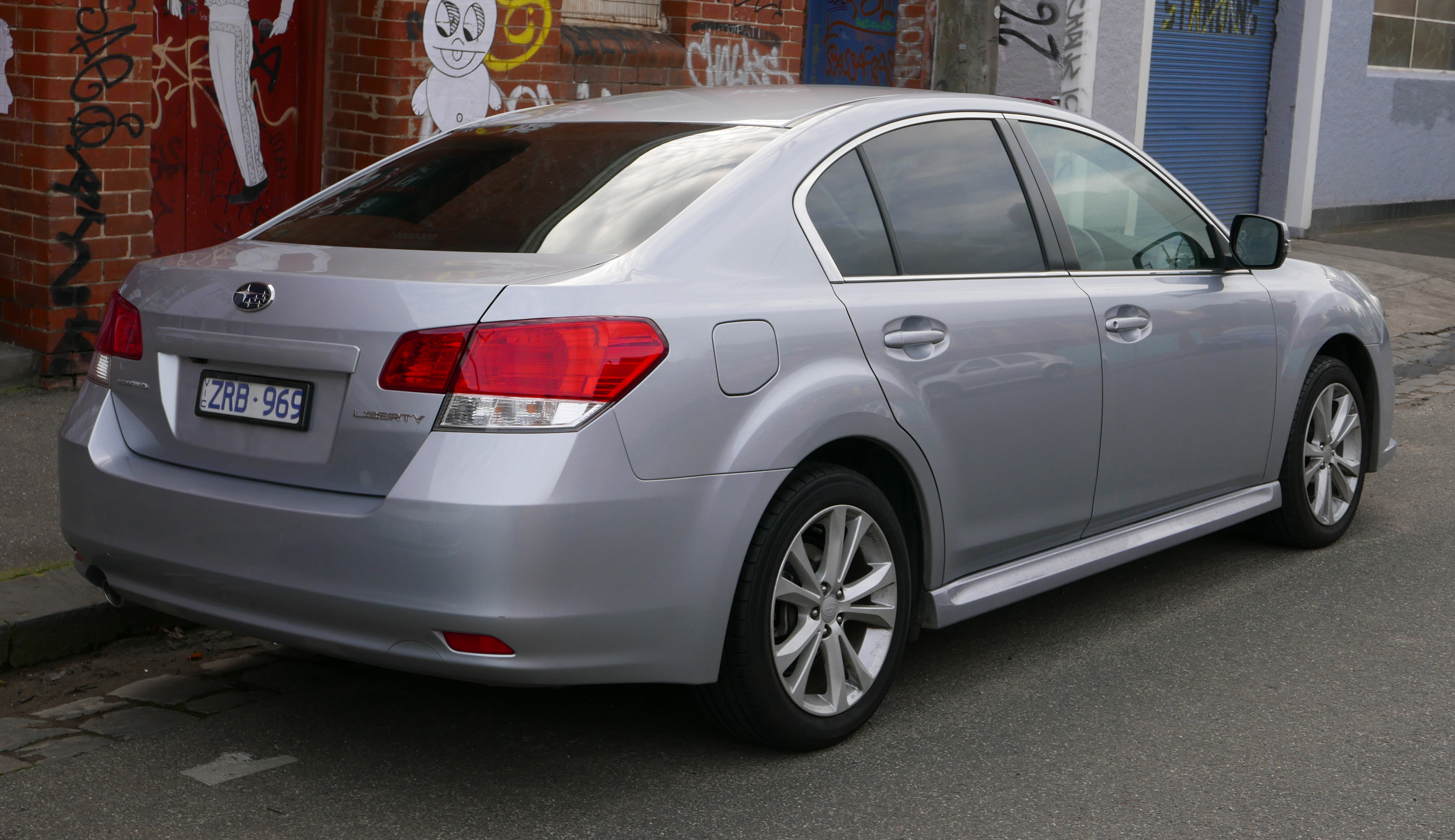
Subaru Liberty sedan (BM)

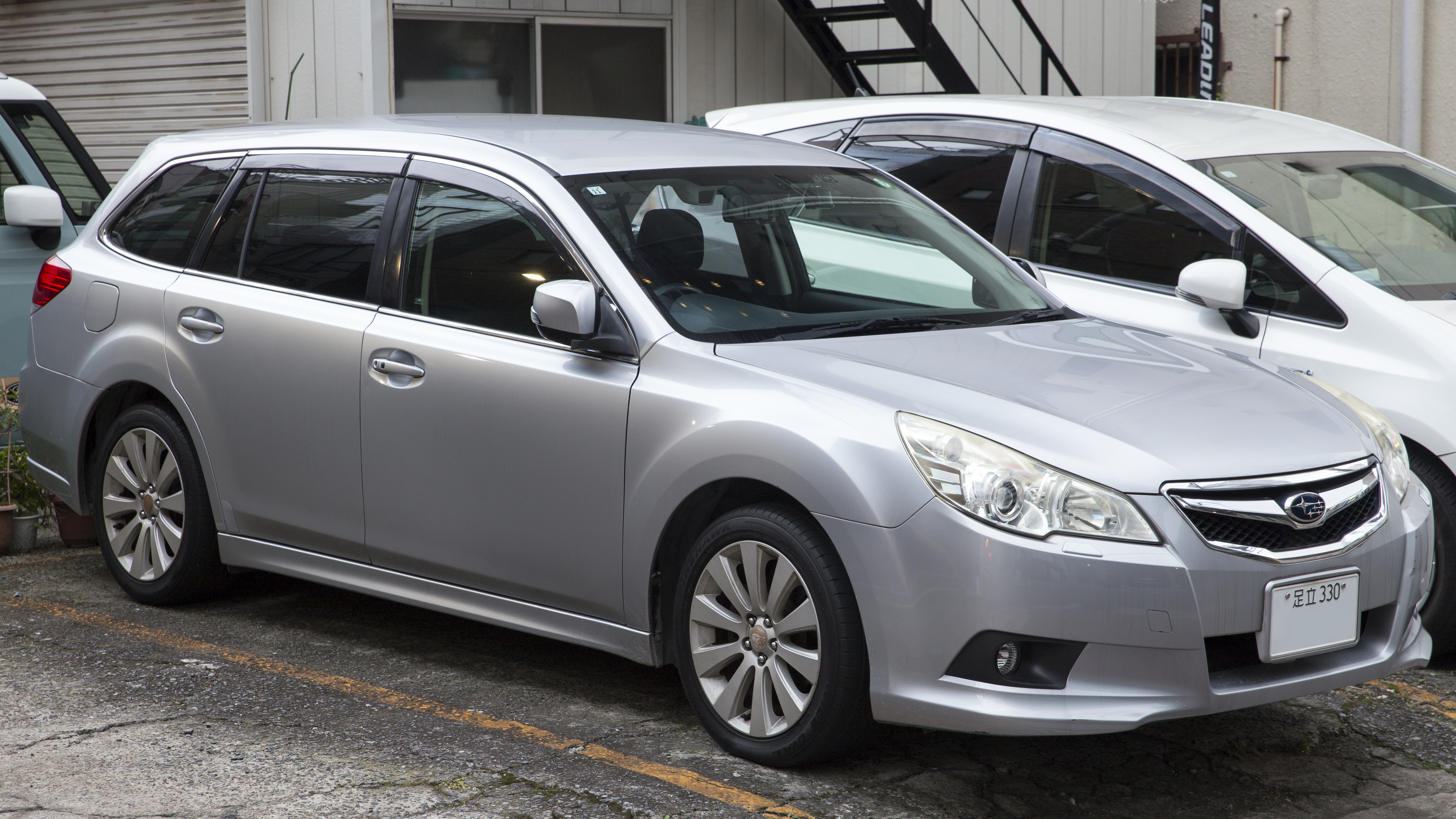

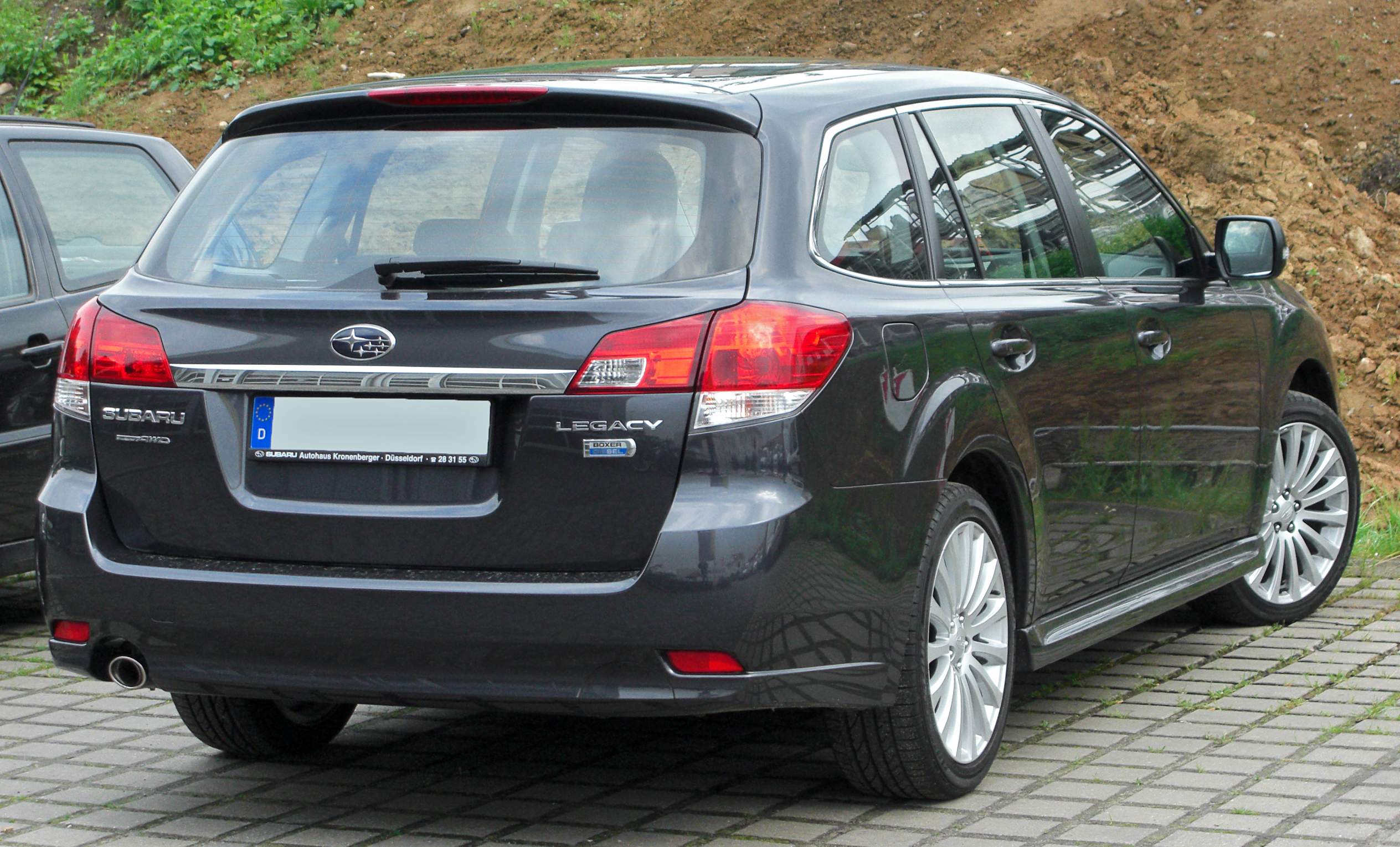
Subaru Legacy station wagon (BR)

In 2009, a Subaru Legacy/Liberty concept was designed to commemorate 20th anniversary of the model, reported to be the basis of the production version of the then upcoming fifth generation Subaru Legacy/Liberty. The concept vehicle was unveiled at the 2009 Detroit Auto Show.

Production of the fifth generation 2010 Subaru Legacy/Liberty began the last week of May 2009 at the Indiana location, and was unveiled at the 2009 New York Auto Show. According to the Subaru website in Japan, the Legacy was introduced in Japan on May 20, 2009. The Legacy B4 2.5GT tS tuned by STi was introduced to Japan June 12, 2010.

In May 2010, the EyeSight collision avoidance feature introduced on the previous generation Legacy/Liberty was re-introduced on the Japan-spec Touring Wagon and Outback, and was awarded the "Best Technology" award from the Japan Automotive Hall of Fame at the Japan Museum of Nature and Science. For the 2014 model year, the EyeSight driver safety aid has been installed optionally on all international Legacy/Liberty and Outback vehicles.

The new for this generation Lineartronic continuously variable transmission is used internationally on the EJ253 2.5 L flat-4 engine and the EJ20 in some markets, with a 6-speed manual transmission also offered only in North America and Australia. The 2.5GT uses a turbocharger with a 6-speed manual transmission used exclusively in Japan and North America with Australia being able to choose between the 6-speed manual or 5-speed SportShift conventional automatic transmission; vehicles identified as "3.6R" use the EZ36 flat-6 engine with a 5-speed SportShift conventional automatic transmission. The Lineartronic CVT transmission is also shared with the JDM-spec Subaru Exiga on AWD models. The North American PZEV Legacy 2.5i continues to be available in all 50 states, unlike other manufacturers who only sell PZEV certified vehicles in states that have adopted California emission standards.

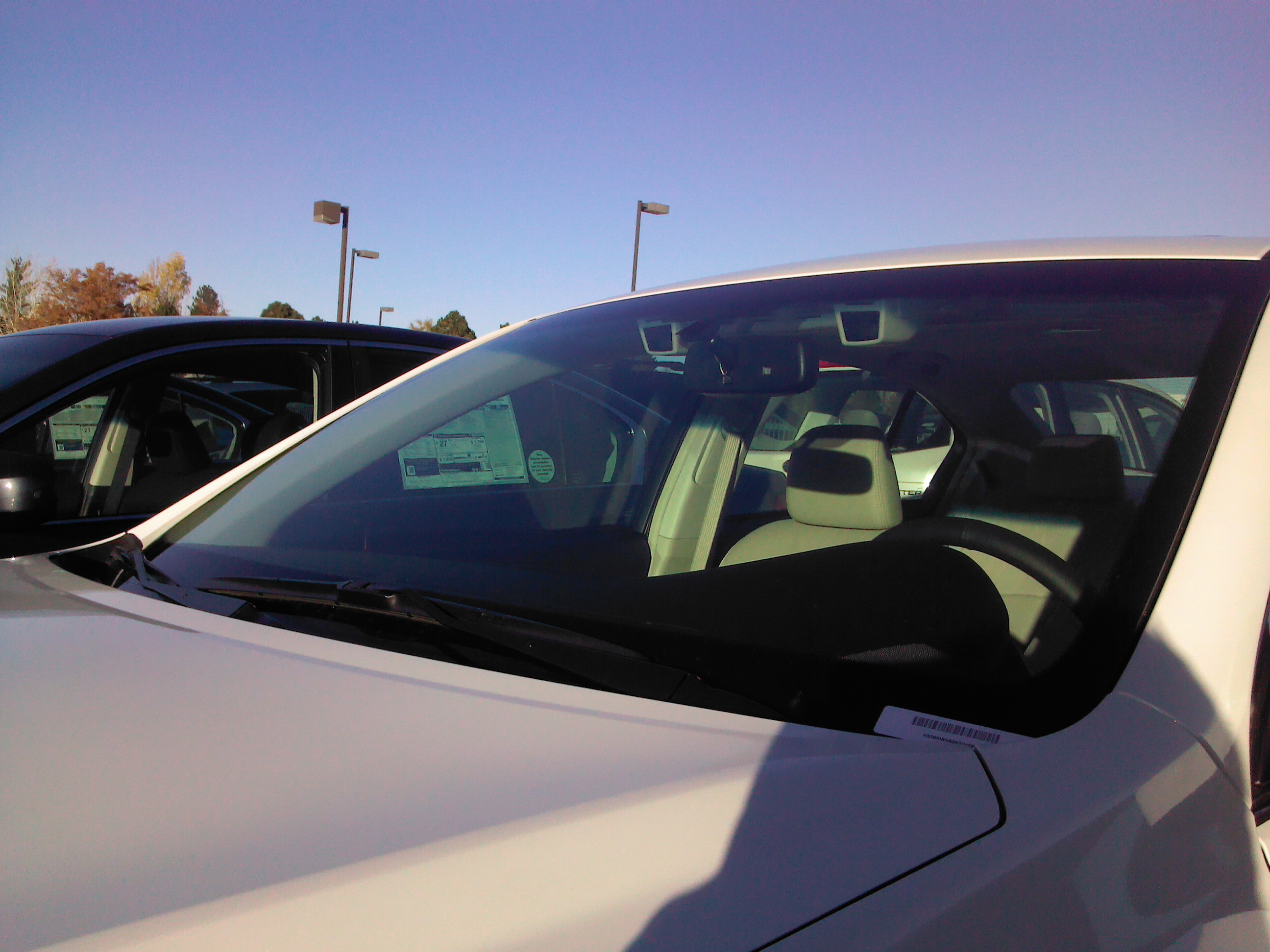
2014 Subaru Legacy 3.6R Limited with EyeSight technology cameras next to rear view mirror (US)

Internationally, the EZ36 flat-6 engine is used in the Outback only, but is also available in the Legacy/Liberty sedan in both North America and Australia. The Japan-spec vehicle has discontinued using the EJ25 engine which increases vehicle tax liability for Japanese buyers, offering the EJ20 in both turbo and non-turbo versions. "SI-Drive" is standard equipment on all Japanese-spec vehicles, and both the Australian GT Premium and the 3.6R sedan, but not in North America. SI-Drive is standard on the international Outback with the EZ36 except North America. The Legacy wagon is only available as an Outback in North America, whereas both a Legacy and Outback wagon are available in Japan, the UK, Australia, and Europe. In the UK, only the wagon is offered, with engine choices limited to the Subaru EE20 turbodiesel or the EJ25. The EZ36 engine was available in the UK in 2010 MY Outbacks only. In Europe and certain Asian countries, the EJ20 is still offered in both the sedan and a wagon, alongside the EE20 turbodiesel and the EJ25. The EE20 turbodiesel is available in Australia in the Outback. The European and UK Legacy EE20 diesel, the EJ20 and the EJ25 gasoline engines are Euro5 emission standard compliant.

This is the ninth Subaru vehicle to offer a CVT transmission; the first was the Subaru Justy (1987–1994), followed by the Subaru Rex (1987–1992), the Subaru Vivio (1992–1998), the Subaru Pleo (1998–current), the Subaru R1 coupe (2004–2010), the Subaru R2 5-door hatchback (2003–2010), the Subaru Sambar (1990–1995 only), and the Subaru Exiga starting September 2009.

== Sixth generation (BN/BS; 2014) ==
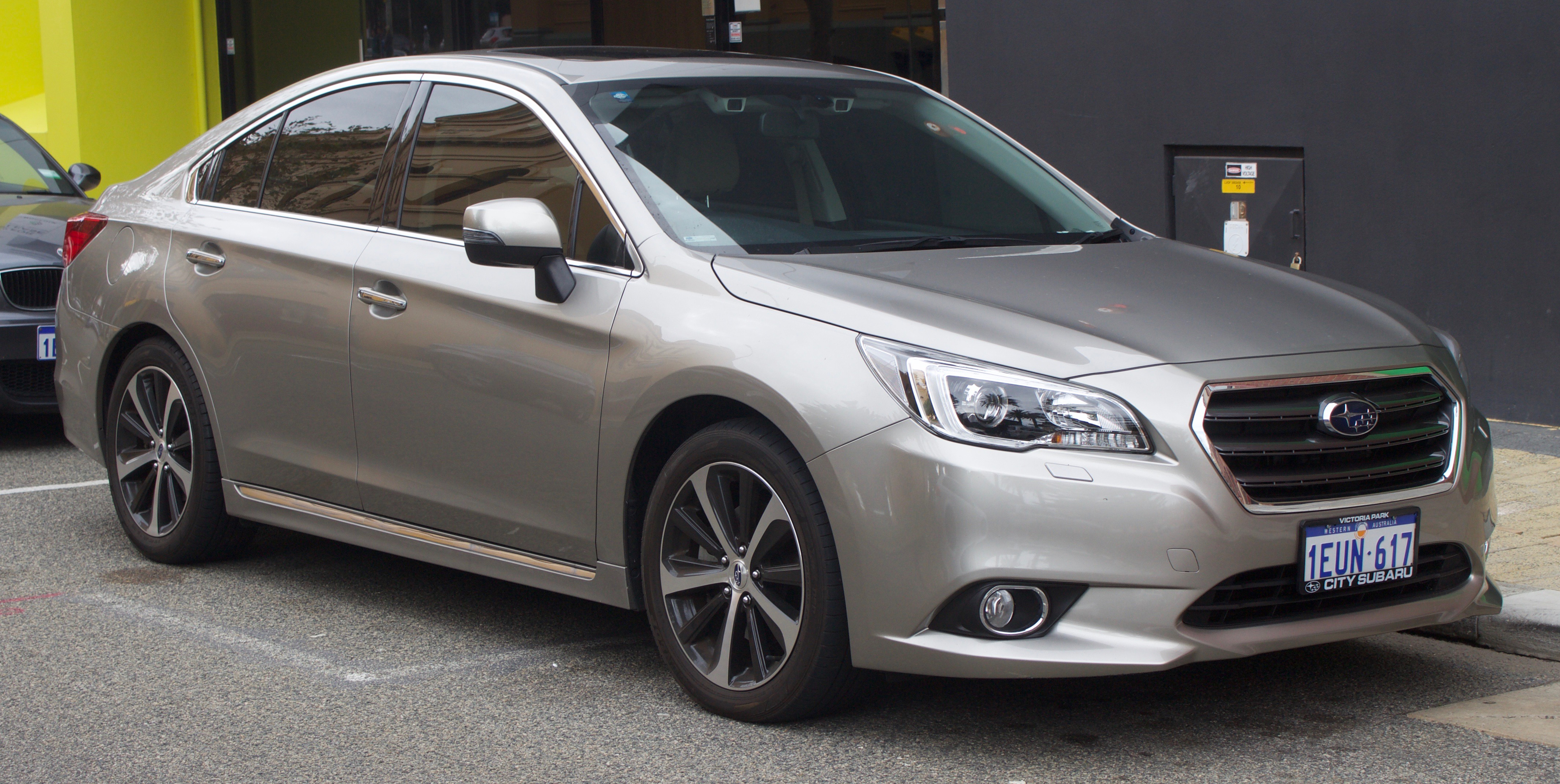

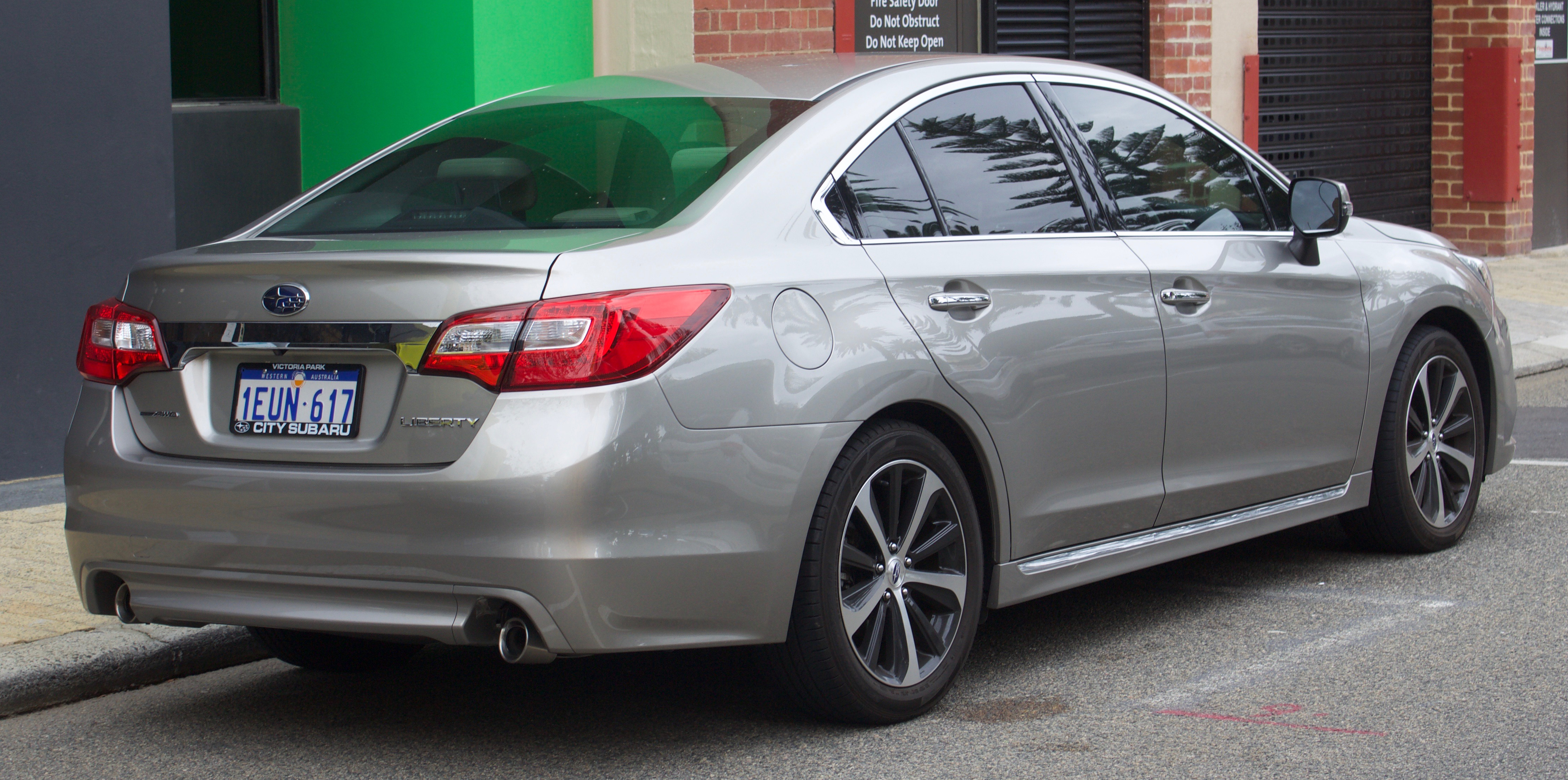
Subaru Liberty 3.6R sedan (BN)

The sixth generation of the Subaru Legacy made its debut at the 2014 Chicago Auto Show, and went into production for the 2015 model year.

=== Engines and drivetrain ===
A 2.5-litre flat-four FB25 and a 3.6-litre flat-six EZ36D are carried over from the fifth-generation model. Output is slightly increased on the four-cylinder model to 175 PS (129 kW; 173 bhp). The six-cylinder model remains unchanged from the 260 PS ( 191 kW ; 256bhp). 3.6-litre engine.

The Legacy still uniquely offers standard all-wheel drive and horizontally opposed engine layouts, but discontinues the manual transmission for the US market in favor of the Lineartronic CVT on both engine configurations. The US market 2016 Legacy achieves a notable 36 highway MPG when equipped with the 2.5-litre flat-four.

== Seventh generation (BW/BT; 2019) ==
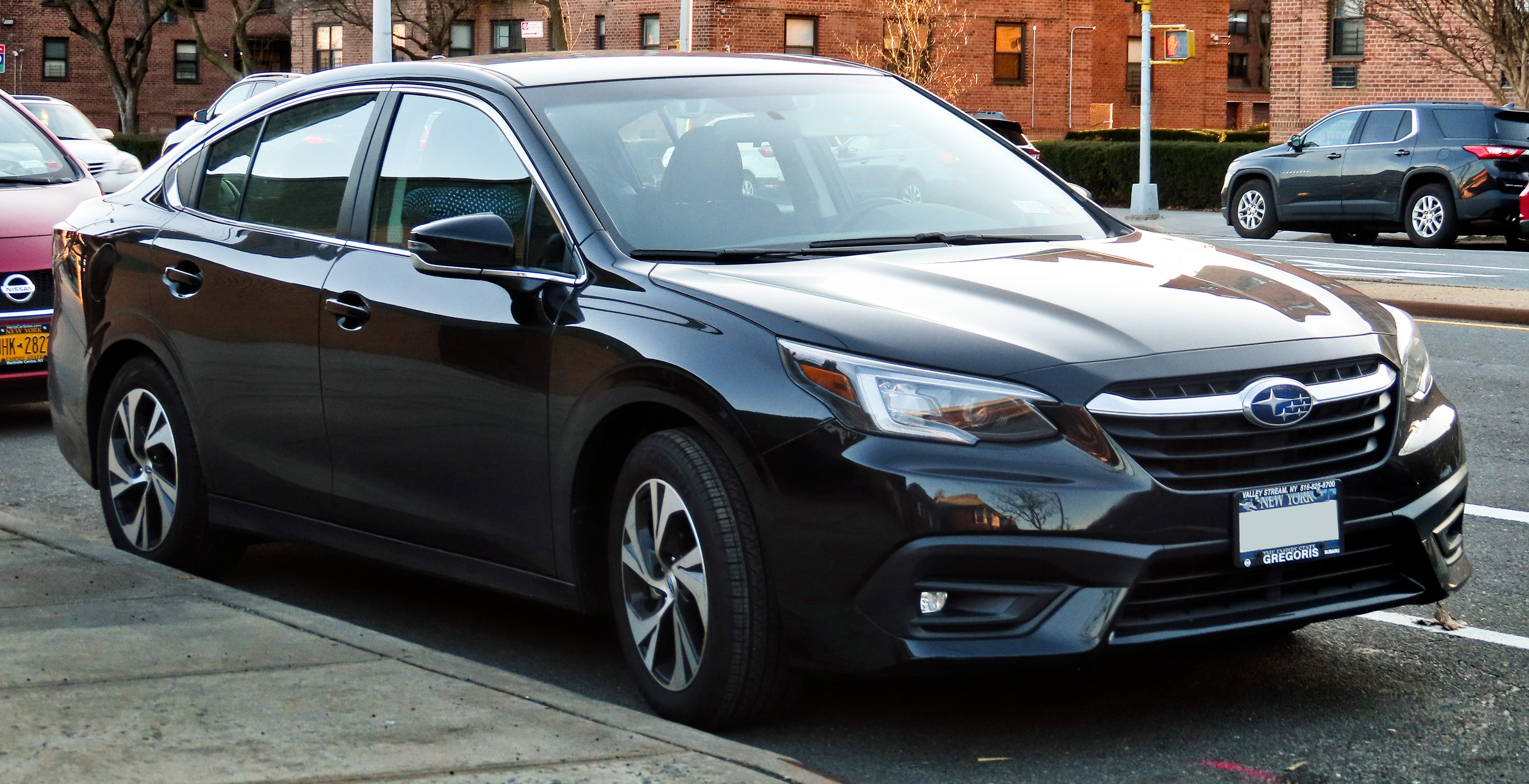

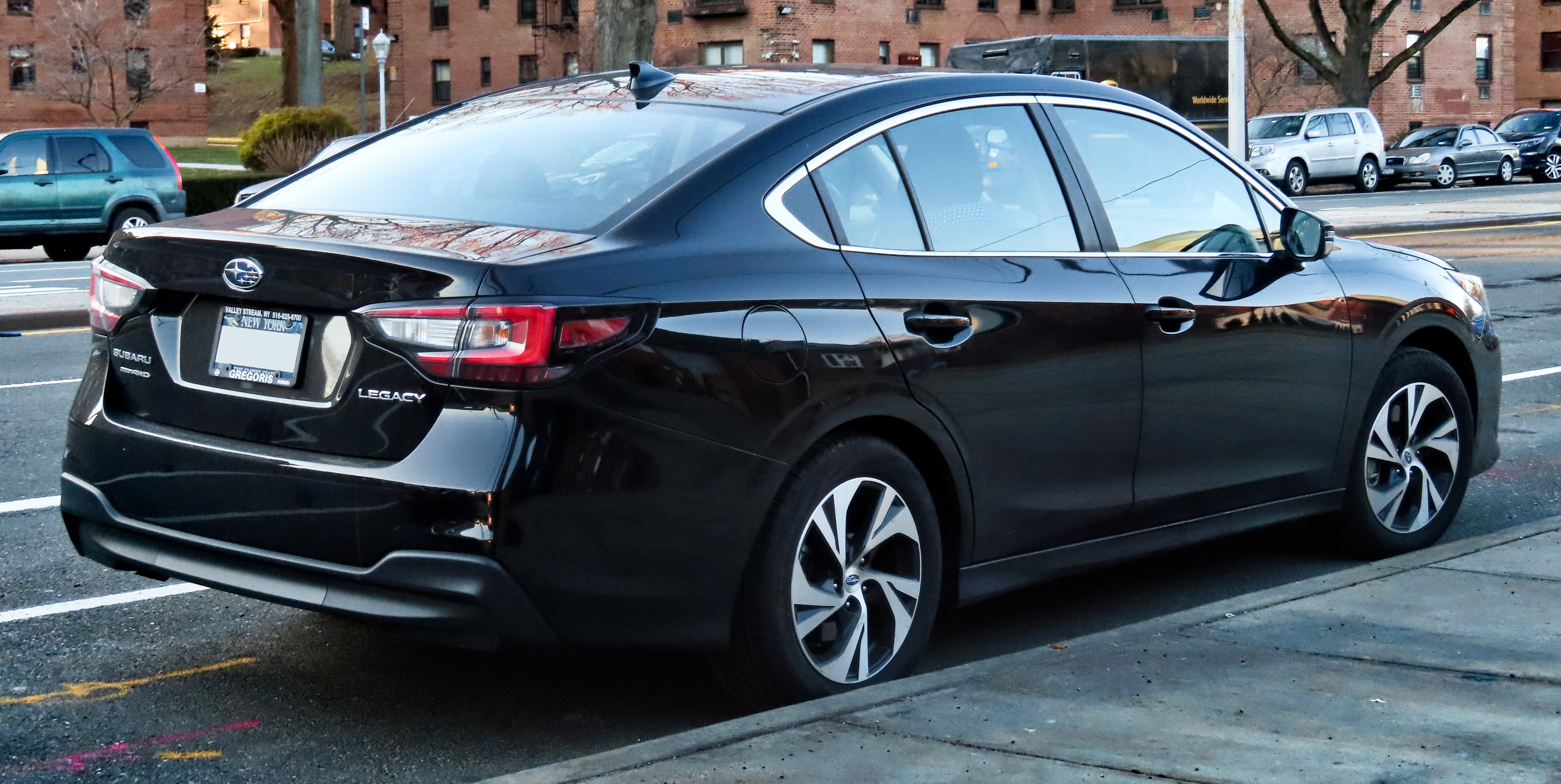
Subaru Legacy sedan (BW)

The seventh-generation Legacy made its debut at the 2019 Chicago Auto Show on February 7, 2019, to be sold at United States and Canadian dealerships starting in the third quarter of 2019 for the 2020 model year. Unlike the previous generations, the seventh generation Legacy will not be sold in Japan and Australia because of disappointing sales from its predecessor. The 2020 model year Legacy was moved to the Subaru Global Platform (SGP), which is torsionally stiffer compared to the previous generation Legacy. Its exterior styling is similar to the previous generation model, but the headlights and the taillights are slightly restyled. The newly redesigned interior now features an 11.6 inch touchscreen on all trims except the base model, which has two 7 inch displays.

Notable mechanical changes include an updated base engine, the FB25 now featuring direct injection, and a turbocharged 2.4 litre FA24 flat four engine from the Ascent for higher trim levels which replaces the outgoing 3.6 litre EZ36 flat six engine. 90% of the components in the new FB25 are new compared to its predecessor.

In the USA, there are 5 Legacy trims: Base, Premium, Limited, Sport, and Touring XT.

The Sport and Touring XT use the FA24F direct-injection turbocharged engine with 260 hp @ 5,600 rpm and 277 lb-ft @ 2,000 - 4,800 rpm. The Base, Premium and Limited use the FB25 2.5-litre DOHC engine with 182 HP @ 5,800 RPM and 176 lb-ft @ 4,400 RPM (starting with the 2024 year).

In terms of safety, there is a new optional facial recognition system which uses cameras to warn the driver if the system detects that they are distracted or fatigued.

The 2025 model introduced the DriverFocus® Distraction Mitigation, a camera‑based system that monitors driver attention and issues alerts for fatigue or distraction. It also recognizes up to five individual drivers' preferences (seat position, climate, mirrors).

== Accomplishments and motorsports ==
=== Awards ===
In 1990, the Legacy was declared the number-one-selling 4-wheel drive car in the US by R.L. Polk & Company, based on registration statistics for CYE 1989. According to AutoFacts Inc. AutoGuide, dated June 28, 1990, the Legacy was the least expensive Sedan or Wagon offering both 4-wheel drive and ABS. The Automotive Journalists Association of Canada (AJAC) voted the Legacy "1990's Best New Sedan". In 2007, the Legacy Outback was named Top Gear Car Of The Year along with the Ford Mondeo.

=== Performance enhancements ===
The EZ series of flat-6-cylinder engines, used in current Legacy products, replaced the EG series found in the Subaru SVX. Subaru has produced high-performance versions of the Legacy with a Bilstein suspension and tuned turbocharged engines equivalent to the homologated rally version WRX STI (generating 205 kW (275 hp) on manufacturer's figures for the 2.0 L equivalent engine with manual transmission). Recent 3.0 L engines move close to the 2.0 L turbo output and share the Bilstein suspension. 2.0 L-engined turbocharged models with the Bilstein suspension were named either the GT-B (for wagons), or Spec B, or B4-RSK (for sedans). The new 2003 model moved many models to simply B4 or even GT in some countries. In Australia, the GT Premium marks the top of the pile for the Legacy/Liberty range.

In North America, early sporty models were known simply as the Sport Sedan and Touring Wagon. Later models were given the GT and GT Limited nomenclature. The 2006 Legacy model brought forth a limited run of 500 Spec B models. Starting in 2007 the Spec B became a regular production model (albeit a somewhat limited run). All Spec B models feature an improved suspension system by Bilstein, navigation system (making the Spec. B the sole pre-2010 MT Legacy to get one), exclusive (to the Spec B) interior, 18" wheels, and additional aesthetic modifications. 2006 Spec B models have a 5-speed manual transmission while 2007-on models have a 6-speed manual transmission.

=== Racing ===
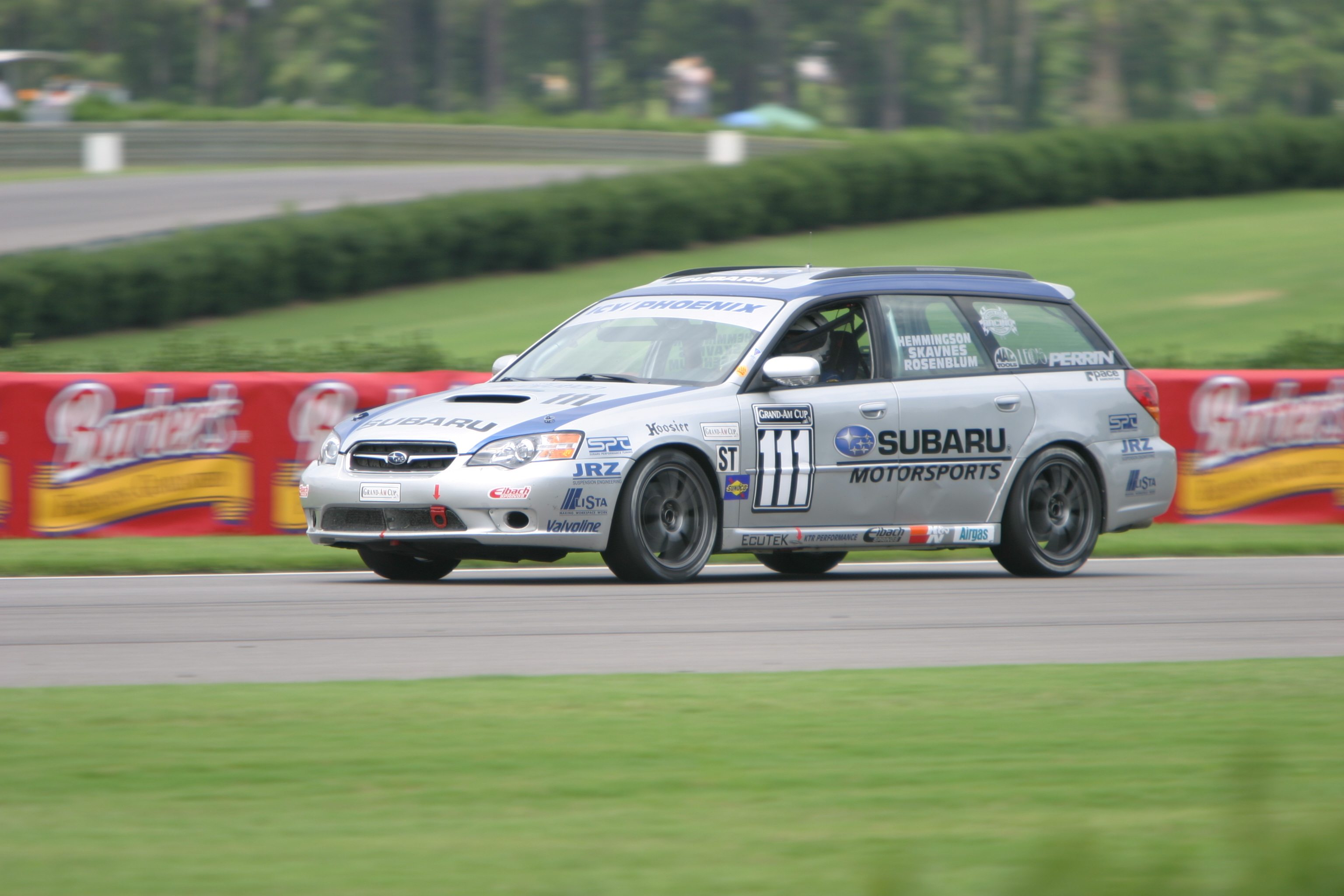
Subaru Legacy GT Wagon

==== Rallying ====
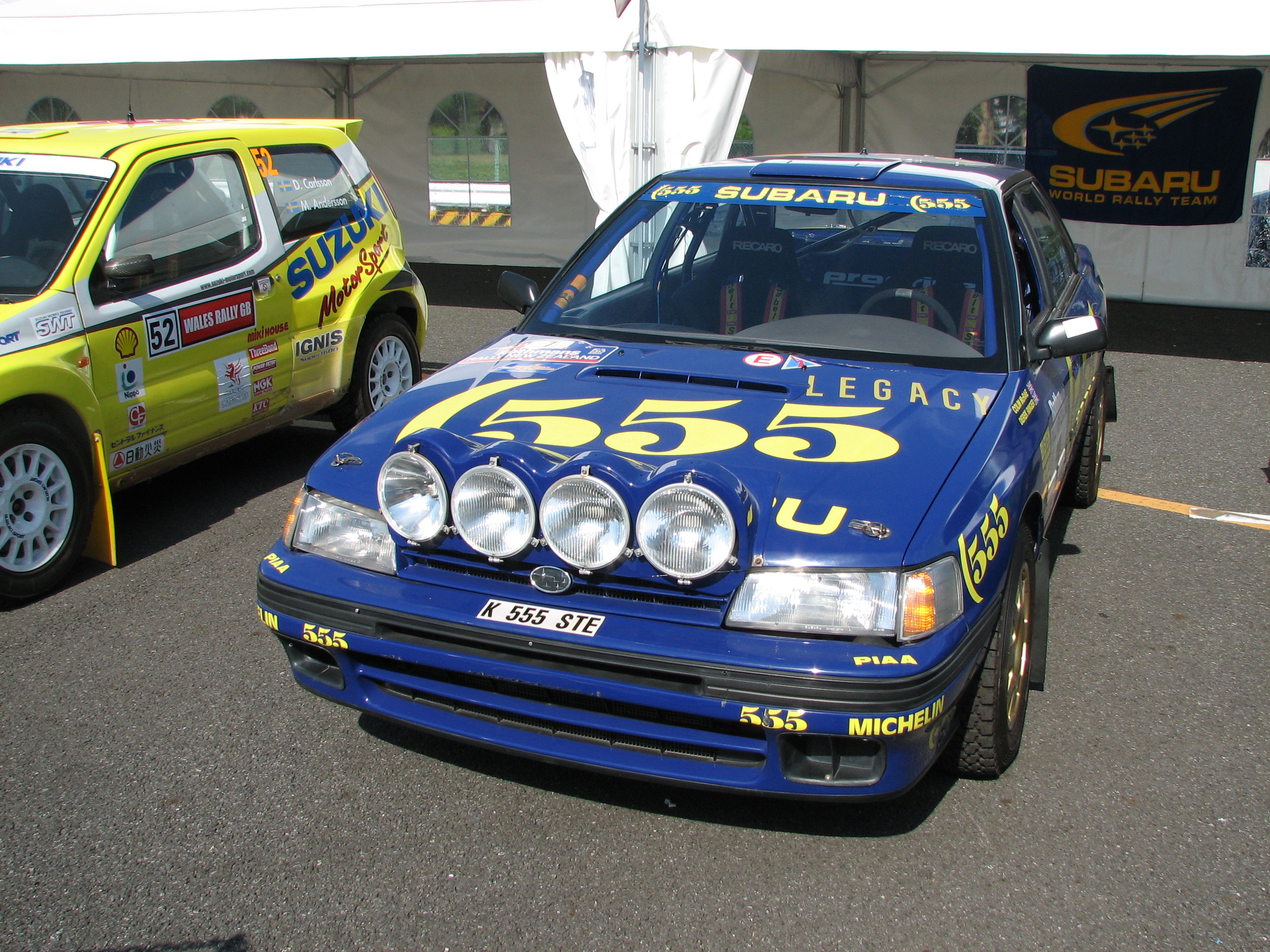
Subaru Legacy RS Turbo

The Legacy was campaigned by the Subaru World Rally Team in the World Rally Championship and British Rally Championship, with the help of Prodrive, beginning in 1990. It wasn't considered a truly competitive model at first, but showed promise under the command of Markku Alen, who in 1991 managed a third-place finish at the Swedish Rally. 1992 debuted the combination of experienced Group B, Pikes Peak International Hillclimb, and WRC driver Ari Vatanen, paired with the up-and-coming Scottish driver Colin McRae for Subaru's WRC effort. Two second-place finishes, one by each driver, strengthened the commitment of Subaru to the World Rally Championship, the Legacy, and their drivers. The Legacy's primary competitor, with a turbocharged engine and AWD, was the Mitsubishi Galant VR-4.

1993 became a breakout year for Subaru as Colin McRae and Ari Vatanen pushed the Legacy to a third-place finish at the Swedish Rally and a one-two placing after the first leg of the Acropolis Rally. Prodrive boss David Garraway was eager to prove the potential of the new Impreza WRC car, but was charged with gaining a victory in the Legacy before the Impreza could debut. At the round eight Rally New Zealand, Subaru finally struck gold when McRae managed to hold back François Delecour in his Ford Escort RS Cosworth for the win. This was the last WRC year for the Legacy, as the Impreza debuted at the following event, where it placed second in the hands of Vatanen.

Richard Burns was successful in numerous events with the car during 1992 before joining the World Rally team to drive the Impreza in 1993. Alister McRae, Per Eklund, Possum Bourne and Hannu Mikkola also competed in the Legacy during its WRC participation.

The Legacy has been frequently used in rallies such as SCCA ProRally and Rally America.

The Legacy, and its Outback stablemate, has won the Alcan Winter Rally several times; the first win was in 1990 followed by another win in 1992, 2002 and 2006.

A 1990 Legacy was the first Group N car to ever finish the WRC Safari Rally. This rally is considered the world's most gruelling rally under the World Rally Championship. In 1990 the 38th Safari Rally had 59 competitors total, only 10 of which were able to reach the finish. The Legacy was the only Group N car able to reach the finish and was in 8th place overall.

==== Super GT ====
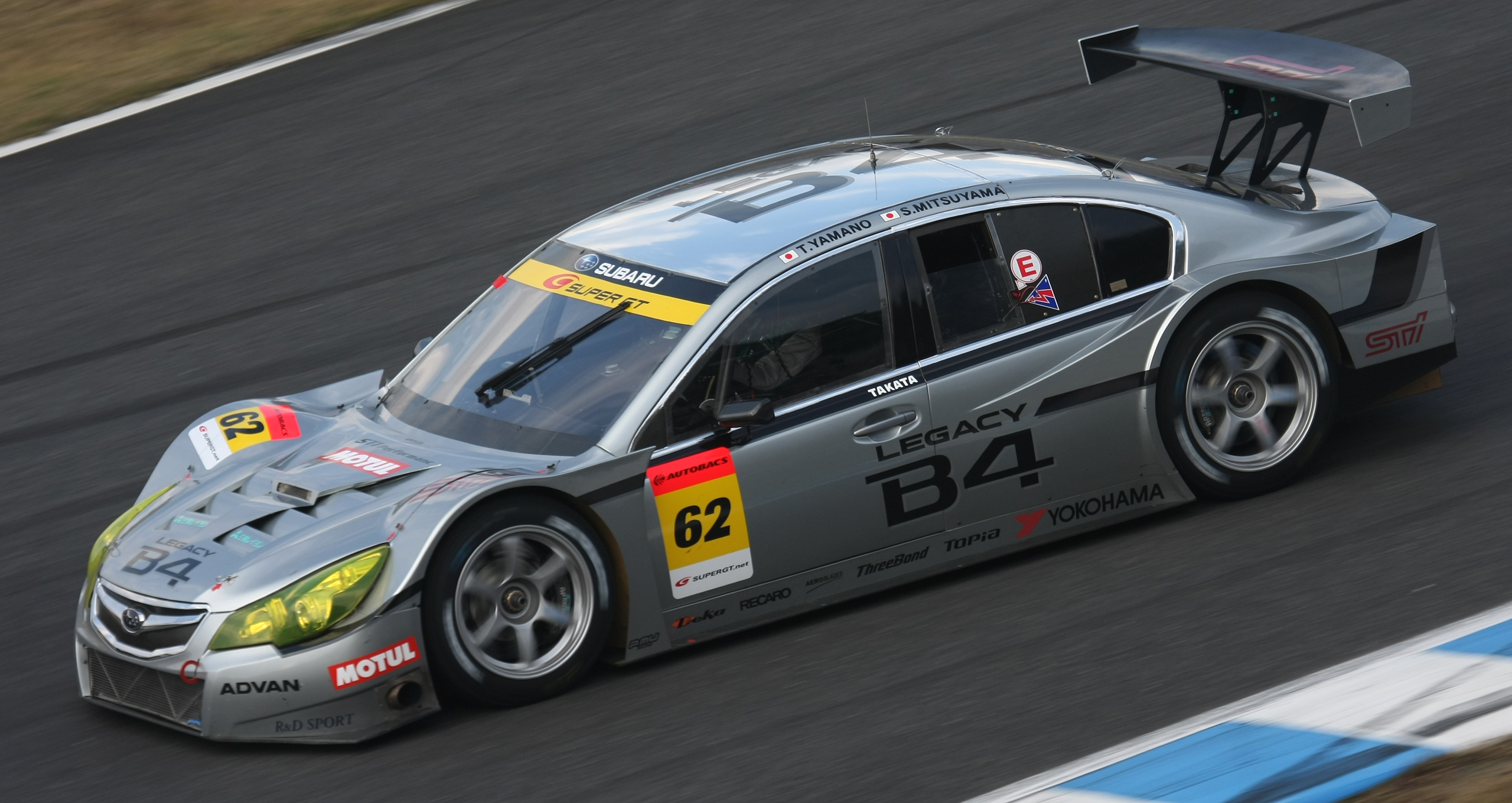
The R&D Sport Legacy B4 in the 2009 Super GT season.

Similar to the Impreza that Team Cusco ran in previous years until 2008, a Legacy grand tourer car based on the fifth generation model has been built by R&D Sport for the Japanese Super GT series (GT300 class). It features a boxer-4 turbo charged engine. The car had also featured all-wheel-drive in the first season but the layout was replaced with an FR layout in 2010, which that season they got their first win in 39th Pokka Summer Special.

==== Speed records ====
On April 23, 1998, a Generation III Subaru Legacy set a new world speed record for mass-produced turbocharged station wagons with small engines (1,600 cc-2,000 cc class), clocking 270.532 km/h (168.101 mph) over one kilometer on Highway 10 in La Junta, Colorado. This record was previously set by a Generation II Subaru Legacy in 1993 at 249.981 km/h (155.331 mph).

The original Legacy speed record was set between January 2 and January 21, 1989, with three Japanese-spec turbocharged RS sedans at the Arizona Test Center outside of Phoenix, Arizona. It broke the 100,000 km FIA World Land Endurance Record by maintaining an average speed of 138.780 mph (223.345 km/h) for 447 hours, 44 minutes and 9.887 seconds, or 18.5 days. Pit stops were made every two hours with a driver change and refueling, while tire changes were made at 96‑hour intervals, or every 13,400 miles (21,565 km) driven.

== World market release schedule ==
Models have typically been released into Japan and selected World markets such as Australia, New Zealand and Chile in advance of the Continental European and North American markets, with the first three being right-hand drive and traditional strong markets for Subaru.

- Generation I: 1989–1993
- Generation II: 1993–1998
- Generation III: 1998–2003
- Generation IV: 2003–2009
- Generation V: 2009–2014
- Generation VI: 2015–2020

=== North American market release schedule ===
North America usually releases its models one to one and a half calendar years after Japan does, due to the fact that all current Legacies for the North American market have been built at Subaru of Indiana located in Lafayette, Indiana since 2004. Previously, all US Legacies were built at either the Indiana plant or the Ōta, Gunma plant in Japan starting in 1989. Notably, production of the fifth generation Legacy at SIA started roughly the same time it did in Gunma.

- Generation I: 1990–1994 (production started 1989)
- Generation II: 1995–1999 (production started 1994)
- Generation III: 2000–2004 (production started 1999)
- Generation IV: 2005–2009 (production started 2004)
- Generation V: 2010–2014 (production started 2009)
- Generation VI: 2015–2019 (production started 2014)
- Generation VII: 2020–2025 (production started 2019)

== Sales ==
On March 14, 2005, Subaru sold its three-millionth Legacy worldwide.

	Japan	World	Total
First-generation Legacy	620,444	204,168	824,612
Second-generation Legacy	495,471	466,354	961,825
Third-generation Legacy	434,624	467,447	902,071
Fourth-generation Legacy	204,776	106,716	311,492
Total	1,755,315	1,244,685	3,000,000
Production numbers as of March 14, 2005

=== Yearly sales ===
Calendar year	United States	Canada	Australia
2007	21,094	4,919	7,625
2008	22,605	4,089	6,432
2009	30,974	4,682	5,548
2010	38,725	3,269	6,203
2011	42,401	3,115	3,898
2012	47,127	2,687	4,407
2013	42,291	2,022	2,613
2014	52,270	2,924	1,041
2015	60,447	3,258	4,097
2016	65,306	3,001	3,495
2017	49,837	2,451	2,023
2018	40,109	1,902	1,595
2019	35,063	1,752	1,344
2020	27,240	1,390	925
2021	22,766	950	267
2022	22,605		—
2023	25,510		—
2024	19,591		—
2025	22,212		—
