= Association of Directory Publishers =

Voice of print and online directory publishers

The Association of Directory Publishers (ADP) is an international trade organization for print and online directory publishers. It intends to be a resource for collaborating, networking, and sharing best practices in directory publishing. Specifically, they offer services and tools for the creation of directories toward the advertising goals of their clients. It also functions with a governance system wherein each company has one vote, with which they can use to determine the leadership and direction of the Association.

== History ==
The group formed in 1898 as the Association of American Directory Publishers, headquartered in New York. It aimed "to improve the directory business." It changed its name to the Association of North American Directory Publishers in 1919. It has held annual meetings starting in 1899 and has published the Directory Bulletin. Officers have included George W. Overton and Ralph Lane Polk. Among the members in the 1920s:

- Action Pages
- Atkinson Erie Directory Company
- Atlanta City Directory Company
- W.H. Boyd Company
- Burch Directory Company
- Caron Directory Company
- Chicago Directory Company
- J.W. Clement Company
- Cleveland Directory Company
- Connelly Directory Company
- Fitzgerald Directory Company
- Gate City Directory Company
- Hartford Printing Company
- Henderson Directories Ltd.
- Hill Directory Company
- C.E. Howe Company
- Kimball Directory Company
- Leshnick Directory Company
- Los Angeles Directory Company
- John Lovell & Son Ltd.
- McCoy Directory Company
- H.A. Manning Company
- Maritime Directory Company
- Henry M. Meek Publishing Company
- Might Directories Ltd.
- Minneapolis Directory Company
- Piedmont Directory Company
- R.L. Polk & Company
- Polk-Gould Directory Company
- Polk-Husted Directory Company
- Polk-McAvoy Directory Company
- Polk's Southern Directory Company
- Portland Directory Company
- Price & Lee Company
- W.L. Richmond
- Roberts Bros Company
- Sampson & Murdock Company
- Soards Directory Company
- Utica Directory Publishing Company
- Williams Directory Company
- John F. Worley Directory Company
- Wright Directory Company

In 1992 the group renamed itself the "Association of Directory Publishers."
