= Ralph Lane Polk =

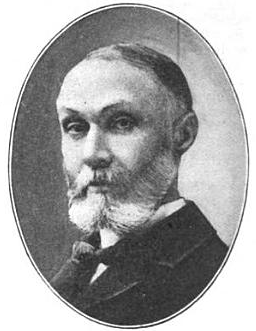
Portrait of Ralph L. Polk, ca.1905

Ralph Lane Polk (1849–1923) was an American compiler of facts and publisher of directories.

== Early life and education ==
Polk was born 12 September 1849 in Bellefontaine, Logan County, Ohio, to Rev. David Polk Jr. (b. Maryland, d. 15 April 1857 Brookville, Jefferson County, Pennsylvania) and his wife Mary Charlotte Warner (b. New Jersey), daughter of Jacob Warner. In 1860 Polk, four of his siblings and their widowed mother were living with his maternal grandfather in Trenton, New Jersey. Ralph Lane Polk's siblings included: Margaret Polk (b. 1839/40), Mary Polk (1841–1902). David R Polk (1844 - May 1871), Susan Polk (September 1846 - 12 May 1918), Louisa Polk (b. 12 May 1847 - 7 May 1916), and Charles Polk (b. 1853/54).

Polk was educated at the Pennington School, New Jersey.

== American Civil War ==
At the beginning of the American Civil War, people generally thought the war could be short with a settlement quickly reached. After years of carnage with the largest number of dead, diseased and maimed soldiers ever witnessed on the continent, large bounties were being paid to attract new recruits to what would become the last New Jersey Infantry Regiment formed for the war. About 25% of New Jersey soldiers died during the war. Polk volunteered at the age of 16, mustered in 16 February 1865 in Trenton, and left the state on 17 February. He became a Union Army drummer boy during the Siege of Petersburg, at the Third Battle of Petersburg on 2 April 1865, and at the Battle of Appomattox Court House on 9 April 1865, as a musician in Company G of the 40th New Jersey Infantry.

== Career ==
By 1880, Polk was living in Detroit with wife Amelia, working as a directory clerk, while paying for adopted daughter Frances to be a boarding pupil at the Ursuline Convent of the Sacred Heart's St. Ursula Academy in Toledo, Ohio.

Polk became a successful Detroit publisher and president of R.L. Polk & Co., directory publishers. He belonged to the Association of North American Directory Publishers. His grandson, Ralph Lane Polk, III (July 21, 1911 - February 9, 1984), was a later president of the company which was acquired by IHS Inc. on July 15, 2013.

== Marriage and family ==
Ralph Polk married Amelia Francis, widow of John Henry Hopkins. Polk adopted her daughter as his own. Born Frances Hopkins (28 January 1873 Detroit, Wayne County, Michigan – 2 August 1944 Detroit), she used the name Frances Hopkins Polk through her youth, and when married used the name Francis Polk Kemp. Her husband, Second Lieutenant Ulysses Grant Kemp, died as a result of injuries from a fall during a practice company cavalry charge, leaving her to return to Detroit with two-year old daughter Amy Polk Kemp (1897–1981), and seven months pregnant with daughter Dorothy Grant Kemp (25 October 1898 Detroit, Wayne County, Michigan – 22 July 1985 Birmingham, Oakland County, Michigan; political activist, concert pianist, second wife of Hall Roosevelt and mother of three daughters, sister-in-law of Eleanor Roosevelt). As a result of their tragedy, daughter and granddaughters were welcomed within Ralph and Amelia's Detroit home for the following decades, as Ralph's grandfather had provided for him in his mother's time of need.

Ralph and Amelia had one son, Ralph Lane Polk, Jr. (10 September 1882 Detroit, Wayne County, Michigan – 5 August 1949 Bloomfield Hills, Oakland County, Michigan). He was an executive and eventually a president of R.L. Polk & Co., and had a wife and son.

== Death ==
Polk died on 21 August 1923 in Saint Paul, Ramsey County, Minnesota, during a business trip. His body was returned to Detroit for memorial services and burial.
