= Donegal International Rally =

Car race in Ireland

- Category: Rally
- Inaugural season: 1972
- Drivers' champion: (Northern Ireland) Callum Devine
- Co-Drivers' champion: (Republic of Ireland) Noel O Sullivan

Irish Tarmac Rally Championship

Celtic Rally Trophy

European Rally Championship (1975-1979)

Donegal International Rally
- Dates: June 19, 2026 - June 21, 2026 TBC
- Frequency: Annual
- Location: County Donegal
- Country: (Republic of Ireland) Ireland
- Most recent: 2025
- Organiser: Donegal Motor Club
- Sponsor: Wilton Recycling
- Website: Website

The Donegal International Rally is an annual car race in County Donegal, Ireland. It is one of the most important events in the Irish rallying calendar since 1972, and is one of the country's most challenging rallies. Organized by the Donegal Motor Club, the annual event begins and ends in Letterkenny.

The Rally has been one of the rounds of the Irish Tarmac Rally Championship for a number of years.

== History ==
=== 1972 ===
The winner of the first event was Cahal Curley. When the event began in 1972, it was based in Downings but afterwards it moved to Letterkenny.

=== 1985 ===
At the 1985 event there was just a one-second difference between the top two finishing cars.

=== 2001 ===
The event, along with most events that year, was cancelled due to an outbreak of foot-and-mouth disease.

This was significant blow to the local economy. The event is estimated to be worth over €20 million to the Donegal economy each year. The rally attracts approximately 120,000 spectators each year.

=== 2002 ===
At the 2002 event two marshals were killed. The two 22-year-old men, one from Moville, the other from Crossmaglen, died when a car crashed into spectators at around 2.00 pm. Three men were also injured. The remaining stages of the event were cancelled after the serious accident on Stage Two. Andrew Nesbitt was announced as winner as he led the rally at the time of the accident.

This led to the Motorsport Commission to inspect safety at future events.

=== 2008 ===
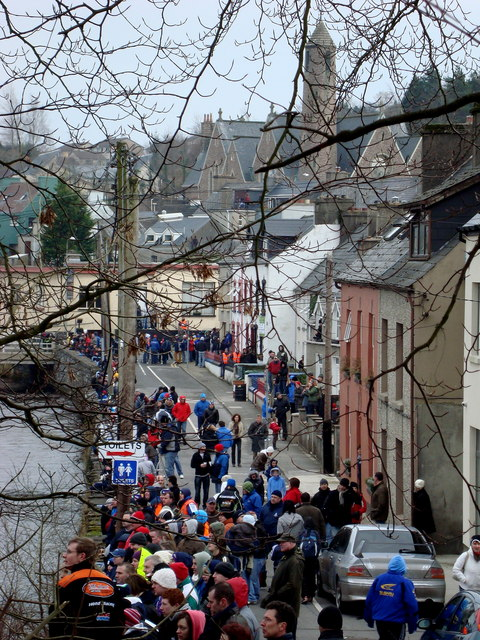
Crowds at the 2008 Rally in Donegal Town.

At the 2008 event, an 18-year-old spectator died after being hit by a competing car at 3.30 pm. The accident happened at Ballyare, about four miles from Letterkenny. The man was pronounced dead at the scene. The road was closed and did not re-open for some time. Organisers cancelled the rally for the rest of the day and later announced that the event would be abandoned as a mark of respect Eugene Donnelly was announced as winner as he led the rally at the time of the accident.

=== 2010 ===
On Saturday afternoon, 19 June, a co-driver died after the car he was in crashed on the Knockalla stage, south of Portsalon, shortly after 3 pm. Thomas Maguire, aged 26, from Longwood, County Meath was killed and his driver, Shane Buckley, critically injured. As a result, the final stage of the rally was cancelled. This was the first time in the rally's history that a competitor was killed during the rally.

=== 2019 ===
The Rally continued to be a counting round of the FIA Celtic Rally Trophy since 2016. The event attracted a lot of international attention, including Ken Block who showcased his Ford Escort Cosworth. Ken crashed out at Special Stage 2 on the first day, but was back the second day under rally 2 rule.

Due to high traffic and spectator volumes, Special Stage 7 on the first day had to be cancelled as a safety measure. On the third day of the rally, 23 June at approximately 12:30 pm, three-time and defending champion Manus Kelly crashed during a stage on the Fanad Head loop. His Hyundai i20 R5 went through a hedge into a field and was extensively damaged. Gardaí (police) confirmed that Kelly had died in the incident. His injured co-driver Donall Barrett was taken to hospital and the remaining stages of the rally were cancelled. A 41-year-old father of five and a prominent local businessman, Kelly had been elected to Donegal County Council less than a month before his death. Numerous politicians and representatives of the Irish motorsport community expressed sympathy to his family and paid tribute to the late champion, with Taoiseach Leo Varadkar calling him a "phenomenal motorsportsman." At his funeral, 2014 champion Declan Boyle drove Kelly's Subaru Impreza S12B WRC before the funeral cortège, with Kelly's son in the passenger seat. Following the funeral mass, Kelly's brothers and friends carried his coffin across the Donegal International Rally ramp.

=== 2020 ===
On 12 March, all motorsports events were postponed due to the coronavirus pandemic. On 20 March, Motorsport Ireland issued a statement that all motorsport events were suspended until 1 June. On 28 April, the Tarmac Rally Organisers' Association (TROA) announced that the 2020 Irish Tarmac Rally Championship was cancelled. There were hopes that the event could still go ahead anyway, as a non-counting round of the Irish Tarmac Rally Championship.

Shortly after the Motorsport Ireland announcement, messages on Facebook circulated that the Donegal Rally was cancelled. Other sources claimed that it had been postponed. Donegal Motor Club stepped in to correct the rumours that the event was not cancelled, and if permitted, would go ahead as planned on 19–21 June. However, after the government released a roadmap on easing the COVID-19 restrictions on 6 May, Motorsport Ireland released a statement the same day that, in line with Phase 4 of this roadmap, the suspension of all motor sports events was extended until the 20 July. Rally events fall under Phase 5 of the guidelines and would not be considered until after 10 August. The restrictions continued into 2021.

=== 2021 ===
As the country remained subject to restrictions aimed at controlling the COVID-19 pandemic, the TROA made an announcement on 3 February 2021 to cancel the 2021 Championship. As vaccinations were progressing, at the end of May, Motorsport Ireland announced that motorsports events could resume from 7 June, subject to local restrictions. Remaining restrictions made it impossible for the Donegal International Rally to take place. Instead, a virtual Donegal Rally was held on the traditional days of the event – a series of virtual interviews, videos of past rallies, and social media posts.

=== 2022 ===
This year's event consisted of 301 kilometres over 20 stages. It was a counting round of the Irish Tarmac Rally Championship and the Celtic Rally Trophy. The starting grid was capped at a maximum of 160 competitors, plus 25 historic and 25 junior competitors. The starting fee was €1,600. The event was labelled as the biggest rally of the year in Ireland. An incident occurred where a 62-year-old man was arrested after damaging one of the competitor cars by cutting wires and the fuel lines.

=== 2025 ===
The 2025 Wilton Donegal International Rally was held over three days between 20–22 June. It once again was part of the Irish Tarmac Rally Championship. The rally consisted of 20 stages totalling 271 kilometres. It was won by Callum Devine for the third year in a row. He finished just over 20 seconds ahead of Meirion Evans in second place. Former World Rally Championship driver and current ERC champion Hayden Paddon was a late entrant to the event and was second overall after the first day, however he retired from the rally after a roll on Special Stage 13.

=== 2026 ===
A teenage boy was killed, and other spectators injured, as a result of an incident on Saturday 20 June at Trentagh. Following this, the remainder of the event was cancelled.

== Winners ==
Year	Driver	Co-Driver	Car	Notes
1972	(Northern Ireland) Cahal Curley	(United Kingdom) Peter Scott	BMW 2002	
1973	(Northern Ireland) Cahal Curley	(United Kingdom) Terry Harryman	Porsche Carrera	
1974	(Northern Ireland) Cahal Curley	(United Kingdom) Victor Armstrong	Porsche Carrera	
1975	(Germany) Achim Warmbold	(United Kingdom) John Davenport	BMW 2002	
1976	(Northern Ireland) Brian Nelson	(United Kingdom) Malcolm Neill	Porsche Carrera	
1977	(Republic of Ireland) Billy Coleman	(United Kingdom) Austin Frazer	Lancia Stratos HF	
1978	(Finland) Ari Vatanen	(United Kingdom) Peter Bryant	Ford Escort RS1800	
1979	(Northern Ireland) Brian Nelson	(United Kingdom) Rodney Cole	Ford Escort RS1800	
1980	(Scotland) Jimmy McRae	(United Kingdom) Mike Nicholson	Vauxhall Chevette HSR	
1981	(Republic of Ireland) John Lyons	(Republic of Ireland) Bill Moffett	Ford Escort RS1800	
1982	(Republic of Ireland) John Lyons	(Republic of Ireland) Bill Moffett	Ford Escort RS1800	
1983	(Republic of Ireland) Vincent Bonner	(Republic of Ireland) Seamus McGettigan	Ford Escort RS1800	
1984	(Republic of Ireland) Billy Coleman	(Republic of Ireland) Ronan Morgan	Opel Manta 400	
1985	(Republic of Ireland) Billy Coleman	(Republic of Ireland) Ronan Morgan	Porsche 911 SC RS	
1986	(Republic of Ireland) Billy Coleman	(Republic of Ireland) Ronan Morgan	MG Metro 6R4	
1987	(Northern Ireland) Bertie Fisher	(United Kingdom) Austin Frazer	Opel Manta 400	
1988	(United Kingdom) Mark Lovell	(United Kingdom) Terry Harryman	Ford Sierra RS Cosworth	
1989	(Wales) David Llewellin	(United Kingdom) Phil Short	Toyota Celica GT-Four	
1990	(Republic of Ireland) Austin McHale	(Republic of Ireland) Dermot O'Gorman	BMW M3	
1991	(Republic of Ireland) James Cullen	(United Kingdom) Ellen Morgan	Ford Sierra RS Cosworth	
1992	(Northern Ireland) Bertie Fisher	(Republic of Ireland) Rory Kennedy	Subaru Legacy RS	
1993	(Northern Ireland) Bertie Fisher	(Republic of Ireland) Rory Kennedy	Subaru Legacy RS	
1994	(United Kingdom) Stephen Finlay	(United Kingdom) Roy Campbell	Ford Escort RS Cosworth	
1995	(Northern Ireland) Bertie Fisher	(Republic of Ireland) Rory Kennedy	Subaru Legacy RS	
1996	(Northern Ireland) Andrew Nesbitt	(Republic of Ireland) George Millar	Toyota Celica Turbo 4WD	
1997	(Republic of Ireland) Austin McHale	(Republic of Ireland) Brian Murphy	Toyota Celica Turbo 4WD	
1998	(Northern Ireland) Andrew Nesbitt	(Republic of Ireland) James O'Brien	Toyota Celica Turbo 4WD	
1999	(Republic of Ireland) James Cullen	(United Kingdom) Ellen Morgan	Subaru Impreza 555	
2000	(Northern Ireland) Andrew Nesbitt	(Republic of Ireland) James O'Brien	Subaru Impreza S5 WRC	
2001	Event did not run, foot-and-mouth disease outbreak			
2002	(Northern Ireland) Andrew Nesbitt	(Republic of Ireland) James O'Brien	Subaru Impreza S6 WRC	Event Cancelled after Special Stage 2
2003	(Northern Ireland) Andrew Nesbitt	(Republic of Ireland) James O'Brien	Subaru Impreza S7 WRC	
2004	(Republic of Ireland) Eugene Donnelly	(Republic of Ireland) Paul Kiely	Toyota Corolla WRC	
2005	(Republic of Ireland) Eugene Donnelly	(Republic of Ireland) Paul Kiely	Toyota Corolla WRC	
2006	(Northern Ireland) Andrew Nesbitt	(Republic of Ireland) James O'Brien	Mitsubishi Lancer WRC 05	
2007	(France) Sébastien Loeb	(Monaco) Daniel Elena	Citroën C4 WRC	
2008	(Republic of Ireland) Eugene Donnelly	(Republic of Ireland) Paul Kiely	Škoda Fabia WRC	Event Stopped after Specia Stage 11
2009	(Republic of Ireland) Gareth MacHale	(Republic of Ireland) Brian Murphy	Ford Focus RS WRC 06	
2010	(Republic of Ireland) Gareth MacHale	(Republic of Ireland) Brian Murphy	Ford Focus RS WRC 06	Event Stopped after Special Stage 11
2011	(Republic of Ireland) Tim McNulty	(Republic of Ireland) Paul Kiely	Subaru Impreza S12B WRC 07	
2012	(Northern Ireland) Garry Jennings	(Republic of Ireland) Neil Doherty	Subaru Impreza S14 WRC 08	
2013	(Republic of Ireland) Sam Moffett	(Republic of Ireland) James O'Reilly	Subaru Impreza WRC	
2014	(Republic of Ireland) Declan Boyle	(Republic of Ireland) Brian Boyle	Subaru Impreza S12B WRC 07	
2015	(Northern Ireland) Garry Jennings	(Republic of Ireland) Rory Kennedy	Subaru Impreza S12B WRC 07	
2016	(Republic of Ireland) Manus Kelly	(Republic of Ireland) Donall Barrett	Subaru Impreza S12B WRC 07	
2017	(Republic of Ireland) Manus Kelly	(Republic of Ireland) Donall Barrett	Subaru Impreza S12B WRC 07	
2018	(Republic of Ireland) Manus Kelly	(Republic of Ireland) Donall Barrett	Subaru Impreza S12B WRC 07	
2019	(Republic of Ireland) Sam Moffett	(Republic of Ireland) James Fulton	Ford Fiesta RS WRC	Event stopped after Special Stage 15
2020	Event cancelled due to COVID-19 pandemic			
2021	Event cancelled due to COVID-19 pandemic			
2022	(Republic of Ireland) Josh Moffett	(Republic of Ireland) Andy Hayes	Hyundai i20 R5	
2023	(Northern Ireland) Callum Devine	(Republic of Ireland) Noel O Sullivan	Volkswagen Polo GTI R5	
2024	(Northern Ireland) Callum Devine	(Republic of Ireland) Noel O Sullivan	Škoda Fabia RS Rally2	
2025	(Northern Ireland) Callum Devine	(Republic of Ireland) Noel O Sullivan	Škoda Fabia RS Rally2	

* as of 2022

Driver most wins
(Northern Ireland) Andrew Nesbitt	6
(Republic of Ireland) Billy Coleman	4
(Northern Ireland) Bertie Fisher	4

Driver most starts
(Republic of Ireland) Robbie Peoples	29
(Republic of Ireland) Daniel Conaghan	28
(Republic of Ireland) Ivan Stewart	28
(Republic of Ireland) James Cullen	25
(Republic of Ireland) Thomas Keys	25
(Republic of Ireland) Austin MacHale	24
(Republic of Ireland) Seamus Gallagher	23
(Republic of Ireland) Damien Gallagher	23
(Northern Ireland) Bertie Fisher	22

Most stage wins
(Northern Ireland) Bertie Fisher	110
(Northern Ireland) Andrew Nesbitt	103
(Republic of Ireland) Austin MacHale	81
(Republic of Ireland) Billy Coleman	61
(Republic of Ireland) James Cullen	60

== Sponsors ==
The event was previously sponsored by Shell, Topaz Energy and Joule. The current sponsors of the Donegal International Rally are Wilton Recycling and The Mount Errigal Hotel.
