= Cork 20 Rally =

Motorsport event held near Cork, Ireland

- Category: Rally
- Country: Ireland
- Region: County Cork
- Affiliations: Munster Car Club
- Inaugural season: 1912
- Drivers' champion: (Republic of Ireland) Callum Devine
- Co-Drivers' champion: (Republic of Ireland) Brian Hoy; Ford Fiesta R5
- Official website: Official Facebook page

Irish Tarmac Rally Championship

National Rally Championship (1966-1976)

Southern 4 Rally Championship

South East Stages Rally Championship

Cork 20 Rally
- Dates: Last weekend of September
- Frequency: Annual
- Most recent: 19 September 2021
- Organiser: Munster Car Club
- Sponsor: O'Connell Group
- Website: Website

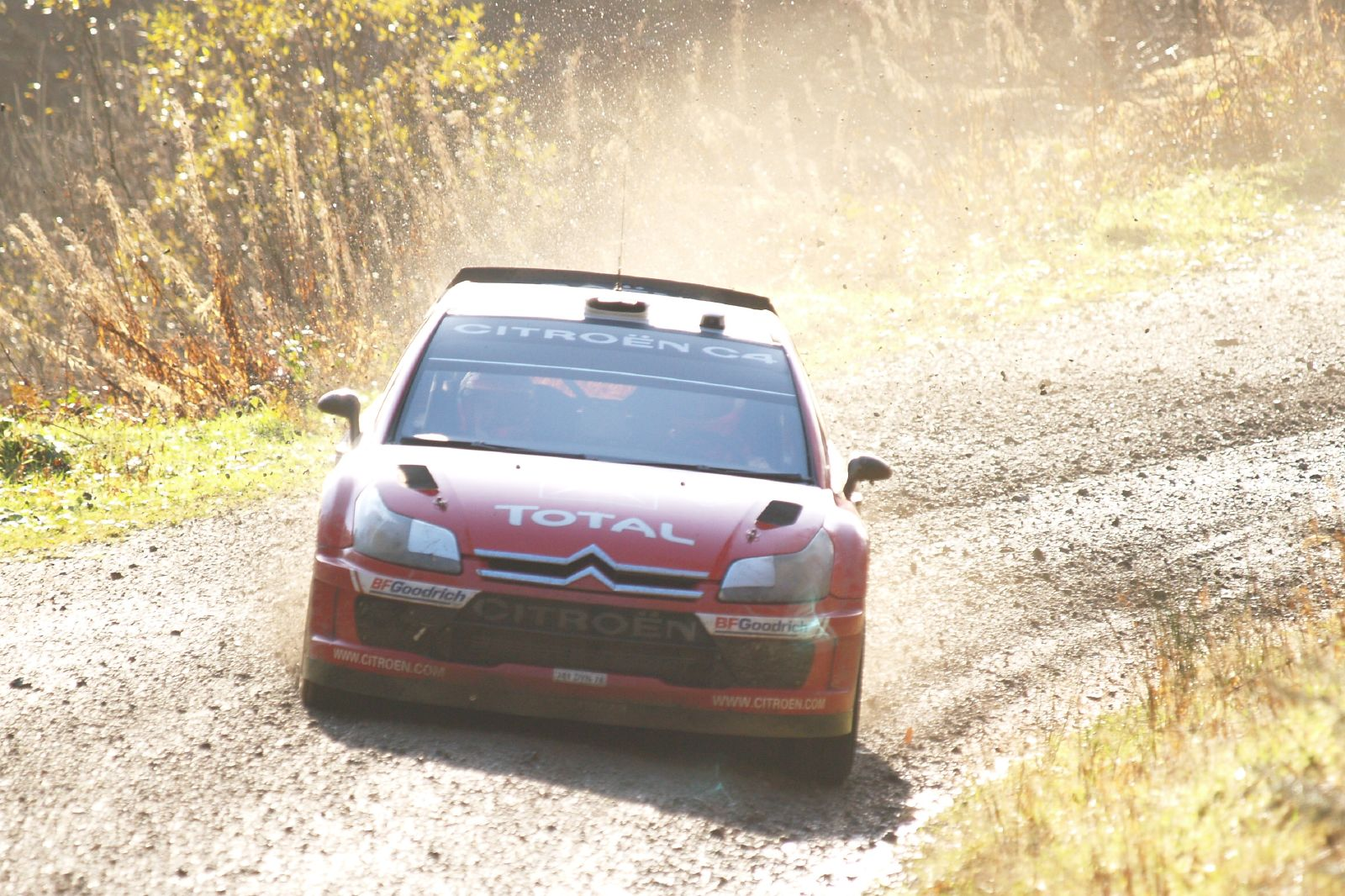
Sébastien Loeb 2007 Cork 20 rally winner

The Cork 20 Rally or Cork 20 International Rally is an annual motorsport rallying event run by the Munster Car Club and held in the vicinity of Cork in Ireland. The Cork 20 Rally was first held in 1912, with the original event named because it spanned 20 hours.

It is run as a round within the Irish Tarmac Rally Championship, and draws competitors from Ireland North and South, Britain, and continental Europe. The rally was part of the National Rally Championship between 1966 and 1976. It became a full international rally in 1977.

== History ==
The event has been run in different parts of County Cork since the 1960s, with Kinsale acting as the main hub throughout the 1970s, and Cork city being home to the event a few times also. The final stage of the 1980 event started on Patrick Street and went through Grand Parade and the South Mall in front of thousands of spectators. In later years, the event was run in the north and east Cork regions, with some sections run in mid Cork also. The event returned to West Cork in 2010.

The format of the original rally was similar to the Monte Carlo Rally, in that there were several starting points; Cork, Dublin and Galway. The cars would then meet at a designated town (for example Clonmel). The final leg would then run from that town into Cork city. The roads were not officially closed for these early events.

The event has been run by various organisers since 1912. In the 1950s, the Cork and Munster Motorcycle Club, based at the neo-classical building Vernon Mount, gave their support to the Cork 20 Rally. With various affiliations, the Cork Motor Club became active in motorsport in the Cork area from 1976 onwards. As of 2019, the event was run by the Munster Car Club.

=== 2007 ===
In 2007, WRC drivers Sébastien Loeb (C4 WRC), Daniel Sordo (Xsara WRC), and Mikko Hirvonen (Focus RS WRC 06/07) all started the rally, heading a field of 130 of which 17 were World Rally Cars. Sébastien Loeb won the competition after two days and 14 stages.

=== 2019 ===
The 2019 CB Toolhire Cork 20 International Rally event took place on 28 and 29 September 2019. The rally was the final counting round of the Irish Tarmac Rally Championship, a counting round of the ERT Celtic Rally Trophy, Southern 4 Rally Championship & South East Stages Rally Championship.

The rally consisted of 13 special stages, totaling to 208.35 km (129.46 mi), and 423.30 km (263.03 mi) of liaison. A total of 187 entries were enlisted to the event. The overall winners were the International Class entrants Marty McCormack and Barney Mitchell in a Volkswagen Polo R5. The 'national section' of the rally was won by Damian Toner & Michael Coady competing in the Modified Class. The Junior Class winners were Kieran Reen & Mark O'Leary.

=== 2020 ===
The rally was scheduled to take place on 26 and 27 September 2020. Because of the on-going restrictions to address the COVID-19 pandemic in Ireland, on 25 June 2020 the Munster Car Club board of directors took a decision to cancel the 2020 rally. The Irish Tarmac Rally Championship had already been cancelled in late April.

=== 2021 ===
The event was provisionally planned as a stage of the FIA ERT Celtic Rally Trophy on 25-26 September 2021. However, as the COVID-19 pandemic continued into 2021 and all motorsports events in Ireland remained suspended, the Irish Tarmac Rally Championship, which traditionally featured Cork 20 Rally, was cancelled. At the end of May 2021, as the vaccinations were progressing, Motorsport Ireland announced that motorsports events could resume from 7 June 2021, subject to local restrictions. There was no championship, but some event dates were announced.

Cork 20 Rally was moved to 19 September, and took place as a one-day event, consisting of 117.30 km (72.89 mi) in 9 stages (3×3 format). The organisers also featured a 4km Saturday shakedown stage at the Kartworld complex, Watergrasshill. This was the first rally event in Ireland in the 18 months since the first COVID-19 lockdown. The event attracted 165 entries, with 151 starting on the day. The overall winners were Callum Devine and Brian Hoy in a Ford Fiesta R5.

== Winners ==
Past winners of the event have included:

- 2025: Michael Boyle, Dermot McCafferty (Škoda Fabia RS Rally2)
- 2024: Callum Devine, N. O'Sullivan Jr (Škoda Fabia RS Rally2)
- 2023: Callum Devine, N. O'Sullivan Jr (Volkswagen Polo GTI R5)
- 2022: Josh Moffett, Andy Hayes (Hyundai i20 R5)
- 2021: Callum Devine, Brian Hoy (Ford Fiesta Rally2)
- 2019: Marty McCormack, Mitchell Barney (Volkswagen Polo GTI R5)
- 2018: Roy White, James O'Brien (Ford Fiesta WRC)
- 2017: Sam Moffett, Karl Atkinson (Ford Fiesta R5)
- 2016: Josh Moffett, Jason McKenna (Ford Fiesta R5)
- 2015: Donagh Kelly, Conor Foley (Ford Focus RS WRC)
- 2014: Daragh O'Riordan, Tony McDaid (Ford Fiesta RS WRC)
- 2013: Daragh O'Riordan, Tony McDaid (Ford Fiesta RS WRC)
- 2012: Daragh O'Riordan, Tony McDaid (Subaru Impreza WRC)
- 2011: Daragh O'Riordan, Tony McDaid (Subaru Impreza WRC)
- 2010: Gareth MacHale, Brian Murphy (Ford Focus RS WRC)
- 2009: Gareth MacHale, Brian Murphy (Ford Focus RS WRC)
- 2008: Eamonn Boland, Damien Morrissey (Subaru Impreza WRC)
- 2007: Sébastien Loeb, Daniel Elena (Citroen C4 WRC)
- 2006: Mark Higgins, Rory Kennedy (Subaru Impreza WRC)
- 2005: Tim McNulty, Anthony Nestor (Subaru Impreza WRC)
- 2004: Eugene Donnelly, Paul Kiely (Toyota Corolla WRC)
- 2003: Eamonn Boland, Damien Morrissey (Subaru Impreza WRC)
- 2002: Andrew Nesbitt, James O'Brien (Subaru Impreza WRC)
- 2001: CANCELLED
- 2000 (Sunday Run 2000): Thomas Randles, Diarmuid Lynch (Ford Escort MKII
- 2000: Andrew Nesbitt, James O'Brien (Subaru Impreza WRC)
- 1999: Ian Greer, Dean Beckett (Totota Celica GT-Four)
- 1998: Ian Greer, Dean Beckett (Totota Celica GT-Four)
- 1996: Gabriel Snow, Pat Moloughney (Ford Escort Cosworth)
- 1995: Frank Meagher, Pat Moloughney (Ford Escort Cosworth)
- 1994: Kenny McKinstry, Robbie Philpott (Subaru Legacy RS)
- 1993: James Cullen, Ellen Morgan (Ford Escort Cosworth)
- 1992: Bertie Fisher, Rory Kennedy (Subaru Legacy RS)
- 1991: Kenny McKinstry, Robbie Philpott (Ford Sierra RS Cosworth)
- 1990: Austin MacHale, Dermot O'Gorman (BMW M3 E30)
- 1989: Saeed Al-Hajri, Steve Bond (Ford Sierra RS Cosworth)
- 1988: Mark Lovell, Terry Harryman (Ford Sierra RS Cosworth)
- 1987: Austin MacHale, Christy Farrell (Opel Manta 400)
- 1986: Billy Coleman, Ronan Morgan (MG Metro 6R4)
- 1985: Austin MacHale, Christy Farrell (Opel Manta 400)
- 1984: Billy Coleman, Ronan Morgan (Opel Manta 400)
- 1983: Austin MacHale, Christy Farrell (Vauxhall Chevette)
- 1982: Demi Fitzgerald, Paddy Kavanagh (Vauxhall Chevette)
- 1981: Ger Buckley, John Caplice (Vauxhall Chevette)
- 1980: Jimmy McRae, Frank Main (Vauxhall Chevette)
- 1979: Ger Buckley, John Caplice (Ford Escort RS)
- 1978: Ari Vatanen, Arne Hertz (Ford Escort RS)
- 1977: Ger Buckley, John Caplice (Ford Escort RS)
- 1976: Billy Coleman, Dan O'Sullivan (Ford Escort RS)
- 1975: Cathal Curley, Austin Frazer (Porsche 911 Carrera)
- 1974: Ger Buckley, John Caplice (Ford Escort RS)
- 1973: Ger Buckley, John Caplice (Ford Escort RS)
- 1972: Billy Coleman, Noel Davin (Alpine-Renault A110)
- 1971: Billy Coleman, Noel Davin (Alpine-Renault A110)
- 1970: Billy Coleman, Noel Davin (Ford Escort Twin Cam)
- 1969: Mick Barry, Dan Kavanagh (Ford Escort Twin Cam)
- 1968: Rosemary Smith, Ricky Foote (Hillman Imp)
- 1967: Rosemary Smith, Brian Melia (Hillman Imp)
- 1966: Charlie Gunn, Norman Henderson (Ford Cortina GT)
- 1965: Noel Smith, Ricky Foote (Austin Mini Cooper S)
- 1964: Paul O'Flynn, Brian Geary (Morris Mini Cooper)
- 1963: Joe Byrne, Brian Geary (Volkswagen Beetle)
- 1961: Joe O'Mahony, Gordon Backer (Volkswagen Beetle)
- 1960: Sheila O'Clery, Mike Ivis (Austin)
- 1959: Des Cullen, Jim Cullen (NSU Prinz)
- 1958: Paddy Hopkirk, Jack Scott (Volkswagen Beetle)
- 1957: P.B. Deale, Dave Wheeler (Volkswagen Beetle)
- 1956: Paddy Hopkirk, John A. Garvey (Volkswagen Beetle)
- 1955: J.G. Dyer, B. MacMahon (Ford Anglia)
- 1954: Joe O'Mahoney, R.F. O'Sullivan (Volkswagen Beetle)
- 1953: Joe O'Mahoney, R.F. O'Sullivan (Volkswagen Beetle)
- 1952: Joe O'Mahoney, Reggie Tilson (Volkswagen Beetle)

The driver with the most wins at the Cork 20 Rally is Billy Coleman with 6. Behind Coleman, Ger Buckley has 5 wins, Austin MacHale and Daragh O'Riordan are tied with 4 wins each and, as of 2026, Callum Devine had 3 wins at the rally.
