= West Cork Rally =

- Category: Rally
- Inaugural season: 1977
- Drivers' champion: (Republic of Ireland) Josh Moffett
- Co-Drivers' champion: (Republic of Ireland) Andy Hayes; Toyota GR Yaris Rally2

Irish Tarmac Rally Championship

Southern 4 Rally Championship

British Rally Championship (past)

National Rally Championship (past)

West Cork Rally
- Dates: 13 March 2026 - 15 March 2026
- Frequency: Annual
- Location: County Cork
- Country: Ireland
- Most recent: 2026
- Organiser: Cork Motor Club
- Sponsor: Clonakilty Park Hotel
- Website: Website

The West Cork Rally, Clonakilty Park Hotel West Cork Rally is an annual motorsport tarmac rallying event held in Clonakilty, County Cork, Ireland. Promoted and organised by Cork Motor Club, the rally began in 1977 and has run on or near St. Patricks Weekend ever since with just a few exceptions (1987, 2001, 2020 and 2021). It is, according to a book about the rally's early history, an "important local cultural and economic event".

It was a counting round of the Irish National Rally Championship for a number of years in the early days. In 2015 it became a full round of the Irish Tarmac Rally Championship for the first time, and remains a regular round since. While it became known as predominantly a clubman rally, it ran under an International Permit in 1986 and since 2016. In 2019 the West Cork Rally hosted a round of the British Rally Championship.

== History ==
=== Early years (1977-1980) ===
The first West Cork Rally took place on 18 & 19 March 1977, and from an initial entry of 80 cars, 68 made the start with 28 classified finishers. Ger Buckley & John Caplice were scheduled to do the event, but in the week leading up to the rally Billy Coleman was looking to drive his cousins car. The plan was for Billy to drive and Ger to co-drive, but after a test Ger decided it was not for him and that his regular co-driver John Caplice would sit with Billy instead. John Caplice said he wasn't aware of this until the morning of the rally when he arrived in Clonakilty! However the partnership was very successful and they took a very comprehensive win.

The second event in 1978 saw the rally upgraded to a counting round of the new Shellsport Stages Rally Championship (the modern day National Rally Championship). An ambitious route under the watchful eye of the relatively youthful Michael "Bones" O'Connor saw the 21 stage rally start in Clonakilty and end up in Bantry for the lunch halt. The same stages were tackled in reverse all the way back towards Clonakily that day with a total of thirteen tough test in mainly appalling weather. The second day had eight more stages, and the weather didn't let up, but Mick & Anne O'Connell were the victors in somewhat controversial circumstances. They were off the road for over 20 minutes on a stage that was ultimately cancelled. Ger Buckley his closest rival wasn't happy and appealed the decision to the RIAC, but the O'Connells were eventually awarded the win. The event lost its championship status for 1979, but that didn't hinder its progress as by 1980 upwards of 160 crews were starting the event, many of them travelling from all parts of the U.K., including Billy Coleman, Roger Clark, Malcolm Wilson (now head of Ford Motorsport), Jimmy McRae (father of Colin McRae), Ger Buckley and Bertie Fisher. The demanding West Cork stages proved too much for many of the big names who were forced out with Ger Buckley claiming the title that year.

=== The Zanussi years (1981-1986) ===
1981 saw Zanussi come on board as the events first major title sponsor and Tony Pond became the first overseas driver to win the rally in a Vauxhall Chevette HSR. Zanussi were to stay on board as title sponsors for six years in total as the rallys profile grew each year. This was the era of Richie Heeley, Russell Brookes, Frank Meagher, Mark Lovell and Kenny McKinstry. Along with coming into the National Rally Championship again (up to 1985), it was also a counting round of the EARS / Motoring News championship which attracted a lot of U.K. crews. Over 170 crews started the 1984 event with many more, including Billy Coleman, on a bulging reserve list. Cork Motor Club applied for an International permit for 1986 which saw it removed from the National series, but still not part of the Tarmac Championship. Frank Meagher won the 1986 event which was his first international win. There were also entrants from France and West Germany for this rally.

=== Cancellation and rebuilding (1987-1994) ===
A series of accidents involving spectators in other events took place in 1986. Event insurance premiums skyrocketed and that saw all rallying in Ireland come to a halt for the first six months of 1987. As a result, the West Cork Rally did not run in 1987, and it dropped back to national status in 1988. It was still able to start 120 crews despite not attracting the star quality names of previous years. The early 1990s showed increasing recovery in participant numbers and the popularity of the rally. Drivers like Frank O'Mahony and Bob Fowden gained valuable experience in these years.

=== Celtic Tiger years (1995-2007) ===
The 1990s were an exciting time for the rally. Rallying in general was becoming more popular and this was reflected in the West Cork Rally. The rally was very competitive with many leading talents taking part including John Price, Bob Fowden and Liam O'Callaghan. Both Price and O’Callaghan won the rally twice but both were outdone by Fowden who claimed the title three times – 1995, 1997 and 1999. Fowden is something of an iconic figure at the Rally and his three titles are the most won by any driver. Other well-regarded drivers in this period were Frank O'Mahony, Gwyndaf Evans, Denis Cronin and Liam McCarthy. Liam, a Dunmanway man who has competed in 20 West Cork Rallies, finally won the event in 2009. In 1998, the rally saw its first local winners in Donal O'Donovan and Pat Lordan. The late 1990s and early 2000s saw the rise of new drivers financed by the booming Celtic Tiger years. Drivers like Stephen Murphy, Derek McGarrity, Eamon Boland, Michael Barrable and Donie O'Sullivan all appeared in Clonakilty with some of the finest machinery available. 2000 marked the first victory for a Subaru Impreza WRC in the hands of Stephen Murphy. Since that year, the Impreza WRC has won eight times, becoming the dominant car. Before the Subaru came along, Ford cars reigned supreme. The first four winners were all Ford Escort RS1800s and later the Ford Sierra Cosworth and Ford Escort Cosworth were strong, the Escort Cosworth being driven by Bob Fowden for each of his victories.

The rally has only failed to run twice in the past 49 years - the 1987 insurance crisis after a number of incidents in 1986 and 2001 cancellation to prevent the spread of Foot and Mouth disease.

=== Recession years (2008-2013) ===
With the downturn in the economic climate, drivers faced greater challenges getting cars to compete in the rally. Despite these challenges, the rally continued to thrive and was an essential element to the Clonakilty tourism season.

=== Tarmac Championship years (2014-present) ===
Donagh Kelly created history on the 2016 event when he became only the second driver to win the rally three times, and the first achieve this in successive years. As of 2018 he was won the event a remarkable five times in a row. The rally was a counting round for the Tarmac Modified Championship only in 2014, and was a full counting round in 2015. The West Cork Rally has run under an international permit since 2016 and was the opening round of the 2018 Irish Tarmac Rally Championship following the cancellation of the Galway International Rally for 2018. The event received a lot of local support, and seen as an opening of the tourism season.

The 2019 event was the second round of both the Irish Tarmac Rally Championship and the British Rally Championship as well as the opening round of the PlasticBags.ie Southern 4 Rally Championship. The event starred Mikko Hirvonen, who competed in Ford Escort Mk2 and won the National Section of the rally.

The 2019 Clonakilty Hotel West Cork Rally event took place on 16 & 17 March. The race was run by Greg McCarthy, Clerk Of The Course and the Deputy COC Steve Davis. The rally consisted of 15 special stages, totaling to 240 km (150 mi), and 160 km (99 mi) of liaison. Including juniors and historics a total of 205 entries were enlisted to the event. Overall winner was Craig Breen, only 22.2s ahead of Alister Fisher.

The 2020 Clonakilty Park Hotel West Cork Rally was scheduled to take place on 14–15 March, and traditionally host Irish Tarmac Rally Championship round as well as the British Rally Championship round for the second year running. On 12 March the event was postponed in the light of the coronavirus pandemic. On 20 March, Motorsport Ireland issued a statement that all motorsport events are suspended until 1 June 2020. On 28 April the Tarmac Rally Organisers' Association announced that the 2020 Irish Tarmac Rally Championship is cancelled.

The 2025 Clonakilty Park Hotel West Cork Rally took place between the Friday the 14th and Sunday the 16th of March. It hosted the first round of the Irish Tarmac Rally Championship after the Galway International Rally was postponed. The rally consisted of eighteen stages, including two night stages on the Friday. Keith Cronin lead after the 1st and 2nd days, Jon Armstrong would then go to finish SS18 34.8 seconds up on Cronin. However Armstrong would be excluded from the finishers list after receiving outside assistance to reach Parc fermé after the final stage.

The 2026 Clonakilty Park Hotel West Cork Rally took place between Friday the 13th and Sunday the 15th of March. It was the second round of the Irish Tarmac Rally Championship following the Galway International Rally. The rally consisted of 16 stages with the first of two night stages on the Friday starting in the centre of Clonakilty. Josh Moffett would win the rally having led after every stage of the rally. This would mark Moffett's third success at the rally tying him in second place alongside Bob Fowden in the list of most victories, only behind Donagh Kelly on five. Callum Devine finished second, 9.9 seconds off Moffett, having overtaken third place Eddie Doherty on the final stage.

== Roll of honour ==
| Year | Driver | Co-driver | Car |
|---|---|---|---|
| 1977 | (Republic of Ireland) Billy Coleman | John Caplice | Ford Escort RS1800 |
| 1978 | (Republic of Ireland) Mick O'Connell | Anne O'Connell | Ford Escort RS1800 |
| 1979 | (Republic of Ireland) Ger Buckley | John Caplice | Ford Escort RS1800 |
| 1980 | (Republic of Ireland) Billy Coleman | Brendan Neville | Ford Escort RS1800 |
| 1981 | (England) Tony Pond | Ronan Morgan | Vauxhall Chevette HSR |
| 1982 | (England) Russell Brookes | Ronan Morgan | Vauxhall Chevette HSR |
| 1983 | (Republic of Ireland) Demi Fitzgerald | Leo Whyte | Vauxhall Chevette HSR |
| 1984 | (Republic of Ireland) Richie Heeley | Vincent Meade | Ford Escort RS1800 |
| 1985 | (Republic of Ireland) Richie Heeley | Vincent Meade | Ford Escort RS1800 |
| 1986 | (Republic of Ireland) Frank Meagher | Trevor Hughes | Ford Escort RS1800 |
| 1987 | No Rally - Insurance Crisis | | |
| 1988 | (Wales) Geoff Kitney | Alan McCann | Darrian T9 |
| 1989 | (Republic of Ireland) Bill Connolly | Tom Meaney | Opel Manta 400 |
| 1990 | (Republic of Ireland) Austin McHale | Ronan McNamee | BMW M3 |
| 1991 | (Republic of Ireland) Bill Connolly | Tom Meaney | BMW M3 |
| 1992 | (Wales) John Price | Mike Bowen | MG Metro 6R4 |
| 1993 | (Wales) John Price | Mike Bowen | MG Metro 6R4 |
| 1994 | (Republic of Ireland) Liam O'Callaghan | James O'Brien | Ford Sierra RS Cosworth 4x4 |
| 1995 | (Wales) Bob Fowden | Gerry Hynes | Ford Escort RS Cosworth |
| 1996 | (Republic of Ireland) Liam O'Callaghan | James O'Brien | Toyota Celica GT-Four ST205 |
| 1997 | (Wales) Bob Fowden | Gerry Hynes | Ford Escort RS Cosworth |
| 1998 | (Republic of Ireland) Donal O'Donovan | Pat Lordan | Ford Sierra RS Cosworth 4x4 |
| 1999 | (Wales) Bob Fowden | Gerry Hynes | Ford Escort RS Cosworth |
| 2000 | (Republic of Ireland) Stephen Murphy | Mickey Joe Morrissey | Subaru Impreza 555 |
| 2001 | No Rally - foot-and-mouth disease outbreak | | |
| 2002 | (Wales) Melvyn Evans | Aled Davies | Ford Escort WRC |
| 2003 | (Northern Ireland) Kenny McKinstry | Sean Mullally | Subaru Impreza WRC |
| 2004 | (Republic of Ireland) Donie O'Sullivan | Paul Nagle | Ford Focus WRC |
| 2005 | (Republic of Ireland) Denis Cronin | Helen O'Sullivan | Subaru Impreza WRC |
| 2006 | (Wales) Melvyn Evans | Sean Mullally | Subaru Impreza WRC |
| 2007 | (Republic of Ireland) Michael Barrable | Dermot O'Gorman | Ford Focus WRC |
| 2008 | (Republic of Ireland) Donie O'Sullivan | Paul Nagle | Subaru Impreza WRC |
| 2009 | (Republic of Ireland) Liam McCarthy | Kieran Murphy | Toyota Corolla WRC |
| 2010 | (Republic of Ireland) Tim McNulty | Paul Kiely | Subaru Impreza WRC |
| 2011 | (Republic of Ireland) Robert Barrable | Damien Connolly | Skoda Fabia S2000 |
| 2012 | (Republic of Ireland) Daragh O'Riordan | Tony McDaid | Subaru Impreza WRC |
| 2013 | (Republic of Ireland) Brian O'Mahony | John Higgins | Subaru Impreza WRC |
| 2014 | (Republic of Ireland) Donagh Kelly | Kevin Flanagan | Ford Focus WRC |
| 2015 | (Republic of Ireland) Donagh Kelly | Kevin Flanagan | Ford Focus WRC |
| 2016 | (Republic of Ireland) Donagh Kelly | Conor Foley | Ford Focus WRC |
| 2017 | (Republic of Ireland) Donagh Kelly | Conor Foley | Ford Focus WRC |
| 2018 | (Republic of Ireland) Donagh Kelly | Conor Foley | Ford Focus WRC |
| 2019 | (Republic of Ireland) Craig Breen | Paul Nagle | Ford Fiesta R5 |
| 2020 | Cancelled, coronavirus pandemic | | |
| 2021 | Cancelled, coronavirus pandemic | | |
| 2022 | (Republic of Ireland) Josh Moffett | Andy Hayes | Hyundai i20 R5 |
| 2023 | (Republic of Ireland) Josh Moffett | Andy Hayes | Hyundai i20 R5 |
| 2024 | (Republic of Ireland) Keith Cronin | Mikie Galvin | Ford Fiesta R5 |
| 2025 | (Republic of Ireland) Keith Cronin | Mikie Galvin | Citroën C3 Rally2 |
| 2026 | (Republic of Ireland) Josh Moffett | Andy Hayes | Toyota GR Yaris Rally2 |
