= Circuit of Ireland Rally =

Annual automobile rally in Ireland

- Category: Rally
- Inaugural season: 1931
- Drivers' champion: (Republic of Ireland) David Kelly
- Co-Drivers' champion: (Republic of Ireland) Shane Buckley

Irish Tarmac Rally Championship

European Rally Trophy

European Rally Championship (past)

Intercontinental Rally Challenge (past)

British Rally Championship (past) Northern Ireland Rally Championship (past)

Circuit of Ireland Rally
- Dates: Easter weekend
- Frequency: Annual
- Locations: Down, Londonderry, Tyrone, Donegal, Antrim
- Country: Northern Ireland; Republic of Ireland
- Most recent: 3rd-4th April 2026
- Organiser: Ulster Automobile Club; Cookstown Motor Club
- Sponsor: McKinney Competitions
- Website: Website

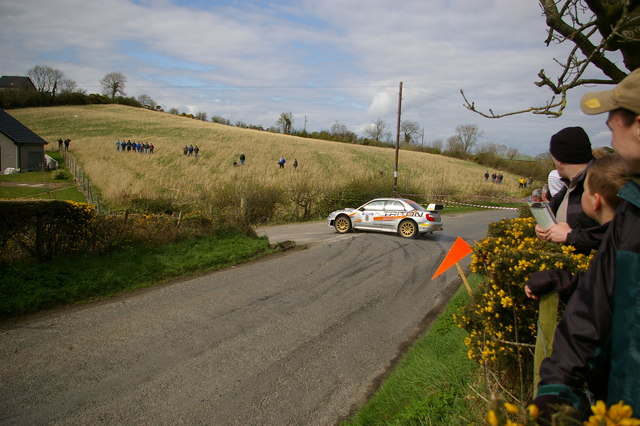
Ouley Hill Circuit of Ireland Rally 2009 - road junction Ouley/Gransha townland

The Circuit of Ireland International Rally is an annual automobile rally, which was first held in 1931 making it the third oldest rally in the world. The most recent event was held in 2025.

The Circuit, as it is colloquially known, is organised by the Ulster Automobile Club and is traditionally held over the Easter holiday weekend. It normally starts and finishes in Northern Ireland, although over time the lengthy route of the event has typically included large segments in the Republic of Ireland as well. Most of the event's special stages are laid out on paved public roads that are closed to other traffic.

== History ==
=== Early years ===
The rally originated in 1931 as the Ulster Motor Rally. It was run from multiple starting points, in a manner similar to the Monte Carlo Rally. After several years in this format, it transitioned into a 1089-mile circuit, essentially following the Irish coastline and starting and finishing in Bangor, County Down. The Circuit was suspended during World War II (1939–1945), and again in 1948 due to fuel shortages. Further cancellations occurred in 1957, 1972, 2001 and 2007.

=== 2007–2009 ===
The 2007 Circuit of Ireland was cancelled as a result of continuing disputes between the organisers, the event operating company, and the sponsors. It was replaced by a series of smaller Easter holiday events arranged by the Ulster Automobile Club. These included the Easter International Rally (or, Easter Stages Rally), which was run over 12 special stages in Londonderry, Tyrone, and Donegal.

The Circuit restarted again on the Easter weekend (21–23 March) in 2008. Twenty-eight teams competed on twenty special stages, with fourteen teams finishing. The overall winner was Eamonn Boland in a Subaru Impreza S12B.

The 2009 event was run over the weekend of 11–12 April, starting in the town of Banbridge, County Down and finishing after 14 special stages in Dundalk. The overall winner was Eugene Donnelly in a Škoda Fabia WRC.

=== 2010–2013 ===
In 2010, the event was awarded Intercontinental Rally Challenge Supporter Event status. The event was run over the weekend 3–4 April and was based in Newry, Northern Ireland. There was a total of 15 stages including a 29 kilometres (18 mi) night stage. The event counted as a round of the Irish Tarmac Rally Championship. Derek McGarrity and co-driver James McKee won the rally in their Subaru Impreza S12B. Gareth MacHale/Brian Murphy (Ford Focus RS WRC) and Alastair Fisher/Marshall Clarke (Mitsubishi Lancer Evo 9) finished second and third respectively.

The 2012 Circuit of Ireland event hosted round three of the 2012 Intercontinental Rally Challenge., as well as Irish Tarmac Rally Championship and Northern Ireland Rally Championship stages.

In December 2012, it was announced that the 2013 rally would be cancelled due to a lack of funds, but it was subsequently reinstated at a reduced scale. In the end, the event was cancelled due to bad weather.

=== 2014–2016 ===
Having resolved the issues the previous year, the 2014 Circuit of Ireland event rejoined the European Rally Championship for the first time since 1991. It consisted of 18 special stages covering a total of 230 km in 2 days, starting in Belfast. Finnish driver Esapekka Lappi dominated the (European Rally Championship) ahead of 2nd place Sepp Wiegand from Germany, making it a Skoda 1–2. He won by 1 minute and 50 seconds. Irishman Robert Barrable finished 3rd in their Ford Fiesta R5. Declan Boyle won the Circuit of Ireland National Rally in his Subaru Impreza S12B WRC. Teenage British driver Chris Ingram led the ERC Junior Championship but crashed out handing the win to Czech driver Jan Černý. Ingram still became the youngest winner of the Colin McRae 'Flat Out' Award, handed to him by local hero Kris Meeke.

The 2015 event hosted European Rally Championship and Irish Tarmac Rally Championship rounds.

The 2016 Circuit of Ireland event hosted European Rally Championship, Irish Tarmac Rally Championship, as well as British Rally Championship rounds.

=== 2017–2019 ===
The 2017 event was cancelled due to funding issues, casting doubt on the event's future altogether. For the following two years attempts to resurrect the event were unfruitful.

=== 2020–2021 ===
After a three-year break, the rally was finally about to return in 2020 to the Irish Tarmac Rally Championship calendar in tandem with the Easter Stages Rally. The event, managed by Event Director Graeme Stewart and Clerk of the Course Nigel Hughes, was planned to consist of 18 Special Stages. Overall distance of the event was going to be 377.46 mi (607.46 km), of which 137.25 mi (220.88 km) in special stages. The number of competitors was limited to 100, the competitor entry fee was £725. The event was also to host the European Rally Trophy series event FIA ERT Celtic Rally Trophy.

On 13 March the event was postponed in light of the coronavirus pandemic. On 20 March, Motorsport Ireland issued a statement that all motorsport events were suspended until 1 June 2020. On 28 April the Tarmac Rally Organisers' Association announced that the 2020 Irish Tarmac Rally Championship was cancelled. The Circuit of Ireland event could still go ahead, and the organisers – Ulster Automobile Club – promptly stated that the event had been postponed, rather than cancelled, and had secured a date in November. However, on 25 June 2020, they announced that in the interests of public health and safety, the event had been cancelled. 2021 event was also cancelled due to ongoing COVID-19 pandemic.

=== 2022 ===
After five years of absence, the Circuit returned to the 2022 racing calendar on Easter weekend. Officially called Wastewater Solutions Circuit of Ireland Rally 2022, it was hosted by Ulster Automobile Club and promoted by the Easter Stages Ltd. The two day, 192.68 competitive kilometres event ran over 12 stages in Mid and East Antrim, with event headquarters in the Livestock Market in Ballymena. The Circuit of Ireland International Rally was the first round of the FIA Celtic Rally Trophy and the third round of the Irish Tarmac Rally Championship.

=== 2023 ===
Following the successful running of the 2022 Circuit of Ireland, the rally returned in 2023. The single day event, hosted on 8 April 2023, saw eight stages based in Mid-Ulster. The 2023 Circuit was officially called "Milburn Concrete Circuit of Ireland Rally 2023" and was organised by the Cookstown Motor Club and the Ulster Automobile Club. In total, the 2023 circuit was 70 competitive miles long. The Circuit of Ireland presented as the third round of the Irish Tarmac Rally Championship.

=== Winners ===
Past winners
Year	Driver	Car
1931	Jimmy McCaherty	Austin 16 Saloon
1932	William McMullan	Alvis
1933	Stanley Orr	Austin 7
1934	Wilnor Jones	Standard 10
1935	Wesley Shaw	Triumph
1936	Basil Clarke	Austin 16
1937	Wesley Shaw	Triumph
1938	Graham Chambers	MG TA
1939	Billy Michael	Wolseley
1940– 1945	Cancelled; World War II	
1946	Artie Bell	Riley 12hp Sprite
1947	Jack McMichael	MG TC
1948	Cancelled; fuel shortages	
1949	Chris Lindsay	Ford Special
1950	Dermot Johnston	Allard
1953	Wilbert Todd	Dellow
1954	Mervyn Glover	Dellow
1955	Robin McKinney	Triumph TR2
1956	Robin McKinney	Triumph TR2
1957	Cancelled; Suez Crisis	
1958	Paddy Hopkirk	Triumph TR3A
1960	Adrian Boyd	Austin-Healey Sprite
1961	Paddy Hopkirk	Sunbeam Rapier
1962	Paddy Hopkirk	Mini Cooper
1963	Ian Woodside	Austin Sprite
1964	Ronnie McCartney	Mini Cooper S
1965	Paddy Hopkirk	Mini Cooper
1966	Tony Fall	Mini Cooper
1967	Paddy Hopkirk	Mini Cooper
1968	Roger Clark	Ford Escort
1969	Roger Clark	Ford Escort
1970	Roger Clark	Ford Escort
1971	Adrian Boyd	Ford Escort
1972	Cancelled; NI security concerns	
1973	Jack Tordoff	Porsche Carrera
1974	Cahal Curley	Porsche Carrera
1975	Billy Coleman	Ford Escort RS1600
1976	Billy Coleman	Ford Escort RS1800
1977	Russell Brookes	Ford Escort RS1800
1978	Russell Brookes	Ford Escort RS1800
1979	Pentti Airikkala	Vauxhall Chevette 2300 HSR
1980	Jimmy McRae	Vauxhall Chevette 2300 HSR
1981	Jimmy McRae	Opel Ascona 400
1982	Jimmy McRae	Opel Ascona 400
1983	Russell Brookes	Vauxhall Chevette 2300 HSR
1984	Billy Coleman	Opel Manta 400
1985	Jimmy McRae	Opel Manta 400
1986	David Llewellin	MG Metro 6R4
1987	Jimmy McRae	Ford Sierra RS Cosworth
1988	Jimmy McRae	Ford Sierra RS Cosworth
1989	Jimmy McRae	Ford Sierra RS Cosworth
1990	David Llewellin	Toyota Celica GT-Four
1991	Colin McRae	Subaru Legacy RS
1992	Frank Meagher	Ford Sierra RS Cosworth
1993	Austin MacHale	Toyota Celica
1994	Stephen Finlay	Ford Escort RS Cosworth
1995	Bertie Fisher	Subaru Impreza 555
1996	Stephen Finlay	Ford Escort RS Cosworth
1997	Bertie Fisher	Subaru Impreza
1998	Austin MacHale	Toyota Celica
1999	Bertie Fisher	Subaru Impreza
2000– 2001	Cancelled; 2001 United Kingdom foot-and-mouth outbreak	
2002	Andrew Nesbitt	Subaru Impreza
2003	Derek McGarrity	Subaru Impreza
2004	Derek McGarrity	Subaru Impreza
2005	Derek McGarrity	Subaru Impreza
2006	Eugene Donnelly	Toyota Corolla
2007	Mark Higgins	Subaru Impreza
2008	Eamon Boland	Subaru Impreza S12B
2009	Eugene Donnelly	Škoda Fabia WRC
2010	Derek McGarrity	Subaru Impreza S12B
2011	Derek McGarrity	Subaru Impreza S11
2012	Juho Hanninen	Škoda Fabia S2000
2013	Cancelled; bad weather	
2014	Esapekka Lappi	Škoda Fabia S2000
2015	Craig Breen	Peugeot 208 T16
2016	Craig Breen	Citroën DS3 R5
2017; 2018; 2019	Not held	
2020; 2021	Cancelled, coronavirus pandemic	
2022	Alastair Fisher	Volkswagen Polo GTI R5
2023	Callum Devine	Volkswagen Polo GTI R5
2024	Matt Edwards	Ford Fiesta Rally2
2025	Callum Devine	Skoda Fabia RS Rally2
2026	David Kelly	Skoda Fabia RS Rally2

=== Multiple winners ===
Top drivers with most wins (>2) and most starts (>15). (As of 2022)

Driver	Wins	Starts
Jimmy McRae	7	14
Paddy Hopkirk	5	8
Derek McGarrity	5	15
Roger Clark	3	12
Russell Brookes	3	16
Billy Coleman	3	18
Bertie Fisher	3	22
Adrian Boyd	2	17
Austin MacHale	2	25
Rosemary Smith	0	16
Noel Smith	0	16
