= Rally Ireland =

- Category: Rally
- Inaugural season: 2005
- Folded: 2009

World Rally Championship

Rally Ireland
- Frequency: Annual
- Country: Republic of Ireland; Northern Ireland
- Most recent: 2009
- Organiser: Motorsport Ireland

Rally Ireland was added to the FIA World Rally Championship (WRC) calendar in 2007. It was not part of the 2008 schedule, but returned as the First round of the championship in 2009. The north–south event is the largest sporting occasion on the island of Ireland with over 250,000 spectators and a TV audience in 180 countries. As part of the WRC rotation Rally Ireland is not part of the 2010 season but was expected to figure in 2011. However, on 19 February 2010 North One Sport the WRC promoter, announced that Rally Ireland would not be awarded a place on the 2011 calendar.

== Stage locations ==
The 2007 event took place between 15 and 18 November 2007, starting with the Super Special Stage in the grounds of the Stormont Parliament Buildings on the outskirts of Belfast, County Down.

The remainder of the event was based in the north-west of Ireland in the counties of Sligo, Fermanagh, Donegal, Leitrim, Tyrone, Roscommon and Cavan.

== Organisation structure ==
Rally Ireland is organised by Motorsport Ireland. The event itself joined the WRC in 2007 when it was won by reigning World Champions Sébastien Loeb and Daniel Elena in a Citroën C4. The rally is managed by Event Director John Naylor and the Clerk of the Course is Gordon Noble.

A steering committee which is charged with developing the event is in place. This committee is chaired by Austin Frazer and includes representative of Motorsport Ireland (MI) and The Association of Northern Ireland Car Clubs (ANICC).

Rally Ireland received strong government support from both sides of the border. It continues a long tradition of cross-border rallying in Ireland, which dates back to the early years of the Circuit of Ireland Rally in the 1930s.

== Surface ==
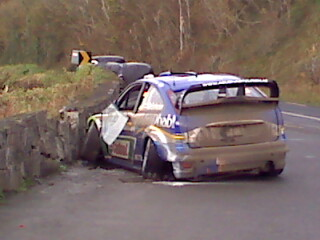
Marcus Grönholm crashes out at Lough Gill, County Sligo, 2007

The Rally was held on asphalt concrete, which was very wavy and slippery due to the humidly Irish weather, what makes this character being similar to the Rally Monte Carlo (with exception of snow). This character had even marked a high retirement-rate in this rally.

== Past winners ==
Year	Driver	Co-Driver	Car
2005	(United Kingdom) Matthew Wilson	(United Kingdom) Michael Orr	(United Kingdom) Ford Focus RS WRC
2006	(Republic of Ireland) Eugene Donnelly	(Republic of Ireland) Paul Kiely	(Japan) Toyota Corolla WRC
2007	(France) Sébastien Loeb	(Monaco) Daniel Elena	(France) Citroën C4 WRC
2009	(France) Sébastien Loeb	(Monaco) Daniel Elena	(France) Citroën C4 WRC

== See also ==
- West Cork Rally
