= Irish Tarmac Rally Championship =

Motorsport series

- Category: Rallying
- Country: Ireland / Northern Ireland
- Inaugural season: 1978
- Drivers' champion: (Republic of Ireland) Josh Moffett
- Official website: Website

The NAPA Auto Parts Irish Tarmac Rally Championship, or Irish Tarmac Rally Championship (ITRC) is the premier rallying series in Ireland. It is held annually and is promoted by the Tarmac Rally Organisers’ Association (TROA). The Championship takes place over seven events, based in the Republic of Ireland and in Northern Ireland, using special stages, which are run against the clock, on closed public tarmac roads.

The overall Championship title is contested by drivers and co-drivers using cars homologated in FIA classes RC2 (R5/ Rally2), RC3, RC4, RC5 and RG-T. Right Hand Drive Group R5 derivative cars, conforming to Group R5 specification as per Group R5 homologation papers (except for a right-hand drive conversion) can also be used.

Since 2016, WRC cars have not been eligible to score Championship points. However, competitors using WRC cars are able to win events outright.

Three other championships, the ITRC Junior Championship, the ITRC Historic Championship and the ITRC Modified Tarmac Championship, run in parallel with the ITRC, but with different regulations.

== History ==
The ITRC was created following the establishment of TROA in late 1977, when the organisers of the five Irish International rallies and the Manx International Rally came together with the idea of forming a championship. The inaugural Championship began in 1978 and consisted of six events: the Galway International Rally; Circuit of Ireland Rally; Donegal International Rally; Ulster Rally; Cork 20 International Rally; and the Manx International Rally.

The first major change to the series came in 1983, when the Rally of the Lakes attained International status and was installed as the final event in that year's championship. The addition of the Killarney-based round made up for the loss of the Galway International Rally, which did not run. The following year, the Galway International Rally returned and the Rally of the Lakes was retained, expanding the Championship to seven rounds from 1984 on.

The next significant change took place in 2002, when the Jim Clark Rally was added to the series, taking the Championship to eight rounds overall. The Jim Clark Rally was the first Scottish event to form part of the Championship, until it was dropped in 2010, along with the Manx International Rally, mainly due to a decline in the number of ITRC competitors entering both events.

The Championship reverted to seven rounds in 2015, when the West Cork Rally joined the ITRC as a full round, having previously been part the Modified Tarmac Championship calendar in 2014.

== Current Format and Event Calendar ==
The Irish Tarmac Championship consists of seven rounds:

- Galway International Rally
- West Cork Rally
- Easter Stages Rally
- Killarney Rally of the Lakes
- Donegal International Rally
- Ulster Rally
- Cork 20 International Rally

=== Previous Events ===
The following events have also been included in the Irish Tarmac Rally Championship in the past:

- Circuit of Ireland Rally
- Jim Clark Rally
- Manx International Rally
- Summit 2000 Rally - a one-off event, organised by Enniskillen Motor Club, that took place in May 2000, following the cancelation of three key rounds from that year's calendar. The Ulster Rally was undergoing organisational restructuring and was not part of the Championship; the Galway International Rally had suffered from adverse public relations after a series of incidents relating to anti-social behaviour and decided to sit the year out; while the Circuit of Ireland organisers faced a lack of entries and a date clash with the Rally of the Lakes and as a result cancelled the event.

== Points System ==
Competitors best scores in 6 out of 7 rounds are used to calculate the final Championship standings. Every driver and co-driver finishing each round in the top 10 are awarded championship points, with the winner receiving 21 points. Each finisher outside of the top 10 receives 1.5 points.

Position	1st	2nd	3rd	4th	5th	6th	7th	8th	9th	10th
Points	21	16	12	10	8	7	6	5	4	3

Each crew who enters and starts a respective event will be eligible for scoring 1 bonus point per event for starting an event.

For the 2026 season the final round of the championship will award points and a half

== 2026 Season ==
=== Calendar ===
Round	Dates	Event	Rally HQ	Organizer
1	31 January–1 February	Galway International Rally	Galway	Galway Motor Club
2	13–15 March	West Cork International Rally	Clonakilty	Cork Motor Club
3	3–4 April	Easter Stages / Circuit of Ireland Rally	Dungannon	Ulster Automobile Club
4	2–3 May	Killarney International Rally of the Lakes	Killarney	Killarney Motor Club
5	29–21 June	Donegal International Rally	Letterkenny	Donegal Motor Club
6	7–8 August	Ulster Rally	Ballymena	Northern Ireland Motor Club
7	26–27 September	Cork 20 International Rally	Macroom	Munster Motor Club

=== Season Summary ===
Results
Round	Winning driver	Winning co-driver	Winning car	Winning time	Ref.
1	Callum Devine	Noel O'Sullivan	Skoda Fabia RS Rally2	1:45:24.7	
2	Josh Moffett	Andy Hayes	Toyota GR Yaris Rally2	1:57:15.6	
3	David Kelly	Shane Buckley	Skoda Fabia RS Rally2	1:55:43.8	
4	Callum Devine	Noel O'Sullivan	Skoda Fabia RS Rally2	1:26:58.9	
5 (Note: Stages 13 to 20 were cancelled after a fatal crash involving a spectator during stage 12.) (Note: Overall winner was Kris Meeke in a time of 1:22:01.8)	Josh Moffett	Andy Hayes	Toyota GR Yaris Rally2	1:23:06.6	
6	Josh Moffett	Andy Hayes	Toyota GR Yaris Rally2	1:20:09.3	
7	Eddie Doherty	Tom Murphy	Skoda Fabia RS Rally2	1:53:49.6	

Notes

Drivers' Standings
Pos	Driver	1	2	3	4	5	6	7	Points	Best 6
1	Josh Moffett	13	22	17	11	22	22	25	132	121
2	Eddie Doherty	17	13	13	17	17	17	32.5	126.5	113.5
3	David Kelly	11	11	22	13	Ret		16	73	73
4	Callum Devine	22	17	9	22	Ret			71	71
5	Sam Touzel	5	9	11	3.5	8	13	10	59.5	56
6	Matthew Boyle	2.5	4		9	11		11	37.5	37.5
7	Eamonn Kelly	Ret			6	9		19	35	35
8	Mark Kelly		5		4	2.5	11	8	31.5	31.5
9	Keelan Grogan	6			5	7		13	31	31
10	Declan Boyle	9	8		7	2.5		Ret	27.5	27.5

== 2025 Season ==
The first round of the 2025 Irish Tarmac Rally Championship set to take place at the Galway International Rally was cancelled due to Storm Éowyn causing infrastructural damage along the rally route

Callum Devine won the 2025 championship, his 2nd in 3 seasons, after winning all 4 rounds in which he participated

Round	Dates	Event	Rally HQ	Organizer
	~~1–2 February~~ (Cancelled)	Galway International Rally	Galway	Galway Motor Club
1	14–16 March	West Cork International Rally	Clonakilty	Cork Motor Club
2	18–19 April	Easter Stages / Circuit of Ireland Rally	Dungannon	Ulster Automobile Club
3	3–4 May	Killarney International Rally of the Lakes	Killarney	Killarney Motor Club
4	20–22 June	Donegal International Rally	Letterkenny	Donegal Motor Club
5	15–16 August	Ulster Rally	Newry	Northern Ireland Motor Club
6	4–5 October	Cork 20 International Rally	Cork	Munster Motor Club

Results
Round	Driver	Co-driver	Car
1	Keith Cronin	Mikie Galvin	Citroën C3 Rally2
2	Callum Devine	Noel O'Sullivan	Skoda Fabia RS Rally2
3	Callum Devine	Noel O'Sullivan	Skoda Fabia RS Rally2
4	Callum Devine	Noel O'Sullivan	Skoda Fabia RS Rally2
5	Callum Devine	Noel O'Sullivan	Skoda Fabia RS Rally2
6	Michael Boyle	Dermot McCafferty	Skoda Fabia RS Rally2

Drivers Championship
Position	Driver	Car	Overall Points	Final Points
1	Callum Devine	Skoda Fabia RS Rally2	88	88
2	Declan Boyle	Škoda Fabia RS Rally2	74	66
3	Michael Boyle	Volkswagen Polo GTI R5; Škoda Fabia RS Rally2	60	60
4	David Kelly	Volkswagen Polo GTI R5	46	46
5	Kevin Eves	Ford Fiesta Rally2	36	36

== 2024 Season ==
Round	Dates	Event	Rally HQ	Organizer
1	3–4 February	Galway International Rally	Galway	Galway Motor Club
2	15–17 March	West Cork International Rally	Clonakilty	Cork Motor Club
3	30 April	Easter Stages / Circuit of Ireland Rally	Dungannon	Ulster Automobile Club
4	4–5 May	Killarney International Rally of the Lakes	Killarney	Killarney Motor Club
5	21–23 June	Donegal International Rally	Letterkenny	Donegal Motor Club
6	17 August	Ulster Rally	Newry	Northern Ireland Motor Club
7	29 September	Cork 20 International Rally	Cork	Munster Motor Club

Results
Round	Driver	Co-driver	Car
1	Keith Cronin	Mikie Galvin	Ford Fiesta Rally2
2	Keith Cronin	Mikie Galvin	Ford Fiesta Rally2
3	Matt Edwards	David Moynihan	Ford Fiesta Rally2
4	Callum Devine	Noel O'Sullivan	Volkswagen Polo GTI R5
5	Callum Devine	Noel O'Sullivan	Škoda Fabia RS Rally2
6	Keith Cronin	Mikie Galvin	Ford Fiesta Rally2
7	Callum Devine	Noel O'Sullivan	Škoda Fabia RS Rally2

Drivers Championship
Position	Driver	Car	Overall Points	Final Points
1	Keith Cronin	Ford Fiesta Rally2	112	100
2	Callum Devine	Volkswagen Polo GTI R5; Škoda Fabia RS Rally2	102	100
3	Matt Edwards	Ford Fiesta Rally2	85.5	82
4	Josh Moffett	Citroën C3 Rally2	63	63
5	David Kelly	Volkswagen Polo GTI R5	44	44

== 2023 Season ==
Round	Dates	Event	Rally HQ	Organizer
1	4–5 February	Galway International Rally	Galway	Galway Motor Club
2	18–19 March	West Cork International Rally	Clonakilty	Cork Motor Club
3	8 April	Easter Stages / Circuit of Ireland Rally	Cookstown	Ulster Automobile Club
4	29–30 April	Killarney International Rally of the Lakes	Killarney	Killarney Motor Club
5	16–18 June	Donegal International Rally	Letterkenny	Donegal Motor Club
6	5–6 August	Cork 20 International Rally	Cork	Munster Motor Club
7	18–19 August	Ulster Rally	Newry	Northern Ireland Motor Club

Results
Round	Driver	Co-driver	Car
1	Meirion Evans	Johnathan Jackson	Volkswagen Polo GTI R5
2	Josh Moffett	Andy Hayes	Hyundai i20 R5
3	Callum Devine	Noel O'Sullivan	Volkswagen Polo GTI R5
4	Callum Devine	Noel O'Sullivan	Volkswagen Polo GTI R5
5	Callum Devine	Noel O'Sullivan	Volkswagen Polo GTI R5
6	Callum Devine	Noel O'Sullivan	Volkswagen Polo GTI R5
7	Callum Devine	Noel O'Sullivan	Volkswagen Polo GTI R5

Drivers Championship
Position	Driver	Car	Points
1	Callum Devine	Volkswagen Polo GTI R5	117
2	Josh Moffett	Hyundai i20 N Rally2	86
3	Meirion Evans	Volkswagen Polo GTI R5	83
4	Robert Barrable	Citroën C3 Rally2	76
5	Jonny Greer	Volkswagen Polo GTI R5	69

== 2022 Season ==
In July 2021, TROA released a statement regarding their intention to run a full championship in 2022.

Killarney & District Motor Club announced that the Killarney Historic Rally will take place on 27 November 2021. This rally will count as the opening round of the ITRC Historic Championship.

With COVID-19 restrictions effectively coming to an end, a full 2022 calendar was announced by Motorsport Ireland and TROA.

Round	Dates	Event	Rally HQ	Organizer
1	5–6 February	Galway International Rally	Galway	Galway Motor Club
2	19–20 March	West Cork International Rally	Clonakilty	Cork Motor Club
3	15–16 April	Easter Stages / Circuit of Ireland Rally	Dundrod	Ulster Automobile Club
4	30 April–1 May	Killarney International Rally of the Lakes	Killarney	Killarney Motor Club
5	17–19 June	Donegal International Rally	Letterkenny	Donegal Motor Club
6	30–31 July	Cork 20 International Rally	Cork	Munster Motor Club
7	19–20 August	Ulster International Rally	Newry	Northern Ireland Motor Club
8	26 November	Killarney Historic Rally	Killarney	Killarney & District Motor Club

Results
Round	Driver	Co-driver	Car
1	Josh Moffett	Andy Hayes	Hyundai i20 R5
2	Josh Moffett	Andy Hayes	Hyundai i20 R5
3	Alastair Fisher	Gordon Noble	Volkswagen Polo GTI R5
4	Callum Devine	Noel O'Sullivan	Volkswagen Polo GTI R5
5	Josh Moffett	Andy Hayes	Hyundai i20 R5

== 2021 Season ==
In February 2021, the TROA decided to cancel the 2021 Championship. Northern Ireland and the Republic of Ireland were still subject to restrictions designed to curb the impact of the COVID-19 pandemic and the TROA announcement cited the uncertainty surrounding the running of championship events during 2021. At the point the decision was taken to cancel the Championship, the opening three rounds of the Championship had already been called off.

== 2020 Season ==
The 2020 season commenced with the opening round in Galway in February 2020. The West Cork Rally was cancelled on 12 March 2020, due to the global COVID-19 outbreak. On 20 March, Motorsport Ireland issued a statement that all motorsport events were suspended until 1 June 2020, which led to the postponement of the following rounds. Amidst on-going restrictions aimed at curbing the effects of the pandemic, the board of directors and executive of TROA made the unanimous decision to cancel the 2020 Championship on 28 April 2020.

2020 event calendar before cancellation
Round	Dates	Event	Rally HQ	Organizer	Status
1	2 February	Galway International Rally	Galway	Galway Motor Club	Ok
2	14–15 March	West Cork International Rally	Clonakilty	Cork Motor Club	Cancelled
3	10–11 April	Easter Stages / Circuit of Ireland Rally	Dundrod	Ulster Automobile Club	Cancelled
4	2–3 May	International Rally of the Lakes	Killarney	Killarney Motor Club	Cancelled
5	19–21 June	Donegal International Rally	Letterkenny	Donegal Motor Club	Cancelled
6	21–22 August	Ulster International Rally	Newry	Northern Ireland Motor Club	Cancelled
7	26–27 September	Cork 20 International Rally	Cork	Munster Motor Club	Cancelled

== 2019 Season ==
Galway International Rally returned to the calendar in 2019, following the cancellation of the 2018 event. The Easter Stages Rally replaced the Circuit of Ireland Rally event for the third year in a row.

The overall champion was Craig Breen, co-driven by Paul Nagle, after winning five rounds.

Round	Dates	Event	Rally HQ	Organizer
1	10 February	Galway International Rally	Galway	Galway Motor Club
2	16–17 March	West Cork Rally	Clonakilty	Cork Motor Club
3	2 June	Easter Stages Rally	Dundrod	Ulster Automobile Club
4	4–5 May	Rally of the Lakes	Killarney	Killarney Motor Club
5	21–23 June	Donegal International Rally	Letterkenny	Donegal Motor Club
6	16–17 August	Ulster Rally	Newry	Northern Ireland Motor Club
7	28–29 September	Cork 20 Rally	Cork	Munster Motor Club

Top 10 ITRC drivers overall:

Pos	Driver	Car	1	2	3	4	5	6	7	Points
1	Craig Breen	Ford Fiesta R5; Hyundai i20 R5	17	17	17	17	0	17	0	85
2	Alastair Fisher	Ford Fiesta R5	14	14	8	14	12	10	0	72
3	Callum Devine	Ford Fiesta R5	0	8	10	12	17	14	0	61
4	Meirion Evans	Hyundai i20 R5; Škoda Fabia R5	1.5	1.5	1.5	1.5	10	12	25.5	52
5	Jonathan Greer	Ford Fiesta R5	7	1.5	12	DNF	0	DNF	21	41.5
6	Josh Moffett	Ford Fiesta R5; Hyundai i20 R5	12	7	1.5	DNF	14	DNF	0	34.5
7	Desi Henry	Škoda Fabia R5; Ford Fiesta R5	8	DNF	14	10	0	0	0	32
8	Martyn England	Ford Fiesta R5	0	DNF	1.5	0	0	0	18	19.5
9	Sam Moffett	Ford Fiesta R5	DNF	10	7	DNF	0	0	0	17
10	Keith Lyons	Ford Fiesta R5	1.5	DNF	0	DNF	0	0	15	16.5

== Irish Tarmac Rally Champions ==
Season	Driver	Co-driver	Car
1978	(Scotland) John Taylor	John Jensen	Ford Escort RS1800
1979	(Northern Ireland) Brian Nelson	Rodney Cole	Ford Escort RS1800
1980	(Scotland) Jimmy McRae	Frank Main	Vauxhall Chevette HSR
1981	(Scotland) Jimmy McRae	Ian Grindrod	Opel Ascona 400
1982	(Republic of Ireland) John Coyne	Christy Farrell	Lotus Sunbeam
1983	(Republic of Ireland) Austin McHale	Christy Farrell	Vauxhall Chevette HSR
1984	(Republic of Ireland) Billy Coleman	Ronan Morgan	Opel Manta 400
1985	(Republic of Ireland) Austin McHale	Christy Farrell	Opel Manta 400
1986	(Republic of Ireland) Austin McHale	Christy Farrell	Opel Manta 400
1987	(England) Mark Lovell	Roger Freeman	Ford Sierra Cosworth
1988	(England) Mark Lovell	Terry Harryman	Ford Sierra Cosworth
1989	(England) Russell Brookes	Diekman/Wilson/Brown	Ford Sierra Cosworth
1990	(Northern Ireland) Bertie Fisher	Rory Kennedy	BMW M3
1991	(Northern Ireland) Kenny McKinstry	Robbie Philpott	Ford Sierra Cosworth
1992	(Northern Ireland) Bertie Fisher	Rory Kennedy	Subaru Legacy RS
1993	(Northern Ireland) Bertie Fisher	Rory Kennedy	Subaru Legacy RS
1994	(Northern Ireland) Kenny McKinstry	Robbie Philpott	Subaru Legacy RS
1995	(Republic of Ireland) Frank Meagher	Pat Moloughney	Ford Escort RS Cosworth
1996	(Northern Ireland) Bertie Fisher	Rory Kennedy	Subaru Impreza 555
1997	(Republic of Ireland) Austin McHale	Brian Murphy	Toyota Celica GT-Four ST185
1998	(Republic of Ireland) Austin McHale	Brian Murphy	Toyota Celica GT-Four ST185
1999	(Northern Ireland) Ian Greer	Dean Beckett	Toyota Celica GT-Four ST205
2000	(Northern Ireland) Andrew Nesbitt	James O'Brien	Subaru Impreza S5 WRC 99
2001	Cancelled due to foot-and-mouth disease outbreak		
2002	(Northern Ireland) Andrew Nesbitt	James O'Brien	Subaru Impreza S6 WRC 2000
2003	(Northern Ireland) Derek McGarrity	Dermot O'Gorman	Subaru Impreza S8 WRC 2002
2004	(Northern Ireland) Derek McGarrity	Dermot O'Gorman	Subaru Impreza S9 WRC 2003
2004	(Northern Ireland) Eugene Donnelly	Paul Kiely	Toyota Corolla WRC
2005	(Northern Ireland) Eugene Donnelly	Paul Kiely	Toyota Corolla WRC
2006	(Northern Ireland) Eugene Donnelly	Paul Kiely	Toyota Corolla WRC
2007	(Northern Ireland) Eugene Donnelly	Paul Kiely	Subaru Impreza S12 WRC 2006
2008	(Republic of Ireland) Eamonn Boland	Damien Morrisey	Subaru Impreza S12B WRC 2007
2009	(Northern Ireland) Eugene Donnelly	Paddy Toner	Škoda Fabia WRC
2010	(Republic of Ireland) Gareth MacHale	Brian Murphy	Ford Focus RS WRC 06
2011	(Republic of Ireland) Tim McNulty	Paul Kiely	Subaru Impreza S12B WRC 2007
2012	(Northern Ireland) Darren Gass	Enda Sherry	Subaru Impreza S10 WRC 2004
2013	(Northern Ireland) Garry Jennings	Kevin Flanagan (co-driving for Donagh Kelly)	Subaru Impreza S12B WRC '07
2014	(Republic of Ireland) Declan Boyle	Brian Boyle	Subaru Impreza S12B WRC
2015	(Republic of Ireland) Donagh Kelly	Ciaran Geaney (co-driving for Joe McGonigle)	Ford Focus WRC
2016	(Republic of Ireland) Keith Cronin	Mikie Galvin	Citroën DS3 R5 2016
2017	(Republic of Ireland) Sam Moffett	Karl Atkinson	Ford Fiesta R5
2018	(Republic of Ireland) Josh Moffett	Andy Hayes	Ford Fiesta R5
2019	(Republic of Ireland) Craig Breen	Paul Nagle	Ford Fiesta R5
2020	Cancelled due to the COVID-19 pandemic		
2021	Cancelled due to the COVID-19 pandemic		
2022	(Republic of Ireland) Josh Moffett	Andy Hayes	Hyundai i20 R5
2023	(Republic of Ireland) Callum Devine	Noel O’Sullivan	Volkswagen Polo GTI R5
2024	(Republic of Ireland) Keith Cronin	Mikie Galvin	Ford Fiesta R5
2025	(Republic of Ireland) Callum Devine	Patrick Walsh (co-driving for Declan Boyle)	Skoda Fabia RS Rally2
2026	(Republic of Ireland) Josh Moffett	Andy Hayes	Toyota GR Yaris Rally2

== Broadcasting ==
Coverage of championship is provided by Onthepacenote who are live from every round of the championship, and edited highlights are available on the RallyTV YouTube channel filmed by Flyin Finn Motorsport Videos & Mad4Tar Motorsport Videos and edited by Special Stage TV

TG4 coverage is by "On the Limit Sport" produced by Mick Bracken with presentation by John Kenny
