= Rally of the Lakes =

Motorsport event held in Ireland

- Category: Rally
- Inaugural season: 1979
- Drivers' champion: (Republic of Ireland) Callum Devine
- Co-Drivers' champion: (Republic of Ireland) Noel O'Sullivan

Irish Tarmac Rally Championship

Rally of the Lakes
- Dates: May 1, 2026 - May 3, 2026
- Frequency: Annual
- Location: County Kerry
- Country: Ireland
- Most recent: 2026
- Organiser: Killarney and District Motor Club
- Sponsor: Assess Ireland; Gleneagle Hotel
- Website: rallyofthelakes.com

The Rally of the Lakes, known as the Assess Ireland International Rally of the Lakes, is an on-road rallying event held in the south-west of Republic of Ireland. It takes place each year on May bank holiday weekend. Organised by Killarney and District Motor Club, the rally has been running since 1979. Traditionally, it starts in Killarney and runs across County Kerry. For a number of years it has been the third/fourth round of the Irish Tarmac Rally Championship. The Killarney and District Motor Club also organises the Killarney Historic Rally. This takes place each year at the end of November.

== History ==
=== 2020-2021 ===
The event was planned to take place on 2–3 May 2020. On 12 March, all motorsport events were postponed in the light of the coronavirus pandemic. On 20 March, Motorsport Ireland issued a statement that all motorsport events were suspended until 1 June 2020. On 28 April, the Tarmac Rally Organisers' Association announced that the 2020 Irish Tarmac Rally Championship is cancelled. The event can still go ahead anyway, but will not be a counting round of the ITRC. No further announcements came from the club, the event did not take place. Due to ongoing COVID-19 pandemic, the 2021 event was also cancelled.

== Previous winners ==
Year	Driver	Co-Driver	Car
1979	(Republic of Ireland) Billy Coleman	Brendan Neville	Ford Escort RS
1980	(Republic of Ireland) Ger Buckley	John Caplice	Vauxhall Chevette HSR
1981	(Republic of Ireland) Demi Fitzgerald	Leo Whyte	Vauxhall Chevette HSR
1982	(Republic of Ireland) James Doherty	Michael Curley	Vauxhall Chevette HSR
1983	(Republic of Ireland) Billy Coleman	Con Murphy	Opel Ascona 400
1984	(Republic of Ireland) Billy Coleman	Ronan Morgan	Opel Manta 400
1985	(Republic of Ireland) Billy Coleman	Ronan Morgan	Ford Escort G3
1986	(Republic of Ireland) Austin McHale	Christy Farrell	Opel Manta 400
1987	(United Kingdom) Mark Lovell	Roger Freeman	Ford Sierra RS Cosworth
1988	(Republic of Ireland) Austin McHale	Ronan McNamee	Opel Manta 400
1989	(United Kingdom) Russell Brookes	John Brown	Ford Sierra RS Cosworth
1990	(United Kingdom) Bertie Fisher	Rory Kennedy	BMW M3
1991	(United Kingdom) Bertie Fisher	Rory Kennedy	Ford Sierra Sapphire Cosworth 4x4
1992	(United Kingdom) Bertie Fisher	Rory Kennedy	Subaru Legacy RS
1993	(United Kingdom) Bertie Fisher	Rory Kennedy	Subaru Legacy RS
1994	(United Kingdom) Bertie Fisher	Rory Kennedy	Subaru Impreza 555
1995	(Republic of Ireland) Frank Meagher	Pat Moloughney	Ford Escort RS Cosworth
1996	(United Kingdom) Bertie Fisher	Rory Kennedy	Subaru Impreza 555
1997	(Republic of Ireland) Austin McHale	Brian Murphy	Toyota Celica 4WD Turbo ST185
1998	(United Kingdom) James Leckey	George Millar	Subaru Impreza 555
1999	(United Kingdom) Ian Greer	Dean Beckett	Toyota Celica GT-Four ST205
2000	(Republic of Ireland) Stephen Finlay	Rory Kennedy	Ford Focus WRC
2001	No Rally - Foot-and-mouth disease outbreak		
2002	(Republic of Ireland) Andrew Nesbitt	James O'Brien	Subaru Impreza WRC
2003	(Republic of Ireland) Eugene Donnelly	Paul Kiely	Subaru Impreza WRC
2004	(Republic of Ireland) Derek McGarrity	Dermot O'Gorman	Subaru Impreza
2005	(Republic of Ireland) Andrew Nesbitt	James O'Brien	Subaru Impreza
2006	(Republic of Ireland) Tim McNulty	Anthony Nestor	Subaru Impreza WRC
2007	(Republic of Ireland) Kris Meeke	Jonas Andersson	Subaru Impreza WRC
2008	(Republic of Ireland) Eamonn Boland	Damien Morrisey	Subaru Impreza WRC
2009	(Republic of Ireland) Tim McNulty	David Moynihan	Subaru Impreza WRC S12
2010	(Republic of Ireland) Denis Cronin	Helen O'Sullivan	Subaru Impreza
2011	(Republic of Ireland) Daragh O'Riordan	Tony McDaid	Subaru Impreza WRC S12
2012	(Republic of Ireland) Daragh O'Riordan	Tony McDaid	Subaru Impreza WRC S12
2013	(Republic of Ireland) Garry Jennings	Neil Doherty	Subaru Impreza WRC S12B
2014	(Republic of Ireland) Sam Moffett	James O'Reilly	Ford Fiesta WRC
2017	(Republic of Ireland) Conor Murphy	Damien Fleming	Honda Civic WRC
2018	(Republic of Ireland) Manus Kelly	David Gleeson	BMW E30
2019	(Republic of Ireland) Craig Breen	Paul Nagle	Ford Fiesta R5
2020	Cancelled, COVID-19 pandemic		
2021	Cancelled, COVID-19 pandemic		
2022	(Republic of Ireland) Callum Devine	Noel O'Sullivan	VW Polo GTI R5
2023	(Republic of Ireland) Callum Devine	Noel O'Sullivan	VW Polo GTI R5
2024	(Republic of Ireland) Callum Devine	Noel O'Sullivan	VW Polo GTI R5
2025	(Republic of Ireland) Callum Devine	Noel O'Sullivan	Skoda Fabia RS Rally2
2026	(Republic of Ireland) Callum Devine	Noel O'Sullivan	Skoda Fabia RS Rally2

== Partners and sponsors ==
- Killarney and District Motor Club
- The Gleneagle Hotel, Killarney
- Ordnance Survey Ireland
- Rentokill Initial
- Aherns.ie Motor Group
