= Tim McNulty (rally driver) =

Irish rally driver

Tim McNulty (born 1966) of County Meath, Ireland is a rally driver.

Rallying in his Subaru Impreza S12B WRC, McNulty in the same 2011 season won both the Irish Tarmac Rally Championship and Ireland’s Dunlop National Rally in a historic motorsports first.

In anticipation of the Todd’s Leap Ulster Rally earlier in the season, fellow rally driver Derek McGarrity stated of McNulty that: “Tim is always a hard man to beat, very competitive and very committed, and he should have a slight advantage with his S12 Subaru which has the edge in power over the S11 I’m driving this time.”

== Rally record ==
According to his eWRC-results.com profile, McNulty drove his first rally in 1995, driving a Vauxhall Nova at the Circuit of Ireland.

In 2000, McNulty saw success in the Irish National Rally Championship, finishing the championship in third in the standings after taking several podiums. It was in 2011 however that he had his best result in the championship, taking the title in a Subaru Impreza S12B WRC '07 with 6 wins, 120 points and 40 stage wins.

In 2004, McNulty finished 4th in the Tarmac Championship, driving a Subaru Impreza WRC, and finished as runner-up the following year in 2005. It was in 2011 that he took the overall Tarmac Championship title, driving a Subaru Impreza WRC. That year, he won at the Galway International Rally, the Donegal International Rally and the Ulster International Rally and taking a 2nd place at the Cork 20 Rally.

From 2010 to 2011, (the latter being the year when he won both the Ireland National title and the Irish Tarmac Rally Championship title), McNulty did not finish any events below second place in any rally he finished across the two championships. In this time period, McNulty took 12 wins: 4 in the Tarmac Championship, and 8 in the National Championship.

From 2001 to 2012, McNulty drove Subaru Imprezas, as did many of the Irish rally drivers of that time; between 2000 and 2015, 10 of the Tarmac Championship titles were taken in Subaru Impreza WRCs. Later in his career, McNulty switched from Subaru Impreza WRCs to a Ford Fiesta Rally2, a Volkswagen Polo GTI R5, and a Skoda Fabia RS Rally2.

== See also ==
- Rally of the Lakes
- Eugene Donnelly
- Cork 20 Rally
- 2007 Rally Ireland
- Donegal International Rally
