= The Motorsport Ireland Show =

- Country of origin: Ireland
- No. of seasons: 3

Production
- Running time: 30 minutes

Original release
- Network: TG4
- Release: January 2012

The Motorsport Ireland Show is a television program showing highlights of the latest Irish motorsport on TG4, a public service television channel in the Republic of Ireland. It was usually broadcast weekly on Wednesday from 11:00 pm to 11:30 pm. It was then repeated on Saturday morning from 10:35 am to 11:05 am. It ran throughout the motorsport season in Ireland, showing highlights of the Dunlop National Rally Championship, the Irish Tarmac Championship and the Valvoline National Forestry Championship along with other areas of Irish motorsport. The show was developed in partnership with Motorsport Ireland, the motorsports governing organisation in the Republic of Ireland.
