= Rally Isle of Man =

Rally Isle of Man
Country	Isle of Man
- Date
Type	Stage Rally/Asphalt
Clerk of the Course	Alan Teare (National A - formerly an International event)
Event Organiser	Rally Isle of Man Ltd
Principal Sponsor	Microgaming Software Systems Ltd

History
First Event	1963 Manx Trophy Rally
Number of events	50 (2014)
First winner	Reg McBride/Don Barrow (1963)
Most wins	Mark Higgins 5 (1989–2009)

Rally Isle of Man (previously the Manx International Rally and formerly the Manx Trophy Rally) is a car rally competition held in the Isle of Man. It was first held in 1963, and later became a well-known event in the British Open Rally Championship and the European Rally Championship (until 1996). In 2002, it became part of the Irish Tarmac Rally Championship in addition to the British Rally Championship. The most successful drivers in the history of the rally include the five-time winner Mark Higgins and the four-time winners Tony Pond and Russell Brookes.

This has been an annual event for many years, apart from cancellation in 2011. In early September 2018, it was announced that the 2018 event had been cancelled. Various allegations were made, blaming the cancellation on, inter alia, the rally organisers, the Department of Infrastructure and the Department for Enterprise. The event returned in 2022 as part of the FIA Celtic Rally Trophy.

== Stage locations ==
Rally Isle of Man is run on public roads closed for racing by the provisions of an Act of Tynwald (the parliament of the Isle of Man). The event has special timed stages that use narrow farm-lanes with high grass banks, stages over open moorland and Monaco-style 'around-the-houses' stages in Ramsey or Castletown. The exact routes vary each year, but in 2008 the longest timed special stage was the 21.46-mile (34.54 km) Milerisk stage and the shortest included the 1.46-mile (2.35 km) Balley Cashtal stage in Castletown and the 0.90-mile (1.45 km) Villa Marina "super-special" stage in Douglas.

== Special stage records ==
Records and stage times for competition sections for the Manx International Rally and Rally Isle of Man
Name	Route	Year	Driver	Type	Length	Time	Average speed
Balley Cashtal	Castletown	2006	(Norway) Andreas Mikkelsen	Ford Focus RS WRC 05	1.26 miles (2.03 km)	1' 17.00	58.90 miles per hour (94.79 km/h)
Castle Rushen	Castletown - Balladoole - Poyll Vaaish - Strandhall - Kentraugh Mill	2016	(United Kingdom) Desi Henry	Škoda Fabia R5	5.08 miles (8.18 km)	4' 19.9	70.36 miles per hour (113.23 km/h)
Classic	Ballaugh Glen – Druidale – Brandywell Cottage – Injebreck – Baldwin Valley – TT Grandstand	2008	(Republic of Ireland) Eamonn Boland	Subaru Impreza WRC S12	13.27 miles (21.36 km)	11' 30.5	71.16 miles per hour (114.52 km/h)
Cringle	Ballabeg – Round Table – Glen Rushen Mines – St. Johns	2004	(Isle of Man) Mark Higgins	Škoda Octavia WRC	13.66 miles (21.98 km)	11' 06.2	74.73 miles per hour (120.27 km/h)
Glascoe	Dog Mills – Andreas – Jurby East – Sandygate – St Judes	2009	(Republic of Ireland) Keith Cronin	Mitsubishi Lancer Evo	12.47 miles (20.07 km)	10' 08.8	73.74 miles per hour (118.67 km/h)
Glen Roy	Begoade Road – Conrhenny – 5½ Mile Corner – Social Cottage – Baldhoon	2007	(Norway) Andreas Mikkelsen	Ford Focus RS WRC 05	4.66 miles (7.50 km)	4' 10.7	66.91 miles per hour (107.68 km/h)
Kella	West Kella – The Curraghs – Ballaugh Cronk – Orrisdale	2007	(Norway) Andreas Mikkelsen	Ford Focus RS WRC 05	11.21 miles (18.04 km)	9' 23.1	71.66 miles per hour (115.33 km/h)
Marine	Douglas Head – Port Soderick – Crogga – Santon	2008	(Republic of Ireland) Eamonn Boland	Subaru Impreza WRC S12	3.30 miles (5.31 km)	4' 23.8	66.09 miles per hour (106.36 km/h)
Maughold	Hibernia – Ballajora – Slieau Lewaigue	1991	(France) François Chatriot	Subaru Legacy RS	3.30 miles (5.31 km)	2' 50.0	66.33 miles per hour (106.75 km/h)
Newtown (Milerisk)	Santon – The Braaid – Foxdale – Loobs Road – St. Marks – The Gate	2006	(Finland) Tapio Laukkanen	Renault Mégane Maxi	21.38 miles (34.41 km)	17' 20.00	74.28 miles per hour (119.54 km/h)
Ravensdale	Druidale – Brandywell Cottage – Sartfield Hairpin – Little London	1989	(United Kingdom) Jimmy McRae	Ford Sierra RS Cosworth	7.14 miles (11.49 km)	6' 08.0	68.08 miles per hour (109.56 km/h)
Sand Quarry	German Parish: Ballagyr – (Loop Section; Lynague – Ballakaighen – Staarvey – The Kew – East Lhergydoo) – Ballagyr Lane	2017	(Sweden) Fredrik Ahlin	Škoda Fabia R5	13.23 miles (21.29 km)	10' 37.8	74.74 miles per hour (120.28 km/h)
Staarvey	German Parish: Stockfield – Lynague – Ballagyr – East Lhergydhoo – Staarvey Road – Ballakaighen	2009	(Isle of Man) Mark Higgins	Subaru Impreza WRX STI	7.22 miles (11.62 km)	6' 12.0	68.97 miles per hour (111.00 km/h)
Tholt-e-Will	Sulby Claddaghs – Sulby Glen – Tholt-e-Will Glen	1999	(United Kingdom) Martin Rowe	Renault Mégane Maxi	4.14 miles (6.66 km)	3' 36.3	68.97 miles per hour (111.00 km/h)
Villa Marina (Super-Special)	Douglas: Harris Promenade – Broadway – Villa Marina – Gaiety Chicane – Loch Promenade – Senna Slip Hairpin – Greensills Corner – Sefton Chicane – Villa Marina – Broadway	2016	(Republic of Ireland) Craig Breen	Citroën DS3 R5	0.90 miles (1.45 km)	1' 02.8	51.62 miles per hour (83.07 km/h)
West Baldwin	Little London – Brandywell Cottage – Injebreck – Ballaoates – Abbeylands – Cronk-ny-Mona	1992	(United Kingdom) Colin McRae	Subaru Legacy RS	11.65 miles (18.75 km)	9' 21.0	74.82 miles per hour (120.41 km/h)

== Winners ==
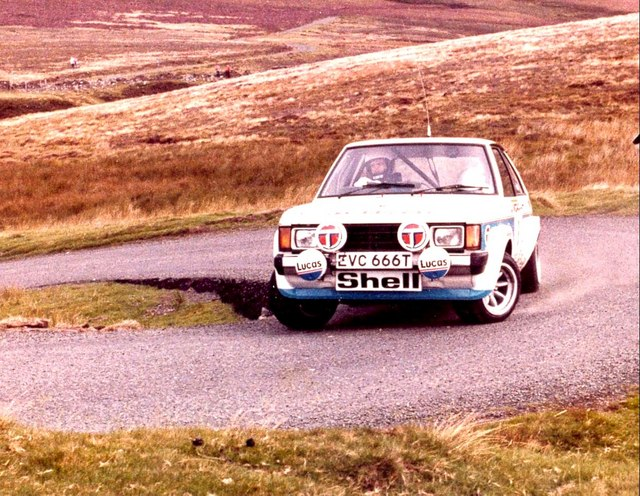
Tony Pond at the 1979 rally

Season	Driver	Co-driver	Car
1963	(United Kingdom) Reg McBride	(United Kingdom) Don Barrow	Allardette
1964	(United Kingdom) Dave Friswell	(United Kingdom) Keith Binns	Mini Cooper S
1965	(United Kingdom) Tony Fall	(United Kingdom) Dave Fawcett	Mini Cooper S
1966	(United Kingdom) Dennis Easthorpe	(United Kingdom) Dennis Craine	Ford Cortina GT
1967	(United Kingdom) Norman Harvey	(United Kingdom) Terry Vaux	Mini Cooper S
1968	(United Kingdom) John Huyton	(United Kingdom) Bob Corrin	Ford Cortina GT
1969	(United Kingdom) Colin Malkin	(United Kingdom) John Davenport	Hillman Imp
1970	(United Kingdom) Chris Sclater	(United Kingdom) John Davenport	Ford Escort TC
1971	(United Kingdom) Roger Clark	(United Kingdom) Henry Liddon	Ford Escort RS1600
1972	(United Kingdom) Roger Clark	(United Kingdom) Jim Porter	Ford Escort RS1600
1973	(Republic of Ireland) Adrian Boyd	(United Kingdom) John Davenport	Ford Escort RS1600
1974	(United Kingdom) Cahal Curley	(United Kingdom) Austin Frazer	Porsche
1975	(United Kingdom) Roger Clark	(United Kingdom) Jim Porter	Ford Escort RS1800
1976	(Finland) Ari Vatanen	(United Kingdom) Peter Bryant	Ford Escort RS1800
1977	(Finland) Pentti Airikkala	(Finland) Risto Virtanen	Vauxhall Chevette HSR
1978	(United Kingdom) Tony Pond	(United Kingdom) Fred Gallagher	Triumph TR7 V8
1979	(United Kingdom) Russell Brookes	(United Kingdom) Paul White	Ford Escort RS1800
1980	(United Kingdom) Tony Pond	(United Kingdom) Fred Gallagher	Triumph TR7 V8
1981	(United Kingdom) Tony Pond	(United Kingdom) Mike Nicholson	Vauxhall Chevette HSR
1982	(United Kingdom) Jimmy McRae	(United Kingdom) Ian Grindrod	Opel Ascona 400
1983	(Finland) Henri Toivonen	(United Kingdom) Fred Gallagher	Opel Manta 400
1984	(United Kingdom) Jimmy McRae	(United Kingdom) Mike Nicholson	Opel Manta 400
1985	(United Kingdom) Russell Brookes	(United Kingdom) Mike Broad	Opel Manta 400
1986	(United Kingdom) Tony Pond	(United Kingdom) Rob Arthur	MG Metro 6R4
1987	(United Kingdom) Jimmy McRae	(United Kingdom) Ian Grindrod	Ford Sierra RS Cosworth
1988	(Belgium) Patrick Snijers	(Belgium) Dany Colebunders	BMW M3
1989	(United Kingdom) Russell Brookes	(United Kingdom) Neil Wilson	Ford Sierra RS Cosworth
1990	(United Kingdom) Russell Brookes	(United Kingdom) Neil Wilson	Ford Sierra RS Cosworth
1991	(United Kingdom) Colin McRae	(United Kingdom) Derek Ringer	Subaru Legacy RS
1992	(United Kingdom) Colin McRae	(United Kingdom) Derek Ringer	Subaru Legacy RS
1993	(United Kingdom) Richard Burns	(United Kingdom) Robert Reid	Subaru Legacy RS
1994	(United Kingdom) Malcolm Wilson	(United Kingdom) Bryan Thomas	Ford Escort RS Cosworth
1995	(Republic of Ireland) Frank Meagher	(United Kingdom) Michael Maher	Ford Escort RS Cosworth
1996	(Germany) Armin Schwarz	(France) Denis Giraudet	Toyota Celica GT-Four ST205
1997	(United Kingdom) Martin Rowe	(United Kingdom) Nicky Beech	Renault Mégane Maxi
1998	(United Kingdom) Martin Rowe	(United Kingdom) Derek Ringer	Renault Mégane Maxi
1999	(United Kingdom) Martin Rowe	(United Kingdom) Derek Ringer	Renault Mégane Maxi
2000	(Isle of Man) Mark Higgins	(United Kingdom) Bryan Thomas	Vauxhall Astra Kit Car
2001	Cancelled due to the United Kingdom foot-and-mouth crisis.		
2002	(Isle of Man) Mark Higgins	(United Kingdom) Craig Thorley	Toyota Corolla WRC
2003	(United Kingdom) Jonny Milner	(United Kingdom) Nicky Beech	Toyota Corolla WRC
2004	(United Kingdom) Jonny Milner	(United Kingdom) Nicky Beech	Subaru Impreza WRC
2005	(Isle of Man) Mark Higgins	(United Kingdom) Bryan Thomas	Ford Focus RS WRC 02
2006	(Republic of Ireland) Eugene Donnelly	(Republic of Ireland) Paul Kiely	Toyota Corolla WRC
2007	(Republic of Ireland) Eugene Donnelly	(Republic of Ireland) Paul Kiely	Subaru Impreza WRC
2008	(Isle of Man) Mark Higgins	(Republic of Ireland) Rory Kennedy	Subaru Impreza WRX STI
2009	(Isle of Man) Mark Higgins	(United Kingdom) Bryan Thomas	Subaru Impreza WRX STI
2010	(Republic of Ireland) Keith Cronin	(Republic of Ireland) Barry McNulty	Subaru Impreza WRX STI
2011	Cancelled		
2012	(Isle of Man) Steven Quine	(Isle of Man) Richard Skinner	Mitsubishi Lancer Evo 6
2013	(United Kingdom) Arron Newby	(Isle of Man) Rob Fagg	Subaru Impreza N11
2014	(Isle of Man) Nigel Cannell	(Isle of Man) Michaela Cannell	Mitsubishi Lancer Evo 9
2015	(United Kingdom) Steve Colley	(Isle of Man) Andrew Cowley	Mitsubishi Lancer Evo 9
2016	(United Kingdom) Elfyn Evans	(United Kingdom) Craig Parry	Ford Fiesta R5
2017	(Republic of Ireland) Keith Cronin	(Republic of Ireland) Mikie Galvin	Ford Fiesta R5
2018–2025	Not held		

=== Multiple winners ===
Wins	Manufacturer
17	(United Kingdom) Ford
9	(Japan) Subaru
4	(Germany) Opel
4	(Japan) Toyota
3	(United Kingdom) Mini
3	(Japan) Mitsubishi
3	(United Kingdom) Vauxhall
3	(France) Renault
2	(United Kingdom) Triumph
