= Eugene Donnelly =

Eugene Donnelly (born 13 January 1967) is a rally driver from Derry, Northern Ireland, who races in the Irish Tarmac Rally Championship.

== Career ==
Eugene Donnelly has been rallying for 30 years. His first rally was the Cavan Stages Rally in 1984. His 1st win came in 2002 in Galway.

== Car ==
He drove a G3 Escort in the national events during his early days. Eugene drove a Toyota Corolla WRC for three years [2004-2006]. He won three championships with the Corolla [KAM 651]. He tested the Subaru Impreza S11 of Derek Mc Garritys with Prodrive in the 2006 Donegal Harvest Stages Rally which he won with James Sharkey as co-driver. Eugene switched to a Subaru Impreza S12 WRC [CT06 SRT] for the 2007 season. Towards the end of the 2007 season Eugene purchased a Škoda Fabia WRC [46-XF-JH]. In 2012 he drove a Mini John Cooper Works WRC run by McGeehan motorsport The first Mini WRC car to run in Irish rallying.

== 2007 Season ==
Eugene Donnelly started the 2007 season in a brand new Subaru Impreza S12 WRC [CT06 SRT]. The First Round was the Galway International Rally, Double World Rally Champion Marcus Grönholm was seeded Number One. Marcus was to use the Galway International as a 'Shakedown' for Rally Ireland 2007. It was Eugene who led Marcus Grönholm after Day One by 5.4 seconds. After 16 nail biting stages Eugene's Impreza WRC understeered into a ditch. Round Two was the Easter International Rally [Circuit Of Ireland] and Eugene finished in 2nd place behind his main rival Mark Higgins. Killarney Rally of the Lakes was the third round and it was a big chapter for Irish Rallying, This would be the first event that Eugene would be driving for Reid Motorsport. The Rally Of The Lakes was won by Kris Meeke. Eugene finished second and rival Mark Higgins finished in fourth place. Mark was leading the ITC Championship by 14 points Jim Clark Memorial Rally was Round Four. Eugene won the event comfortably and scored 15 points while his Mark Higgins [driving a Group-N Impreza because it was a Round of the BRC] scored 8 points Round Five, the Donegal International Rally marked an exciting event for Eugene as this was the first time that five time world rally champion Sébastien Loeb came over and used Donegal as a 'Shakedown' for Rally Ireland. Sebastien won the event but Mark Higgins scored maximum points because Sebastian was not registered for ITC points. After a great battle with Kevin Lynch, Eugene finished 2nd. The Manx International Rally played host to the Sixth Round of the ITC Championship. Another great battle occurred between young Norwegian Andreas Mikklesen and Irish Tarmac Champion Eugene Donnelly on the opening day. It was Eugene who came out front and scored maximum points. Eugene's rival Mark Higgins was driving a Group-N Impreza seeing as it was a round of the British Rally Championship scored 0 points as Mark crashed out on the opening loop. Eugene was now leading the Irish Tarmac Championship by just 5 points over Rival Mark Higgins. Round Seven was held in Ulster. Local Star Kris Meeke won the event. Eugene scored 12 points while Mark Higgins scored 8. The Cork 20 Rally was the Final Round of the 2007 season. WRC Stars Sébastien Loeb, Dani Sordo and Mikko Hirvonen came to Cork to use it for a 'shakedown' for Rally Ireland but the main focus was on Eugene Donnelly and Mark Higgins. Both drivers had everything to drive for but it was Mark who finished one place ahead of Eugene but that awarded Eugene the 2007 Irish Tarmac Rally Championship for the fourth consecutive year/

== 2008 Season ==
Due to the collapse of Reid Motorsport, Eugene found it difficult to secure the budget to defend his 2007 ITC title, however he participated in 3 out of 8 rounds of the Irish Tarmac Championship. Using used Jack Sleator's S12 WRC [HT55 SRT] for the 1st round in Galway and retired due to Mechanical Problems. The next Round for Eugene was Donegal, Eugene used his Škoda Fabia for that Round and finished first ahead of Kevin Lynch and Eamonn Boland. The Cork 20 International was the next Round for Eugene but was a disappointing Round as Eugene retired on Stage 2 again due to Mechanical Problems The 2008 Irish Tarmac Championship was awarded to Eamonn Boland

== 2009 Season ==
Eugene secured the budget for drive his Škoda Fabia for the 2009 Irish Tarmac Championship. The First Round kicked off with the Galway International. WRC star Conrad Rautenbach and JWRC star Aaron Burkart used Galway as a 'shakedown' for the Rally Ireland 2009. Galway proved a tough event as 2008 Irish Tarmac Champion Eamonn Boland, Dungiven's Kevin Lynch, Two Time ITC Champion Derek McGarrity were all forced to retire. Eugene won the event and scored 15 points. Round Two was the Circuit of Ireland. Eugene took an early lead but first place switched over numerous times between Eugene and local man Peadar Hurson, however it was Eugene who came out on top and scored another 15 points. This rally marked Eugene's 16th ITC win. The Rally of the Lakes in Kerry played home to Round Three of the 2009 ITC. After Day One it was Young Dubliner Gareth MacHale who led the event by 2.2 seconds over Eugene. However, Stage 11 claimed both Gareth [Off-Road] and Eugene [Off-Road] giving the lead to Eamonn Boland. One Stage later Eamonn punctured his Impreza S12C giving the lead to Meath Man Tim McNulty. McNulty held onto his lead and won the 2009 Rally Of The Lakes. Round Four was held in Scotland.

== Navigating ==
In early January 2018, Donnelly announced a new career path that would see him develop the new Hyundai i20 from the passenger seat.

== Irish Tarmac Rally Championship wins ==
- 2003 Rally of the Lakes - Donnelly, Kiely (Subaru Impreza S5 WRC '98)
- 2004 Donegal International Rally - Donnelly, Kiely (Toyota Corolla WRC)
- 2004 Cork 20 Rally - Donnelly, Kiely (Toyota Corolla WRC)
- 2005 Galway International Rally - Donnelly, Kiely (Toyota Corolla WRC)
- 2005 Donegal International Rally - Donnelly, Kiely (Toyota Corolla WRC)
- 2006 Galway International Rally - Donnelly, Kiely (Toyota Corolla WRC)
- 2006 Circuit of Ireland - Donnelly, Kiely (Toyota Corolla WRC)
- 2006 Manx Rally - Donnelly, Kiely (Toyota Corolla WRC)
- 2006 Ulster Rally - Donnelly, Kiely (Toyota Corolla WRC)
- 2007 Jim Clark Rally - Donnelly, Kiely (Subaru Impreza S12 WRC '06)
- 2007 Manx Rally - Donnelly, Kiely (Subaru Impreza S12 WRC '06)
- 2008 Donegal International Rally - Donnelly, Kiely (Škoda Fabia WRC)
- 2009 Galway International Rally - Donnelly, Toner (Škoda Fabia WRC)
- 2009 Circuit of Ireland - Donnelly, Toner (Škoda Fabia WRC)
- 2009 Ulster Rally - Donnelly, Toner (Škoda Fabia WRC)

== WRC results ==
Year	Entrant	Car	1	2	3	4	5	6	7	8	9	10	11	12	13	14	15	16	WDC	Points
2007	Eugene Donnelly	Škoda Fabia WRC	MON	SWE	NOR	MEX	POR	ARG	ITA	GRE	FIN	GER	NZL	ESP	FRA	JPN	IRE; Ret	GBR	NC	0
