= RTÉ Sports Hall of Fame Award =

Irish sports award

- Country: Ireland
- Presented by: RTÉ Sport
- First award: 2006; 20 years ago
- Most recent winner: Michael Carruth (2024; boxing)
- Website: Official website

The RTÉ Hall of Fame Award is an award given annually as part of the RTÉ Sports Awards ceremony each December. The award is given to a sportsperson who has made a major impact on the world of sport during their lifetime and in association with the Irish Sports Council. The winner is selected by a judging panel appointed by RTÉ Sport.

The most recent winner, in 2024, was Michael Carruth.

== Winners ==
=== By year ===
RTÉ/Irish Sports Council Hall of Fame Award winners
| Year | Nat. | Winner | Sport | Rationale | Note |
|---|---|---|---|---|---|
| 2006 | IRL | Billy Coleman | Car rallying | In a twenty-year rallying career, the Millstreet Maestro became Ireland's most successful rally driver of all time. | |
| 2007 | IRL | Johnny Giles | Football | The legendary Manchester United and Leeds United midfielder won his first Irish international cap before he was 19. He went on to captain the Irish side before he embarked on a management career that took in spells as player-manager of Ireland, as well as spells as boss of West Bromwich Albion and Shamrock Rovers. | |
| 2008 | IRL | Maeve Kyle | Athletics | After competing in the Melbourne, Rome and Tokyo Olympics, and took the bronze in the 400m at the 1966 European Indoor Athletics Championships. She was also a competitive hockey player, gaining 58 Irish caps as well as being named in the World All Star team in 1953 and 1959. | |
| 2009 | IRL | Mick O'Dwyer | Gaelic football | One of the most respected and much loved figures in Gaelic games, he has been involved in Gaelic football at the highest level for over 50 years, winning four All-Ireland medals as a player before leading Kerry to eight All-Ireland titles from ten final appearances in a 12-year period. | |
| 2010 | NIR | Dennis Taylor | Snooker | Marking 25 years since his 1985 World Snooker Championship win in which he beat the world No. 1 Steve Davis on the black ball in a final often described as one of the sports greatest. | |
| 2011 | NIR | Jack Kyle | Rugby union | Kyle helped Ireland to their first ever Grand Slam win in 1948 and a further two Triple Crowns in 1948 and 1949 and the Five Nations Championship in 1951. | |
| 2012 | ENG | Jack Charlton | Football | During his 10-year reign as manager, the Republic of Ireland qualified for two FIFA World Cups, a UEFA European Championship and peaked at No.6 in the FIFA World rankings. | |
| 2013 | IRL | Paul McGrath | Football | The cultured defender, who enjoyed long stints with both Manchester United and Aston Villa, also represented the Republic of Ireland at the 1990 and 1994 FIFA World Cups, as well as UEFA Euro 1988. | |
| 2014 | IRL | Brian O'Driscoll | Rugby union | During a stellar career in which he became the most-capped player in rugby union history, O'Driscoll captained Leinster, Ireland and the British and Irish Lions, winning the RBS Six Nations twice and the Heineken Cup three times along the way. | |
| 2015 | IRL | Henry Shefflin | Hurling | He won a record ten All-Ireland medals on the field of play as well as thirteen Leinster medals and six National Hurling League medals before his retirement in 2014. | |
| 2016 | IRL | Anthony Foley | Rugby union | He captained the Munster team that won their first ever Heineken Cup in 2006 and won 62 caps for Ireland from 1995 to 2005. Foley died suddenly in October 2016. | |
| 2017 | IRL | Ken Doherty | Snooker | As an amateur, Doherty won the Irish Amateur Championship twice, the World Under-21 Amateur Championship and the World Amateur Championship. Turning professional in 1990, Doherty has won a total of 6 ranking tournaments including the 1997 World Snooker Championship. | |
| 2018 | IRL | Ray Houghton | Association football | Scored at the 1988 European Championship | |
| 2019 | IRL | Sonia O'Sullivan | Track and field | Won an Olympic silver medal in the 5,000 metres event. | |
| 2021 | IRL | John Treacy | Athletics | Won a medal at the Olympics before working at Sport Ireland | |
| 2022 | IRL | Jimmy Barry-Murphy | Gaelic football | Winner of the All-Ireland Senior Hurling Championship and All-Ireland Senior Club Football Championship with Cork GAA | |
| 2023 | IRL | Jason Smyth | Athletics | Smyth retired this year having never lost a competitive para athletics event throughout his entire career. | |
| 2024 | IRL | Michael Carruth | Boxing | The welterweight boxer won a Gold medal at the 1992 Summer Olympics in Barcelona | |
