= Gareth MacHale =

Irish rally driver (born 1980)

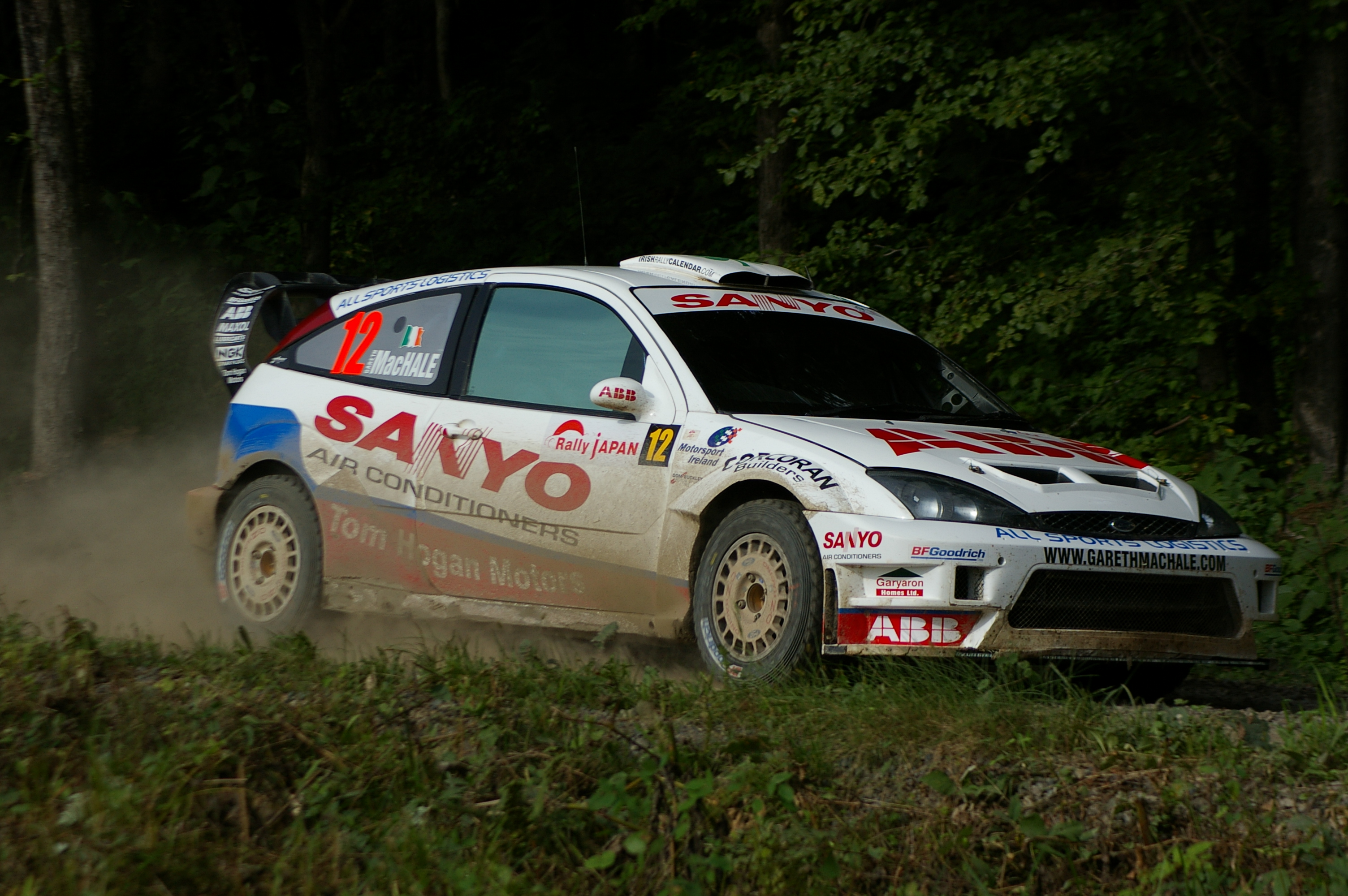
- MacHale in his Ford Focus RS WRC 04 on the 2006 Rally Japan.

Personal information
- Nationality: (Republic of Ireland) Irish
- Born: August 12, 1980 (age 46)

World Rally Championship record
- Years active: 2006 – 2009
- Co-driver: (Republic of Ireland) Paul Nagle (United Kingdom) Allan Harryman (Republic of Ireland) Brian Murphy
- Rallies: 14
- Championships: 0
- Rally wins: 0
- Podiums: 0
- Stage wins: 0
- Total points: 4
- First rally: 2006 Monte Carlo Rally

Gareth MacHale (born 12 August 1980) is an Irish rally driver, who has scored points in the World Rally Championship.

== Career ==
MacHale comes from a family with a background in rallying. His father Austin MacHale is a five-time Irish Tarmac Rally Championship champion. Gareth's younger brother Aaron is also a rally driver.

MacHale competed in an eight-round programme in the 2006 World Rally Championship season in a privately entered Ford Focus WRC. He finished sixth on Rally Mexico, scoring three world championship points. In 2007 he competed in five WRC events, finishing eighth on his home round Rally Ireland, which was being run as a WRC event for the first time. He competed in Rally Ireland again in 2009, but retired.

In 2008, MacHale competed in the Race of Champions.

In 2010, MacHale followed in his father's footsteps by winning the Irish Tarmac Rally Championship for the first time.

=== WRC results ===
Year	Entrant	Car	1	2	3	4	5	6	7	8	9	10	11	12	13	14	15	16	WDC	Points
2006	Gareth MacHale	Ford Focus RS WRC 04	MON; 16	SWE	MEX; 6	ESP; Ret	FRA	ARG; 11	ITA; 11	GRE	GER; 10	FIN	JPN; Ret	CYP	TUR	AUS	NZL		22nd	3
2006	Gareth MacHale	Ford Focus RS WRC 03																GBR; Ret	22nd	3
2007	Gareth MacHale	Ford Focus RS WRC 03	MON; 11	SWE	NOR														23rd	1
2007	Gareth MacHale	Ford Focus RS WRC 06				MEX; Ret	POR; 13	ARG	ITA; Ret	GRE	FIN	GER	NZL	ESP	FRA	JPN	IRE; 8	GBR	23rd	1
2009	Gareth MacHale	Ford Focus RS WRC 04	IRE; Ret	NOR	CYP	POR	ARG	ITA	GRE	POL	FIN	AUS	ESP	GBR					NC	0
