= Billy Coleman =

Irish rally driver (born 1947)

Personal information
- Nationality: (Republic of Ireland) Irish
- Born: 8 May 1947 (age 79); Millstreet, Cork, Ireland

World Rally Championship record
- Years active: 1973–1979, 1985
- Co-driver: (Republic of Ireland) Dan O'Sullivan (United Kingdom) Jim Porter (United Kingdom) Martin Holmes (Republic of Ireland) Ronan Morgan
- Teams: Thomas Motors of Blackpool; The Chequered Flag; David Sutton Cars Ltd; Porsche
- Rallies: 8
- Rally wins: 0
- Podiums: 0
- Stage wins: 0
- Total points: 10
- First rally: 1973 RAC Rally
- Last rally: 1985 Tour de Corse

British Rally Championship
- Years active: 1968–1987
- Starts: 53
- Wins: 6
- Podiums: 14
- Best finish: Winner in 1974

Irish Tarmac Rally Championship
- Years active: 1979–1987
- Starts: 26
- Wins: 11
- Podiums: 13
- Best finish: Winner in 1984

National Rally Championship
- Years active: 1970–1984
- Starts: 8
- Wins: 5
- Podiums: 5

Billy Coleman (born 8 May 1947) is an Irish motorsport rally driver. Nicknamed Millstreet Maestro, Billy Coleman is one of Ireland's most successful motorsport rally drivers and in twenty years of racing has claimed 29 victories, including a number of British Rally Championship and Irish Tarmac Rally Championship titles. He is the older brother of John Coleman who was a Gaelic footballer.

== Life and career ==
Billy Coleman is a farmer outside of Kanturk and native to Millstreet, County Cork, where he still resides. He developed an interest in cars from an early age, reminiscing how his father let him steer the car sitting on his knee at the age of five. His father Paddy Coleman was the local Ford main dealer and owned a motor garage in Millstreet. Spending time at his father's garage further nurtured Coleman's early interest in cars. Coleman studied commerce at University College Cork, but preferred farming as his occupation, and undertook it full time after finishing up his racing career. His first racing car was Ford Cortina which Coleman drove in 1967. In 1969, a crashed Ford Escort was acquired, repaired and converted into a rally car. It was in this car (a self-prepared green Ford Escort Mark I; TIU 250) in 1969, that Coleman won the special stage ahead of the works Ford Escort of Roger Clark. Coleman dominated the rallies in Ireland and Britain the 1970s and 1980s. He has also been seen in international arena, including in Corsica and Monte Carlo. In his racing career, Coleman drove Ford Cortina, Ford Escort, Alpine-Renault, Lancia Stratos, Fiat-Abarth 131, Opel Manta 400, Porsche 911, Porsche 959, MG Metro 6R4 and BMW M3. Coleman's two sons, Robby Coleman and Gordon Coleman, also take part in Irish and British racing events.

== Legacy ==
=== RTÉ Sports Hall of Fame Award ===
In 2006, Coleman was awarded RTÉ Sports Hall of Fame Award for his achievements in rallying.

=== DVD ===
Coleman features in the Tarmac Titans DVD series on rally legends.

=== Young driver of the year award ===
The Billy Coleman Young Driver of the Year Award was conceived in 2000 in a partnership between Motorsport Ireland, Sport Ireland and Team Ireland. The aim of the award is to "motivate young Irish rally drivers to step up into the international arena and rival the achievements of the young Billy Coleman".

=== Influence ===
Irish-American billionaire, philanthropist, life-long motorsports supporter John Campion attributed much of his motivation to succeed to Billy Coleman's achievements as a rally driver. Campion supported the launch of the Team Ireland Foundation in Dublin in 2016, where in his speech he said:

As a young boy in Cork I found myself struggling with school and at a loss as to what I would do with my life. But I always felt a bond with motorsport after witnessing Billy Coleman, a farmer who became a world rallying icon, competing near my home in Cork. After seeing Billy rallying I realised then that if you put your mind to it, you could achieve anything.

John Campion emigrated to United States where he become the chairman and CEO of an international energy corporation, and a philanthropist focusing on health, education and nutrition as well as sponsor of racing drivers through his motorsports organization CJJ Motorsports. In his possession Campion had a collection of Lancia rally cars, inspired by Lancia Stratos HF driven by Billy Coleman in 1978.

== Racing record ==
Between his active racing years 1968 to 1987, Billy Coleman started in 128 national and international rally events and claimed 29 victories.

Season	Series	Car	Races	Race Wins	Title Win
1969	British Rally Championship	Ford Escort Mk I	1	0	
1970	National Rally Championship	Ford Escort Mk I	1	1	
1970	British Rally Championship	Ford Escort Mk I	1	0	
1971	National Rally Championship	Ford Escort Mk I Alpine-Renault A110	1	1	
1971	British Rally Championship	Ford Escort Mk I Alpine-Renault A110	3	0	
1971	European Rally Championship	Ford Escort Mk I Alpine-Renault A110	2	0	
1971	International Championship for Manufacturers	Ford Escort Mk I Alpine-Renault A110	2	0	
1972	National Rally Championship	Ford Escort Mk I Alpine-Renault A110	2	1	
1972	British Rally Championship	Ford Escort Mk I Alpine-Renault A110	3	0	
1972	International Championship for Manufacturers	Ford Escort Mk I Alpine-Renault A110	2	0	
1973	British Rally Championship	Ford Escort RS 1600 MKI	1	0	
1973	European Rally Championship	Ford Escort RS 1600 MKI	1	0	
1973	World Rally Championship	Ford Escort RS 1600 MKI	1	0	
1974	British Rally Championship	Ford Escort RS 1600 MKI	6	1	Winner
1974	European Rally Championship	Ford Escort RS 1600 MKI	4	0	
1974	World Rally Championship	Ford Escort RS 1600 MKI	1	0	
1975	British Rally Championship	Ford Escort RS 1600 MKI; Ford Escort RS 1800 MKII	10	3	
1975	European Rally Championship	Ford Escort RS 1600 MKI; Ford Escort RS 1800 MKII	6	1	
1975	World Rally Championship	Ford Escort RS 1600 MKI; Ford Escort RS 1800 MKII	1	0	
1976	National Rally Championship	Ford Escort RS 1800 MKII; Lancia Stratos HF	1	1	
1976	British Rally Championship	Ford Escort RS 1800 MKII; Lancia Stratos HF	10	1	
1976	European Rally Championship	Ford Escort RS 1800 MKII; Lancia Stratos HF	5	2	
1976	World Rally Championship	Ford Escort RS 1800 MKII; Lancia Stratos HF	1	0	
1977	British Rally Championship	Lancia Stratos HF; Fiat 131 Abarth	7	0	
1977	European Rally Championship	Lancia Stratos HF; Fiat 131 Abarth	8	0	
1977	World Rally Championship	Lancia Stratos HF; Fiat 131 Abarth	1	0	
1978	British Rally Championship	Lancia Stratos HF; Ford Escort RS 1800 MKII	1	0	
1978	European Rally Championship	Lancia Stratos HF; Ford Escort RS 1800 MKII	5	0	
1978	World Rally Championship	Lancia Stratos HF; Ford Escort RS 1800 MKII	1	0	
1979	Irish Tarmac Rally Championship	Ford Escort RS 1800 MKII; Porsche Carrera RS	2	1	
1979	British Rally Championship	Ford Escort RS 1800 MKII; Porsche Carrera RS	2	0	
1979	European Rally Championship	Ford Escort RS 1800 MKII; Porsche Carrera RS	7	1	
1979	World Rally Championship	Ford Escort RS 1800 MKII; Porsche Carrera RS	1	0	
1980	Irish Tarmac Rally Championship	Ford Escort RS 1800 MKII	2	0	
1980	British Rally Championship	Ford Escort RS 1800 MKII	1	0	
1980	European Rally Championship	Ford Escort RS 1800 MKII	3	0	
1981	Irish Tarmac Rally Championship	Ford Escort RS 1800 MKII	1	0	
1981	European Rally Championship	Ford Escort RS 1800 MKII	1	0	
1982	Irish Tarmac Rally Championship	Ford Escort RS 1800 MKII; Opel Ascona 400	2	0	
1982	National Rally Championship	Ford Escort RS 1800 MKII; Opel Ascona 400	1	0	
1982	British Rally Championship	Ford Escort RS 1800 MKII; Opel Ascona 400	1	0	
1982	European Rally Championship	Ford Escort RS 1800 MKII; Opel Ascona 400	1	0	
1983	Irish Tarmac Rally Championship	Ford Escort RS 1800 MKII; Opel Ascona 400	2	1	
1983	British Rally Championship	Ford Escort RS 1800 MKII; Opel Ascona 400	1	0	
1983	European Rally Championship	Ford Escort RS 1800 MKII; Opel Ascona 400	1	0	
1984	Irish Tarmac Rally Championship	Opel Manta 400	6	4	Winner
1984	National Rally Championship	Opel Manta 400	1	1	
1984	British Rally Championship	Opel Manta 400	2	1	
1984	European Rally Championship	Opel Manta 400	1	0	
1985	Irish Tarmac Rally Championship	Porsche 911 SC RS; Ford Escort G3	4	2	
1985	British Rally Championship	Porsche 911 SC RS; Ford Escort G3	1	0	
1985	European Rally Championship	Porsche 911 SC RS; Ford Escort G3	1	0	
1985	World Rally Championship	Porsche 911 SC RS; Ford Escort G3	1	0	
1986	Irish Tarmac Rally Championship	Porsche 911 SC RS; MG Metro 6R4	5	3	
1986	British Rally Championship	Porsche 911 SC RS; MG Metro 6R4	2	0	
1986	European Rally Championship	Porsche 911 SC RS; MG Metro 6R4	2	0	
1987	Irish Tarmac Rally Championship	BMW M3 E30	2	0	
1987	British Rally Championship	BMW M3 E30	1	0	
1987	European Rally Championship	BMW M3 E30	1	0	

=== Complete IMC results ===
Year	Entrant	Car	1	2	3	4	5	6	7	8	9
1971	Billy Coleman	Ford Escort TC	MON	SWE ?	ITA	KEN	MAR	AUT	GRE	FRA	
1971	Billy Coleman	Alpine-Renault A110 1600									GBR; Ret
1972	Billy Coleman	Alpine-Renault A110 1600	MON	SWE; 49	KEN	MAR	GRE	AUT	ITA	USA	GBR; Ret

=== Complete WRC results ===
Year	Entrant	Car	1	2	3	4	5	6	7	8	9	10	11	12	13	WDC	Pts
1973	Billy Coleman	Ford Escort RS1600	MON	SWE	POR	KEN	MOR	GRE	POL	FIN	AUT	ITA	USA	GBR; 20	FRA	N/A	N/A
1974	Thomas Motors of Blackpool	Ford Escort RS1600	POR	KEN	FIN	ITA	CAN	USA	GBR; 8	FRA						N/A	N/A
1975	Thomas Motors of Blackpool	Ford Escort RS1800	MON	SWE	KEN	GRE	MOR	POR	FIN	ITA	FRA	GBR; 6				N/A	N/A
1976	Thomas Motors of Blackpool	Ford Escort RS1800	MON	SWE	POR	KEN	GRC	MOR	FIN	ITA	FRA	GBR; 6				N/A	N/A
1977	The Chequered Flag	Lancia Stratos HF	MON	SWE	POR	KEN	NZL	GRC	FIN	CAN	ITA	FRA	GBR; Ret			N/A	N/A
1978	David Sutton Cars Ltd	Ford Escort RS1800	MON	SWE	KEN	POR	GRE; 7	FIN	CAN	ITA	CIV	FRA	GBR			N/A	N/A
1979	Billy Coleman	Porsche Carrera RS	MON; 30	SWE	POR	KEN	GRE	NZL	FIN	CAN	ITA	FRA	GBR	CIV		NC	0
1985	Rothmans Porsche Rally Team	Porsche 911 SC RS	MON	SWE	POR	KEN	FRA; 4	GRC	NZL	ARG	FIN	ITA	CIV	GBR		22nd	10
