= Jimmy McRae =

British rally driver (born 1943)

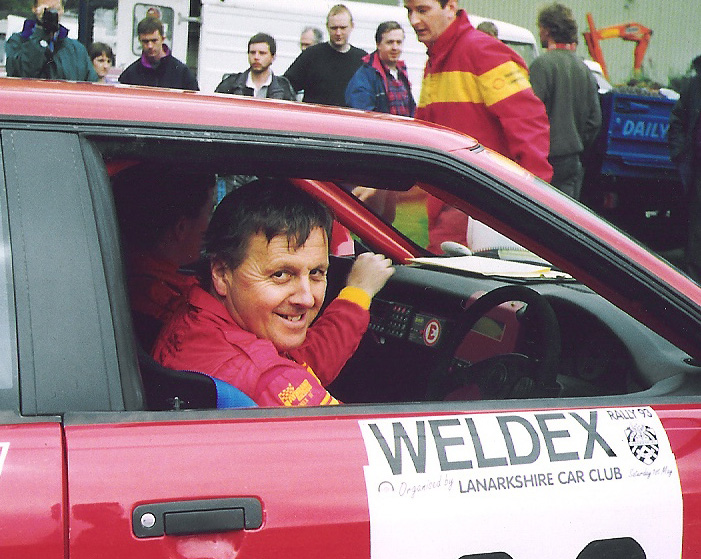
- McRae on a stage rally in Scotland. April 1993

Personal information
- Nationality: (United Kingdom) British
- Full name: James Steele McRae
- Born: 28 October 1943 (age 83); Lanark, Scotland

World Rally Championship record
- Years active: 1976–2004
- Co-driver: (United Kingdom) Ian Muir (United Kingdom) Mike Nicholson (United Kingdom) Ian Grindrod (United Kingdom) Rob Arthur (United Kingdom) David Senior (United Kingdom) Chris Wood (United Kingdom) Pauline Gullick
- Teams: Vauxhall, Opel, Austin Rover
- Rallies: 25
- Championships: 0
- Rally wins: 0
- Podiums: 2
- Stage wins: 15
- Total points: 56
- First rally: 1976 RAC Rally
- Last rally: 2015 Wales Rally GB

James Steele McRae (born 28 October 1943) is a Scottish former rally driver. He was highly successful in the British Rally Championship, winning the title a record five times in 1981, 1982, 1984, 1987 and 1988 which as of 2023 still stands. In the European Rally Championship for drivers, he was runner-up in 1982, while his highest placing in the World Rally Championship was 15th in 1983. McRae runs a plumbing business in his home town of Lanark. He and his wife Margaret had three sons, Colin, Alister and Stuart. Both Colin and Alister were World Rally Championship drivers, with Colin winning the world championship in 1995. McRae's brother-in-law Hugh "Shug" Steele is also a former rally driver.

== Career ==
McRae began his motorsport career riding in Scottish scrambles (motocross) and he was second placed in the 1969 Scottish ACU Scrambles Championship, riding an Edgar Bros, Edinburgh AJS Y4 250cc Stormer. He started his rallying at the age of 31 driving his own Mk1 Cortina fitted with Lotus running gear followed by an Escort Mk1 twin cam. The following year, he approached SMT and drove a Group 1 Vauxhall Magnum for them culminating in a works drive the following year in a DTV Gp 1 Magnum. In 1978, he was promoted to the full DTV team and drove a Group 4 Vauxhall Chevette HS then HSR in the British Rally Championship alongside a single cam Chevette in the Castrol Autosport Series, narrowly missing out on the title to Malcolm Wilson.

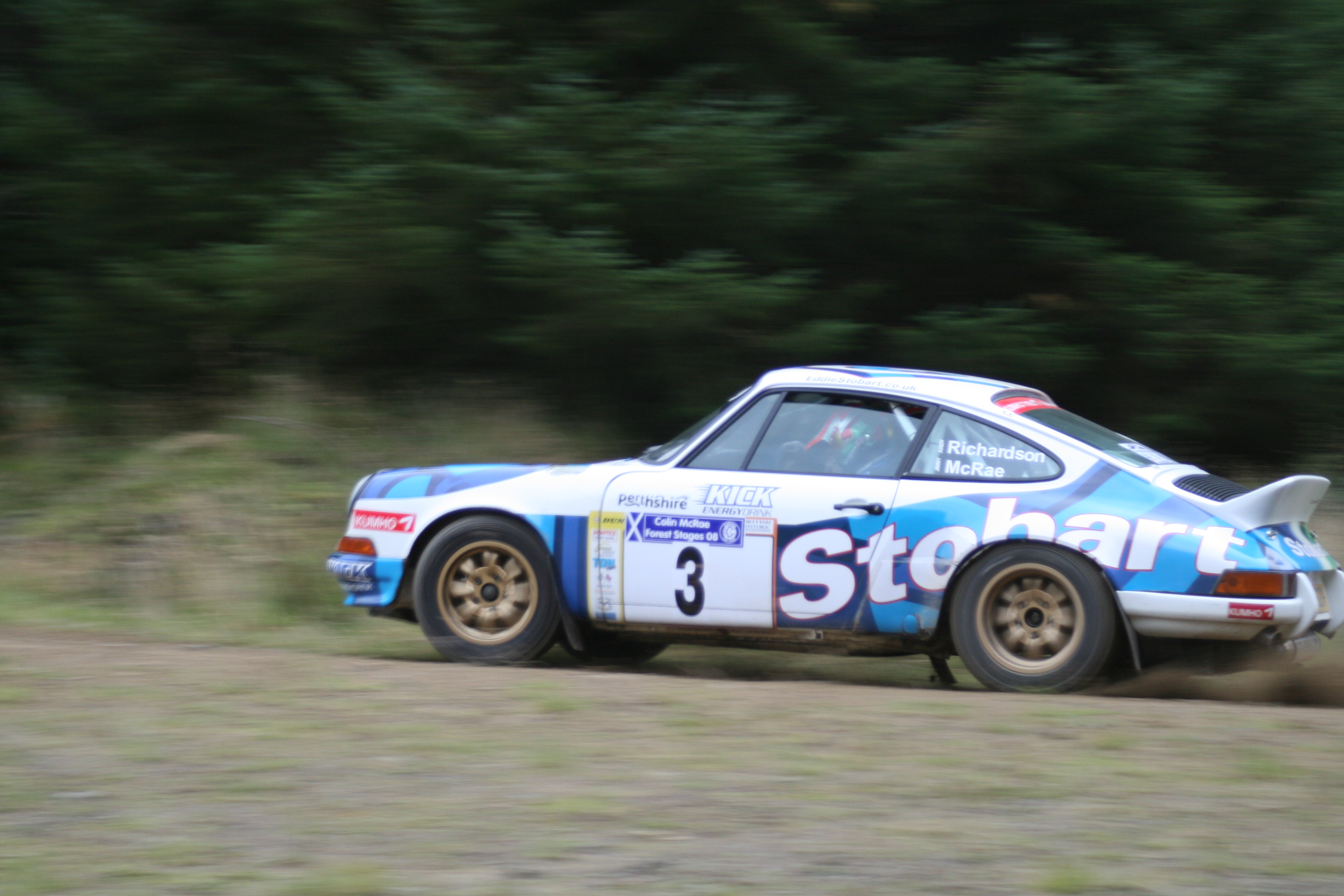
McRae at the 2008 Colin McRae Forest Stages

Throughout his career, McRae drove for a number of different teams, including Vauxhall, Opel & Ford reaching a pinnacle during his spell in the Rothmans Rally Team, driving an Opel Manta 400. During his time at Rothmans, his teammates were Ari Vatanen, Walter Röhrl and Henri Toivonen. He then progressed to the MG Metro 6R4.

Though mostly retired from motorsport now, McRae still occasionally competes on historic rallies and some Scottish Rally Championship events, with some occasional outings on the Wales Rally GB. In 2006, he won the Roger Albert Clark Rally in a Stobart Motorsport sponsored Mark 2 Ford Escort.

In September 2008, McRae was one of a number of ex-world and British champions to take part in the Colin McRae Forest Stages Rally in memory of his son, who died in 2007. He drove a Porsche 911 on the rally. The impressive entry list included ex-World Championship drivers Hannu Mikkola, Ari Vatanen, Björn Waldegård, Stig Blomqvist, Malcolm Wilson, Russell Brookes, Andrew Cowan and Louise Aitken-Walker.

McRae took part in the 2014 British Historic Championship in a Firenza Can Am finishing fourth. He also took part in the 2014 Wales Rally GB for the first time in ten years. In early August 2024, he won his class driving a Mk1 Escort on the Grampian Forest Rally, celebrating 50 years in the sport.

=== Other Racing ===
In 1985, McRae took part in a Ford Escort Celebrity race at Brands Hatch, where the field was a mix of Rally and Rallycross drivers.

In 1990, McRae contested four rounds of the British Touring Car Championship in an Ecosse Motorsport BMW M3. His best result was tenth (fifth in class) on his debut in the 1 Hour Endurance race at Donington Park, sharing with Hugh Chalmers. He was not eligible for points however, and his only points finish would be ninth in Class at Silverstone. Nevertheless, the BMW works team were impressed enough to be rumoured to be looking to hire McRae for the 1991 season but the required funding couldn't be found.

Also in 1990, McRae raced at Birmingham in the TVR Tuscan Challenge. He qualified second, alongside former double British Touring Car Champion Chris Hodgetts and finished fifth on the road. He was later promoted to fourth after Ian Flux was disqualified for performing an illegal practice start.

McRae also had a couple of outings in Caterham racing.

== Racing record ==
=== Complete WRC results ===
Year	Entrant	Car	1	2	3	4	5	6	7	8	9	10	11	12	13	14	15	16	WDC	Pts
1976	SMT Rallying with DTV / Castrol	Vauxhall Magnum Coupé	MON	SWE	POR	KEN	GRE	MOR	FIN	ITA	FRA	GBR; 12							N/A	N/A
1977	SMT Rallying with DTV / Castrol	Vauxhall Magnum Coupé	MON	SWE	POR	KEN	NZL	GRE	FIN	CAN	ITA	FRA	GBR; Ret						N/A	N/A
1978	Dealer Team Vauxhall	Vauxhall Chevette 2300 HS	MON	SWE	KEN	POR	GRE	FIN	CAN	ITA	CIV	FRA	GBR; Ret						NC	0
1979	Dealer Team Vauxhall	Vauxhall Chevette 2300 HS	MON	SWE	POR	KEN	GRE	NZL	FIN	CAN	ITA	FRA	GBR; 12	CIV					NC	0
1980	Dealer Team Vauxhall	Vauxhall Chevette 2300 HSR	MON	SWE	POR	KEN	GRC	ARG	FIN	NZL	ITA	FRA	GBR; Ret	CIV					NC	0
1981	Dealer Team Opel	Opel Ascona 400	MON	SWE	POR	KEN	FRA	GRE	ARG	BRA	FIN	ITA	CIV	GBR; Ret					NC	0
1982	Rothmans Opel Rally Team	Opel Ascona 400	MON	SWE	POR	KEN	FRA	GRE; 6	NZL	BRA	FIN	ITA	CIV	GBR; Ret					33rd	6
1983	Rothmans Opel Rally Team	Opel Manta 400	MON	SWE	POR	KEN	FRA	GRE; 6	NZL	ARG	FIN	ITA	CIV	GBR; 3					15th	15
1984	Opel Euro Team	Opel Manta 400	MON	SWE	POR	KEN	FRA	GRE	NZL	ARG	FIN	ITA	CIV	GBR; 7					36th	4
1985	Opel Euro Team	Opel Manta 400	MON	SWE	POR	KEN	FRA	GRE	NZL	ARG	FIN	ITA	CIV	GBR; 6					34th	6
1986	Austin Rover World Rally Team	MG Metro 6R4	MON	SWE	POR	KEN	FRA	GRE	NZL	ARG	FIN	CIV	ITA	GBR; 8	USA				49th	3
1987	Ford Motor Company Ltd	Ford Sierra RS Cosworth	MON	SWE	POR	KEN	FRA	GRE	USA	NZL	ARG	FIN	CIV	ITA; Ret	GBR; 3				23rd	12
1988	Gary Smith Motorsport	Ford Sierra XR4x4	MON	SWE	POR	KEN	FRA	GRE	USA	NZL; Ret	ARG	FIN	CIV	ITA					NC	0
1988	Toyota Team Europe	Toyota Celica GT-Four ST165													GBR; Ret				NC	0
1989	Mitsubishi Ralliart Europe	Mitsubishi Galant VR-4	SWE	MON	POR	KEN	FRA	GRE; 4											29th	10
1989	Gary Smith Motorsport	Ford Sierra RS Cosworth							NZL; Ret	ARG	FIN	AUS	ITA	CIV					29th	10
1989	Ford Motor Company Ltd	Ford Sierra RS Cosworth													GBR; 12				29th	10
1990	Shell Oil UK	Ford Sierra RS Cosworth 4X4	MON	POR	KEN	FRA	GRC	NZL	ARG	FIN	AUS	ITA	CIV	GBR; Ret					NC	0
1993	Shell Helix Motor Oils	Volkswagen Golf GTI	MON	SWE	POR	KEN	FRA	GRC	ARG	NZL	FIN	AUS	ITA	ESP	GBR; Ret				NC	0
1997	Hyundai Motorsport	Hyundai Accent X3	MON	SWE	KEN	POR	ESP	FRA	ARG	GRC	NZL	FIN	IDN	ITA	AUS	GBR; 32			NC	0
2003	Jimmy McRae	Subaru Impreza 555	MON	SWE	TUR	NZL	ARG	GRC	CYP	GER	FIN	AUS	ITA	FRA	ESP	GBR; 17			NC	0
2004	Jimmy McRae	Subaru Impreza 555	MON	SWE	MEX	NZL	CYP	GRC	TUR	ARG	FIN	GER	JPN	GBR; Ret	ITA	FRA	ESP	AUS	NC	0

=== Complete British Touring Car Championship results ===
(key) (Races in bold indicate pole position in class) (Races in italics indicate fastest lap in class)

Year	Team	Car	Class	1	2	3	4	5	6	7	8	9	10	11	12	13	DC	Pts	Class
1990	Ecosse Motorsport	BMW M3	B	OUL	DON ovr:10‡ cls:5‡	THR; Ret	SIL	OUL	SIL ovr:16 cls:9	BRH ovr:11‡ cls:8‡	SNE	BRH	BIR	DON	THR	SIL	36th	2	25th

‡ Endurance driver (ineligible for points).
