= Motorsport Ireland =

Governing Body for four-wheeled motorsports in Ireland

Irish Motorsport Federation Limited
- Abbreviation: MI
- Formation: 1999
- Type: Sports federation for auto racing
- Headquarters: 34 Dawson Street, Dublin 2
- Location: Dublin, Ireland
- Region served: Ireland
- Members: 32 affiliated motor clubs
- President: Aiden Harper
- Main organ: MI Council
- Parent organization: Royal Irish Automobile Club
- Affiliations: FIA
- Website: www.motorsportireland.com

Motorsport Ireland is the National Governing Body for four-wheeled motorsports in Ireland. Motorsport Ireland is affiliated to the governing body for world motorsport, the Fédération Internationale de l'Automobile (FIA), based in Geneva and Paris.

Motorsport Ireland has 32 affiliated motor clubs, which organise all sporting events. Each year there are approximately 230 events listed in the official calendar, covering 11 different branches of the sport.

== History ==
Motorsport Ireland was established in 1999 by the Royal Irish Automobile Club (RIAC), an organisation that has been in charge of motor sports since 1901. The RIAC is the holder of the sporting power on behalf of the FIA in Ireland. This power is delegated on an annual basis to Motorsport Ireland.

== Responsibilities ==
The FIA recognises a sole authority holding the sporting power in each of its affiliated countries; in Ireland, this is Motorsport Ireland.

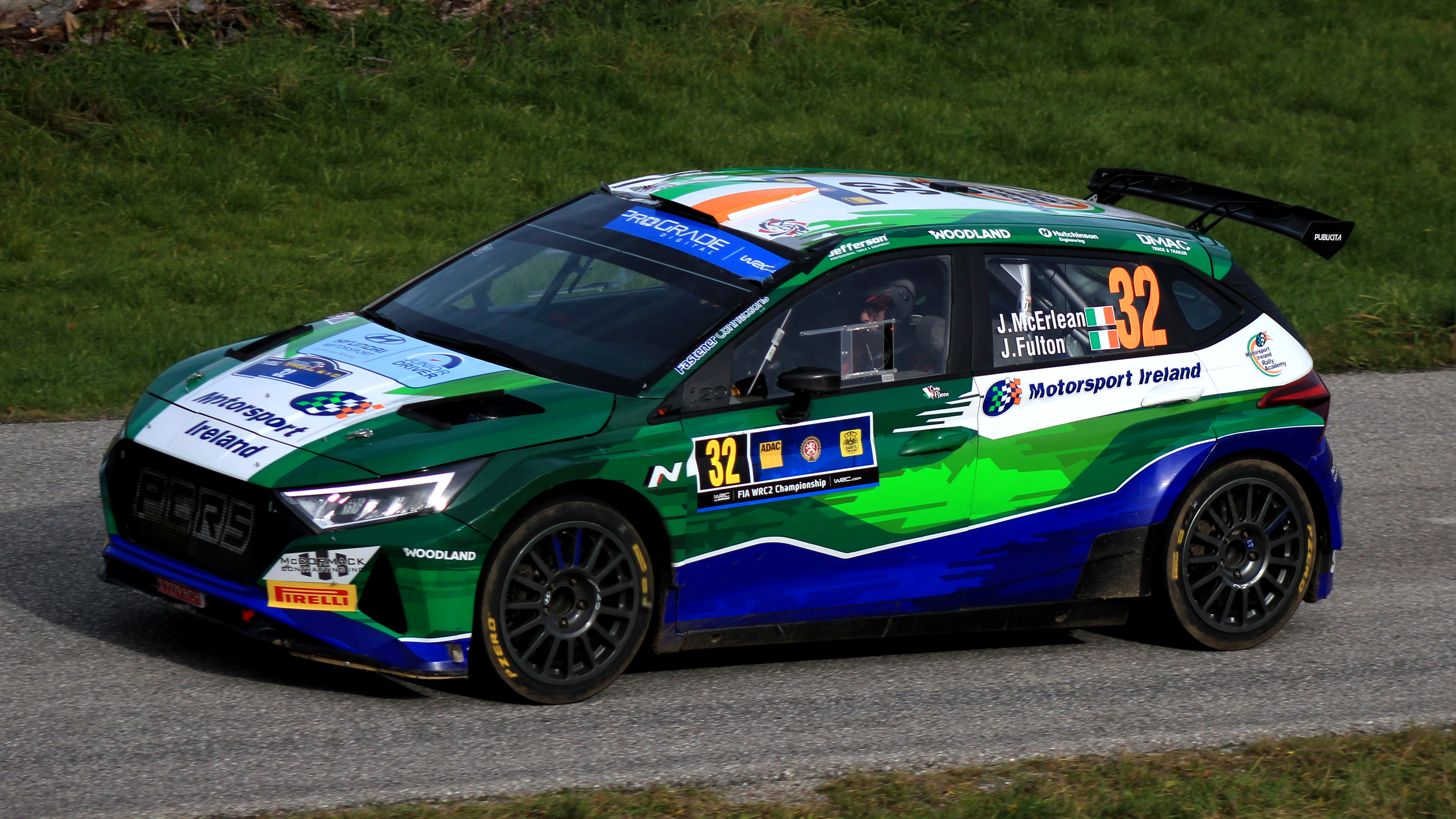
Josh McErlean and James Fulton driving for the Motorsport Ireland Rally Academy during the 2023 Central European Rally.
