= 2018 British Rally Championship =

The 2018 MSA British Rally Championship was the 60th season of the series, the premier rally competition in the UK.

The championship featured eight classes:

- BRC 1 (R5, R4, Super 2000, Regional Rally Car)
- BRC Production Cup (N4)
- BRC 3 (R3)
- BRC 4 (R2)
- National Rally Cup (open class)
- Junior BRC (R2, drivers under 26 years old)
- Cadet Cup (R2, drivers under 25 years old)
- Ladies BRC Trophy

== Calendar ==
The 2018 championship was to be contested over seven rounds in six territories England, Scotland, Wales, Northern Ireland, Isle of Man and for the second time Belgium however two events were cancelled. The events was held on both tarmac and gravel surfaces.

Border Counties Rally: On 2 March it was announced by press release that the 2018 event would be postponed. This was due to severe winter weather in the area on the weekend prior to the expected date of 10 March that would impede the stage preparation. Organisers were in talks with the BRC to make alternative arrangements however no date could be agreed and the event was abandoned for 2018.

Rally Isle of Man: On 2 September the organisers of the Rally Isle of Man, due to be held in September would be cancelled. The reason given was delays in securing the necessary Road Closure Order from the Isle of Man's Department of Infrastructure. The event is also absent from the 2019 calendar.

Round	Dates	Event	Rally HQ	Surface	Website
-	Cancelled	(United Kingdom) Border Counties Rally	Jedburgh	Gravel	(website)
1	28–29 April	(United Kingdom) Pirelli Rally	Carlisle, Cumbria	Gravel	(website)
2	22–23 June	(Belgium) Ypres Rally	Ypres, Belgium	Tarmac	(website)
3	17–18 August	(United Kingdom) Ulster Rally	Derry	Tarmac	(website)
-	Cancelled	Rally Isle of Man	Douglas, Isle of Man	Tarmac	(website)
4	4–5 October	(United Kingdom) Wales Rally GB Leg 1	Deeside	Gravel	(website)
5	6–7 October	(United Kingdom) Wales Rally GB Leg 2	Deeside	Gravel	(website)

== Team and Drivers ==
BRC1 Entries

Constructor	Car	Team	Driver	Co Driver	Rounds
Hyundai	Hyundai I20 R5	(Republic of Ireland) PCRS Rallysport	(Republic of Ireland) Keith Cronin	(Republic of Ireland) Mikie Galvin	1–3
Škoda	Škoda Fabia R5	(United Kingdom) CA1 Sport Ltd	(United Kingdom) David Bogie	(Republic of Ireland) John Rowan	All
Škoda	Škoda Fabia R5	(United Kingdom) CA1 Sport Ltd	(United Kingdom) Rhys Yates	(United Kingdom) Alex Lee	1
Škoda	Škoda Fabia R5	(United Kingdom) CA1 Sport Ltd	(United Kingdom) Rhys Yates	(United Kingdom) Elliott Edmondson	2, 4
Škoda	Škoda Fabia R5	(United Kingdom) CA1 Sport Ltd	(United Kingdom) Rhys Yates	(United Kingdom) James Morgan	3
Škoda	Škoda Fabia R5	(United Kingdom) CA1 Sport Ltd	(United Kingdom) Thomas Preston	(United Kingdom) Max Freeman	1
Škoda	Škoda Fabia R5	(United Kingdom) Dom Buckley Motorsport	(United Kingdom) Martin McCormack	(Republic of Ireland) David Moynihan	1–3
Ford	Ford Fiesta R5	(United Kingdom) M-Sport Ford World Rally Team	(United Kingdom) Matt Edwards	(United Kingdom) Darren Garrod	All
Ford	Ford Fiesta R5	(United Kingdom) M-Sport Ford World Rally Team	(United Kingdom) Alex Laffey	(United Kingdom) Patrick Walsh	All
Ford	Ford Fiesta R5	(United Kingdom) DGM Sport	(United Kingdom) Jonathan Greer	(United Kingdom) Kirsty Riddick	1, 3
Ford	Ford Fiesta R5	(United Kingdom) SW Motorsport	(United Kingdom) Sacha Kakad	(United Kingdom) James Aldridge	1, 4
Ford	Ford Fiesta R5	(United Kingdom) Dom Buckley Motorsport	(United Kingdom) Lawrence Whyte	(United Kingdom) Stuart Loudon	1
Ford	Ford Fiesta R5	(United Kingdom) Dom Buckley Motorsport	(United Kingdom) Lawrence Whyte	(United Kingdom) Paul Beaton	2, 4

BRC Productiron Cup Entries

Constructor	Car	Team	Driver	Co Driver	Rounds
Subaru	Subaru Impreza WRX STI	(United Kingdom) SW Motorsport	(United Kingdom) Spencer Wilkinson	(United Kingdom) Glyn Thomas	4

BRC4 Entries

Constructor	Car	Team	Driver	Co Driver	Rounds
Ford	Ford Fiesta R2T	(United Kingdom) Atherton Racing	(United Kingdom) Gee Atherton	(United Kingdom) Keaton Williams	1

Junior BRC Entries

Constructor	Car	Team	Driver	Co Driver	Rounds
Ford	Ford Fiesta R2T	(Republic of Ireland) Healy Motorsport	(United Kingdom) Callum Devine	(United Kingdom) Brian Hoy	1
Ford	Ford Fiesta R2T	(United Kingdom) MH Motorsport	(Norway) Oscar Solberg	(Sweden) Patrik Barth	1
Ford	Ford Fiesta R2T	(United Kingdom) MH Motorsport	(United Kingdom) Josh McErlean	(United Kingdom) Aaron Johnston	1–3
Ford	Ford Fiesta R2T	(United Kingdom) MH Motorsport	(United Kingdom) Alex Waterman	(United Kingdom) Harry Thomas	2–3
Ford	Ford Fiesta R2T	(United Kingdom) Harper Adams Motorsport	(United Kingdom) James McDiarmid	(United Kingdom) Gareth Clarke	1–3
Ford	Ford Fiesta R2T	(United Kingdom) Spencer Sport	(United Kingdom) William Hill	(United Kingdom) Richard Crozier	1–3
Peugeot	Peugeot 208 R2	(United Kingdom) DGM Sport	(United Kingdom) William Creighton	(Republic of Ireland) Liam Regan	All
Peugeot	Peugeot 208 R2	(Norway) Steve Røkland Motorsport	(Norway) Steve Røkland	(United Kingdom) Tom Woodburn	1–3
Peugeot	Peugeot 208 R2	(Norway) Steve Røkland Motorsport	(Norway) Steve Røkland	(United Kingdom) Dai Roberts	4
Peugeot	Peugeot 208 R2	(Republic of Ireland) Mc Connell Motorsport	(Republic of Ireland) Marty Gallagher	(Republic of Ireland) Dean O'Sullivan	1, 3
Peugeot	Peugeot 208 R2	(Republic of Ireland) Mc Connell Motorsport	(Republic of Ireland) Marty Gallagher	(Republic of Ireland) Rachel McConnell	2
Peugeot	Peugeot 208 R2	(United Kingdom) Melvyn Evans Motorsport	(United Kingdom) Josh Cornwell	(Republic of Ireland) Cliona Collins	1
Peugeot	Peugeot 208 R2	(United Kingdom) Melvyn Evans Motorsport	(United Kingdom) Josh Cornwell	(United Kingdom) Dai Roberts	2
Peugeot	Peugeot 208 R2	(United Kingdom) Melvyn Evans Motorsport	(United Kingdom) Nabila Tejpar	(United Kingdom) Richard Bliss	2–4
Peugeot	Peugeot 208 R2	(United Kingdom) James Wilson Rallying	(United Kingdom) James Wilson	(United Kingdom) Gavin Doherty	1–3
Vauxhall	Vauxhall Adam R2	(United Kingdom) HT Instalallations / Network Q	(United Kingdom) James Williams	(United Kingdom) Ross Whittock	1–3
Vauxhall	Vauxhall Adam R2	(United Kingdom) HT Instalallations / Network Q	(United Kingdom) James Williams	(United Kingdom) Tom Woodburn	4
Citroën	Citroën C2 R2	(United Kingdom) Scott MacBeth Rallying	(United Kingdom) Scott MacBeth	(United Kingdom) Neil Shanks	1
Škoda	Škoda Fabia R2	(Republic of Ireland) Cork Motor Club	(Republic of Ireland) Kevin Horgan	(Republic of Ireland) Liam Fouhy	All

Cadet Cup Entries

Constructor	Car	Team	Driver	Co Driver	Rounds
Ford	Ford Fiesta R2	(United Kingdom) Finlay Retson Motorsport	(United Kingdom) Finlay Retson	(United Kingdom) Tom Hynd	All
Ford	Ford Fiesta R2	(United Kingdom) Dylan Davies Rallying	(United Kingdom) Fred Field	(United Kingdom) Josh Davison	1
Ford	Ford Fiesta R2	(United Kingdom) C1 Rallying	(Iceland) Gunnar Jóhannesson	(United Kingdom) George Gwynn	1
Ford	Ford Fiesta R2	(Republic of Ireland) PCRS Rallysport	(Republic of Ireland) Johnnie Mulholland	(Republic of Ireland) Jeff Case	All
Ford	Ford Fiesta R2	(United Kingdom) Jordan Reynolds Rallying	(United Kingdom) Jordan Reynolds	(United Kingdom) Peredur Davies	All
Ford	Ford Fiesta R2	(United Kingdom) MH Motorsport	(United Kingdom) Will Graham	(United States) Alex Kihurani	1
Ford	Ford Fiesta R2	(United Kingdom) MH Motorsport	(United Kingdom) Will Graham	(United Kingdom) Max Freeman	2
Ford	Ford Fiesta R2	(United Kingdom) Myerscough University Centre	(United Kingdom) Bart Lang	(United Kingdom) Sinclair Young	1–2, 4
Vauxhall	Vauxhall Adam Cup	(United Kingdom) Vauxhall Motorsport	(United Kingdom) Connor Woods	(United Kingdom) Christopher Corry	1
Opel	Opel Adam Cup	(Germany) Opel Motorsport	(United Kingdom) Fred Field	(United Kingdom) Josh Davison	2

Ladies BRC Trophy Entries

Constructor	Car	Team	Driver	Co Driver	Rounds
Peugeot	Peugeot 208 R2	(United Kingdom) Melvyn Evans Motorsport	(United Kingdom) Nabila Tejpar	(United Kingdom) Richard Bliss	2–4

== Event results ==
Podium places and information on each event.

Round	Rally name	Podium finishers				Statistics			
Round	Rally name	Rank	Driver	Car	Time	Stages	Length	Starters	Finishers
-	(United Kingdom) Border Counties Rally; CANCELLED	1							
-	(United Kingdom) Border Counties Rally; CANCELLED	2							
-	(United Kingdom) Border Counties Rally; CANCELLED	3							
1	(United Kingdom) Pirelli Rally (28-29 April)	1	(United Kingdom) Matt Edwards	Ford Fiesta R5	1:13:53.8	8	133.06 km	43	31
1	(United Kingdom) Pirelli Rally (28-29 April)	2	(United Kingdom) Rhys Yates	Škoda Fabia R5	1:14:14.3	8	133.06 km	43	31
1	(United Kingdom) Pirelli Rally (28-29 April)	3	(Republic of Ireland) Keith Cronin	Hyundai i20 R5	1:14:15.6	8	133.06 km	43	31
2	(Belgium) Ypres Rally (22-23 Jun)	1	(United Kingdom) Matt Edwards	Ford Fiesta R5	2:34:20.4	23	277.87 km	24	13
2	(Belgium) Ypres Rally (22-23 Jun)	2	(United Kingdom) David Bogie	Škoda Fabia R5	2:34:38.4	23	277.87 km	24	13
2	(Belgium) Ypres Rally (22-23 Jun)	3	(Republic of Ireland) Keith Cronin	Hyundai i20 R5	2:34:46.0	23	277.87 km	24	13
3	(United Kingdom) Ulster Rally (17-18 August)	1	(United Kingdom) Matt Edwards	Ford Fiesta R5	1:32:47.1	11	166.81 km	25	16
3	(United Kingdom) Ulster Rally (17-18 August)	2	(Republic of Ireland) Josh Moffett (Note: Crew was not registered to score points towards the British Rally Championship.)	Ford Fiesta R5	1:33:13.7	11	166.81 km	25	16
3	(United Kingdom) Ulster Rally (17-18 August)	3	(United Kingdom) David Bogie	Škoda Fabia R5	1:33:16.2	11	166.81 km	25	16
-	(Isle of Man) Rally Isle of Man; CANCELLED	1							
-	(Isle of Man) Rally Isle of Man; CANCELLED	2							
-	(Isle of Man) Rally Isle of Man; CANCELLED	3							
4	(United Kingdom) Wales Rally GB Leg 1 (4–5 October)	1	(United Kingdom) David Bogie	Škoda Fabia R5	1:10:57.1	9		16	15
4	(United Kingdom) Wales Rally GB Leg 1 (4–5 October)	2	(United Kingdom) Rhys Yates	Škoda Fabia R5	1:14:10.5	9		16	15
4	(United Kingdom) Wales Rally GB Leg 1 (4–5 October)	3	(United Kingdom) Matt Edwards	Ford Fiesta R5	1:16:27.6	9		16	15
5	(United Kingdom) Wales Rally GB Leg 2 (6–7 October)	1	(United Kingdom) Matt Edwards	Ford Fiesta R5	2:04:38.5	14	317.74 km	16	12
5	(United Kingdom) Wales Rally GB Leg 2 (6–7 October)	2	(United Kingdom) Alex Laffey	Ford Fiesta R5	2:10:34.5	14	317.74 km	16	12
5	(United Kingdom) Wales Rally GB Leg 2 (6–7 October)	3	(Norway) Steve Røkland	Peugeot 208 R2	2:20:42.4	14	317.74 km	16	12

== Drivers Points Classification ==
Pos	Driver	Car	BCR	PIR	YPR	ULS	IOM	GB1	GB2	Points
1	Matt Edwards	Ford Fiesta R5	-	25	25	25	-	15	25*	120
2	Alex Laffey	Ford Fiesta R5	-	8	14*	12	-	12	18	64
3	David Bogie	Skoda Fabia R5	-	Ret*	18	18	-	25	Ret	61
4	Rhys Yates	Skoda Fabia R5	-	18	Ret*	15	-	18	Ret	51
5	Steve Røkland	Peugeot 208 R2	-	2*	4	10	-	8	15	39
6	James Williams	Vauxhall Adam R2	-	DNP	11*	Ret	-	10	12	33
7	Keith Cronin	Hyundai i20 R5	-	15	15	DNP	-	DNP	DNP	30
8	Kevin Horgan	Škoda Fabia R2	-	DNP	2	6	-	Ret	11*	19
9	Martin McCormack	Škoda Fabia R5	-	12	Ret	Ret	-	DNP	DNP	12
10	Jonathan Greer	Ford Fiesta R5	-	10	DNP	Ret	-	DNP	DNP	10
Pos	Driver	Car	BCR	PIR	YPR	ULS	IOM	GB1	GB2	Pts

Key
Colour	Result
Gold	Winner
Silver	2nd place
Bronze	3rd place
Green	Non-podium finish
Purple	Did not finish (Ret)
Black	Disqualified (DSQ)
Black	Excluded (EXC)
White	Did not start (DNS)
*	Joker played

Points are awarded in each class as follows: 25, 18, 15, 12, 10, 8, 6, 4, 2, 1. Competitors may nominate one event as their 'joker', on which they will score additional points: 5, 4, 3, 2, 1. Competitors six best scores will count towards their championship total, including the final round. The final round of the championship wase a double-header for points as the rally was split into two point scoring rounds.
