= Josh McErlean =

Rally driver from Northern Ireland (born 1999)

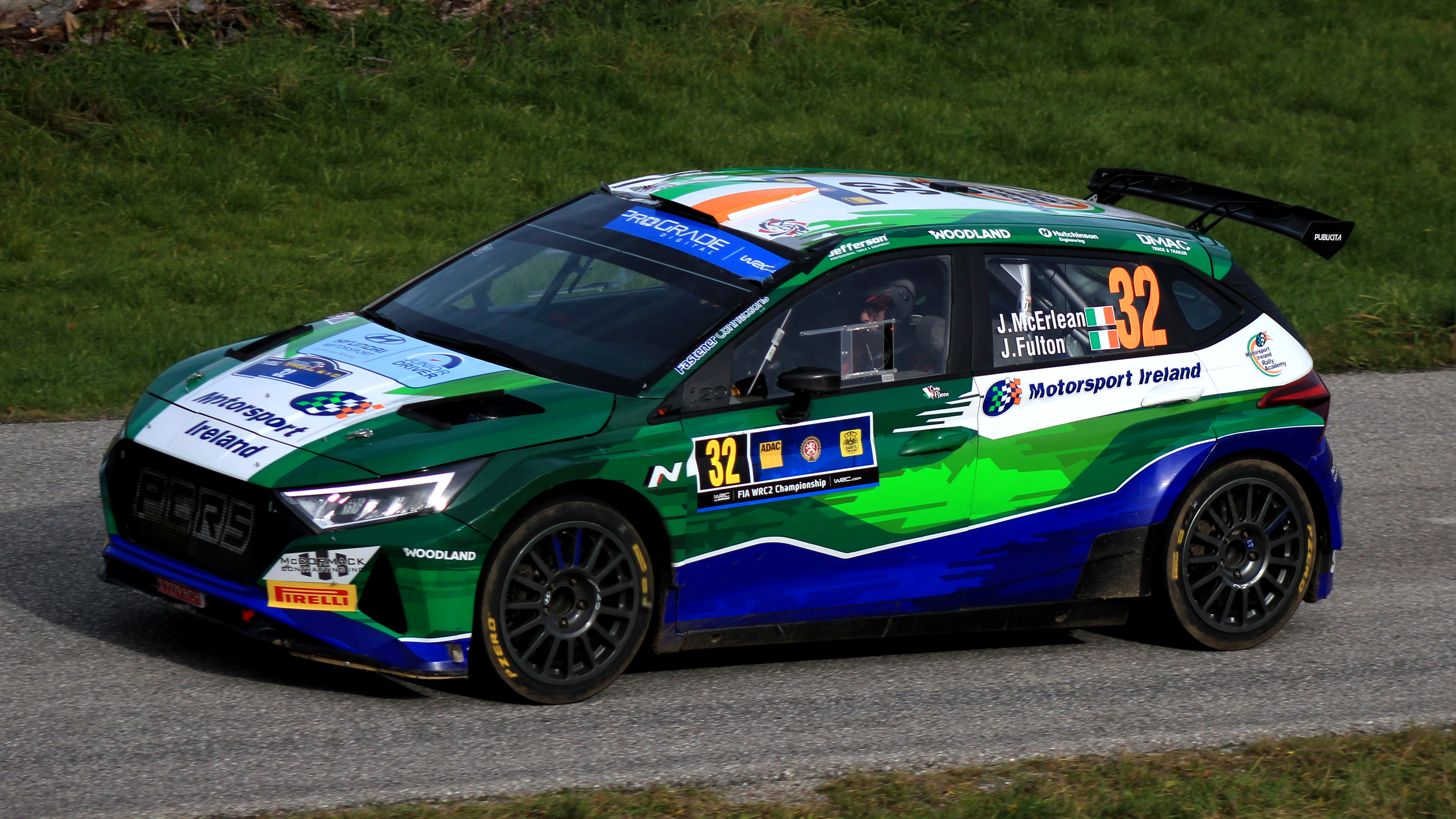
- McErlean competing in the 2023 Central European Rally

Personal information
- Nationality: (Republic of Ireland) Irish
- Full name: Joshua Patrick McErlean
- Born: 16 July 1999 (age 27); Kilrea, Northern Ireland

World Rally Championship record
- Years active: 2019–present
- Co-driver: (United Kingdom) Keaton Williams (Republic of Ireland) James Fulton (Republic of Ireland) John Rowan (Republic of Ireland) Eoin Treacy
- Teams: M-Sport Ford WRT
- Rallies: 41
- Championships: 0
- Rally wins: 0
- Podiums: 0
- Stage wins: 1
- Total points: 30
- First rally: 2019 Wales Rally GB
- Last rally: 2026 Rally Sweden

Joshua Patrick McErlean (born 16 July 1999) is a British-Irish rally driver who currently competes in the World Rally Championship for M-Sport Ford WRT.

== Rally career ==
=== Early years ===
McErlean made his rally debut in 2014. He and cousin Thomas entered the Junior Turkey Run in Northern Ireland and won on their first start, having driven a Peugeot 107. McErlean drove a full season of the Junior 1000 Rally Challenge in Northern Ireland in 2015, taking the title alongside his cousin with four rally victories. The pair returned to defend their title and duly repeated their feat, in addition to winning the Junior 1000 series in Great Britain, where they won six of their eight entered events.

In 2017, McErlean joined the British Rally Championship at the wheel of a Citroën C2 R2 Max, though reliability issues plagued his campaign and he finished ninth in the junior class standings. Having made a sole start in a Ford Fiesta R2T in July 2017, McErlean drove the car for the entirety of the 2018 season, which he finished 11th in the British Junior class with a sole class podium at the Ypres Rally.

McErlean switched cars again for 2019, piloting a Peugeot 208 R2 in the British Championship. McErlean drove a strong season, winning his class at the West Cork Rally, Pirelli International Rally, and Ulster Rally and clinching the junior title a round early, whilst also claiming third in the overall standings. With the help of Hyundai, McErlean was able to make his WRC debut, competing in the Wales Rally GB with the i20 R5. He and co-driver Keaton Williams retired on stage six with a mechanical failure.

=== Tenure with Motorsport Ireland ===
With full support by Motorsport Ireland, McErlean was scheduled to enter the British Rally Championship with Hyundai, however the season was cancelled after just one round as a result of the COVID-19 pandemic. McErlean went on to compete in the final two rounds of the European Rally Championship, before partaking in the Rally Monza in a WRC3 entry. McErlean and Williams finished seventh in class.

At the start of 2021, McErlean was inducted into the Hyundai Motorsport junior driver programme. After finishing third overall in the Olympus Rally in the US, McErlean took fifth place at his first WRC3 appearance of the year in Portugal. The other three rounds, which McErlean contested alongside James Fulton, yielded two further top-five finishes, including a third place at the Rally Catalunya. He finished ninth in the drivers' standings.

McErlean stepped up to the WRC2 in 2022, continuing on with Hyundai and Fulton. The season proved challenging, as McErlean only scored a sole top ten finish in Estonia. Nevertheless, McErlean remained at Hyundai in 2023. He began the year by making his debut at the Monte Carlo Rally alongside new co-driver John Rowan, though an exhaust issue on the second day put him out of contention. The pair withdrew from their next scheduled event in Croatia as a mark of respect for marque colleague and compatriot Craig Breen, who had been killed during a pre-event test. McErlean bounced back with a strong drive to seventh in class in Portugal, before reuniting with former co-driver Fulton from the ERC round in Latvia onwards. McErlean progressed to 26th in the WRC2 standings with three points results, while also scoring a season-best fourth at the Latvia ERC event.

In 2024, McErlean signed for Toksport to drive a Škoda Fabia RS Rally2 in the WRC2. He began his campaign by claiming his maiden podium — a second place in Portugal — and fighting for a podium again at the Rally Italia Sardegna before a puncture took him out of contention. McErlean also fought for the top positions in Poland until he crashed during the penultimate stage. During their remaining four championship-listed rallies, McErlean and Fulton never finished outside the top eight, with a best result of fifth coming in Central Europe. They also contested the Rally Japan whilst not listed for points. In the WRC2 standings, McErlean finished ninth.

=== WRC full-timer ===
In December 2024, it was announced that McErlean and Fulton would join Grégoire Munster to drive for M-Sport Ford World Rally Team in the Rally1 class of the 2025 WRC season. Having kept things clean on debut, McErlean finished seventh in Monte Carlo.

== Rally results ==
=== British Junior Rally Championship results ===
Year	Entrant	Car	1	2	3	4	5	6	7	Pos.	Points
2017	Macsport Rally Team	Citroën C2 R2	BRC; Ret	PIR; Ret	SCO; 7	YPR		ULS; Ret	IOM	9th	6
2017	MH Motorsport	Ford Fiesta R2T					NGS; Ret			9th	6
2018	MH Motorsport	Ford Fiesta R2T	PIR; Ret	YPR; 2	ULS; Ret	WAL				11th	18
2019	Macsport Rally Team	Peugeot 208 R2	CAM; 4	WCR; 1	PIR; 1	YPR; 4	ULS; 1	GHR		1st	104

=== WRC results ===
Year	Entrant	Car	1	2	3	4	5	6	7	8	9	10	11	12	13	14	Pos.	Points
2019	Josh McErlean	Hyundai i20 R5	MON	SWE	MEX	FRA	ARG	CHL	POR	ITA	FIN	GER	TUR	GBR; Ret	ESP	AUS; C	NC	0
2020	Motorsport Ireland Rally Academy	Hyundai i20 R5	MON	SWE	MEX	EST	TUR	ITA	MNZ; 17								NC	0
2021	Motorsport Ireland Rally Academy	Hyundai i20 R5	MON	ARC	CRO	POR; 17	ITA	KEN	EST	BEL; 12	GRE	FIN	ESP; 17	MNZ; 19			NC	0
2022	Motorsport Ireland Rally Academy	Hyundai i20 N Rally2	MON	SWE; 29	CRO	POR; 40	ITA; 28	KEN	EST; 19	FIN; 34	BEL; Ret	GRE	NZL	ESP; 21	JPN		NC	0
2023	Motorsport Ireland Rally Academy	Hyundai i20 N Rally2	MON; 57	SWE	MEX	CRO	POR; 12	ITA; 15	KEN	EST; 16	FIN; 19	GRE	CHL	EUR; 44	JPN		NC	0
2024	Toksport WRT 2	Škoda Fabia RS Rally2	MON	SWE	KEN	CRO	POR; 9	ITA; 13	POL; Ret	LAT; 21	FIN; 12	GRE; 9	CHL	EUR; 11	JPN; 30		27th	2
2025	M-Sport Ford WRT	Ford Puma Rally1	MON; 7	SWE; 46	KEN; 10	ESP; Ret	POR; 8	ITA; 34	GRE; 12	EST; 9	FIN; 7	PAR; 29	CHL; 37	EUR; 7	JPN; Ret	SAU; 9	11th	28
2026	M-Sport Ford WRT	Ford Puma Rally1	MON; Ret	SWE; 9	KEN; Ret	CRO; 15	ESP; 8	POR; 18	JPN; 10	GRE; 6	EST; 43	FIN; 7	PAR; 6	CHL; 7	ITA; 22		9th	35

- * Season still in progress.

=== WRC-2 results ===
Year	Entrant	Car	1	2	3	4	5	6	7	8	9	10	11	12	13	Pos.	Points
2022	Motorsport Ireland Rally Academy	Hyundai i20 N Rally2	MON	SWE; 13	CRO	POR; 19	ITA; 20	KEN	EST; 8	FIN; 13	BEL; Ret	GRE	NZL	ESP; 11	JPN	45th	4
2023	Motorsport Ireland Rally Academy	Hyundai i20 N Rally2	MON; 22	SWE	MEX	CRO	POR; 7	ITA; 10	KEN	EST; 8	FIN; 12	GRE	CHL	EUR; 19	JPN	26th	11
2024	Toksport WRT 2	Škoda Fabia RS Rally2	MON	SWE	KEN	CRO	POR; 2	ITA; 8	POL; Ret	LAT; 8	FIN; 6	GRE; 6	CHL	EUR; 5	JPN	9th	50

=== WRC-3 results ===
Year	Entrant	Car	1	2	3	4	5	6	7	8	9	10	11	12	Pos.	Points
2020	Motorsport Ireland Rally Academy	Hyundai i20 R5	MON	SWE	MEX	EST	TUR	ITA	MNZ; 7						26th	6
2021	Motorsport Ireland Rally Academy	Hyundai i20 R5	MON	ARC	CRO	POR; 5	ITA	KEN	EST	BEL; 5	GRE	FIN	ESP; 3	MNZ; 6	9th	46

=== ERC results ===
Year	Entrant	Car	1	2	3	4	5	6	7	8	Pos.	Points
2020	Motorsport Ireland Rally Academy	Hyundai i20 R5	ITA	LAT	PRT	HUN; 11	ESP; 19				30th	5
2021	Motorsport Ireland Rally Academy	Hyundai i20 R5	POL	LAT	ITA; Ret	CZE	PRT1	PRT2	HUN	ESP	NC	0
2023	Motorsport Ireland Rally Academy	Hyundai i20 N Rally2	PRT; 19	CAN	POL; 7	LAT; 4	SWE; 31	ITA	CZE; 12	HUN; Ret	13th	39
