= 2017 British Rally Championship =

The 2017 MSA British Rally Championship was the 58th season of the British Rally Championship. It featuredure eight classes:

- BRC 1 (R5, R4, Super 2000, Regional Rally Car)
- BRC Production Cup (N4)
- BRC 3 (R3)
- BRC 4 (R2)
- National Rally Cup (open class)
- Junior BRC (R2, drivers under 26 years old)
- Cadet Cup (R2, drivers under 25 years old)
- Ladies BRC Trophy

== Calendar ==
The 2017 championship was contested over seven rounds For the first time, Ypres Rally, a Belgian event, was featured on the calendar.

Seven events were held on tarmac and gravel surfaces:

Round	Dates	Event	Rally HQ	Surface	Website
1	17–18 March	(United Kingdom) Border Counties Rally	Jedburgh	Gravel	(website)
2	29–30 April	(United Kingdom) Pirelli Rally	Carlisle, Cumbria	Gravel	(website)
3	19–20 May	(United Kingdom) RSAC Scottish Rally	Dumfries	Gravel	(website)
4	23–24 June	(Belgium) Ypres Rally	Ypres	Tarmac	(website)
5	8–9 July	(United Kingdom) Nicky Grist Stages	Builth Wells	Gravel	(website)
6	18–19 August	(United Kingdom) Ulster Rally	Derry	Tarmac	(website)
7	14–16 September	Rally Isle of Man	Douglas, Isle of Man	Tarmac	(website)

== Team and Drivers ==
BRC1 Entries

Constructor	Car	Team	Driver	Co Driver	Rounds
Škoda	Škoda Fabia R5	(United Kingdom) CA1 Sport Ltd	(United Kingdom) David Bogie	(United Kingdom) Kevin Rae	1–4
Škoda	Škoda Fabia R5	(United Kingdom) CA1 Sport Ltd	(Sweden) Fredrik Åhlin	(Norway) Torstein Eriksen	All
Škoda	Škoda Fabia R5	(United Kingdom) CA1 Sport Ltd	(United Kingdom) Thomas Preston	(United Kingdom) Andrew Roughead	2, 4
Škoda	Škoda Fabia R5	(United Kingdom) CA1 Sport Ltd	(United Kingdom) Thomas Preston	(United Kingdom) Stuart Loudon	5
Škoda	Škoda Fabia R5	(Republic of Ireland) Macsport Rally Team	(United Kingdom) Desi Henry	(Republic of Ireland) Liam Moynihan	1–4, 6
Škoda	Škoda Fabia R5	(United Kingdom) Tiger Risk Rally Team	(United Kingdom) Martin McCormack	(Republic of Ireland) David Moynihan	1–4, 6
Ford	Ford Fiesta R5	(United Kingdom) Dom Buckley Motorsport	(United Kingdom) Tom Cave	(United Kingdom) James Morgan	1
Ford	Ford Fiesta R5	(United Kingdom) Dom Buckley Motorsport	(United Kingdom) Garry Pearson	(United Kingdom) Paula Swinscoe	2
Ford	Ford Fiesta R5	(United Kingdom) Dom Buckley Motorsport	(Republic of Ireland) Barry Mckenna	(Republic of Ireland) Leon Jordan	5
Ford	Ford Fiesta R5	(United Kingdom) M-Sport World Rally Team	(Republic of Ireland) Keith Cronin	(Republic of Ireland) Mikie Galvin	All
Ford	Ford Fiesta R5	(United Kingdom) M-Sport World Rally Team	(United Kingdom) Alex Laffey	(United Kingdom) Dai Roberts	1–2
Ford	Ford Fiesta R5	(United Kingdom) M-Sport World Rally Team	(United Kingdom) Alex Laffey	(United Kingdom) Patrick Walsh	3–7
Ford	Ford Fiesta R5	(United Kingdom) Spencer Sport	(United Kingdom) Osian Pryce	(United Kingdom) Dale Furniss	1–6
Ford	Ford Fiesta R5	(United Kingdom) Euan Thorburn Rally Team	(United Kingdom) Euan Thorburn	(United Kingdom) Paul Beaton	1, 3
Ford	Ford Fiesta R5	(United Kingdom) CA1 Sport Ltd	(United Kingdom) Jamie Anderson	(United Kingdom) Ross Whittock	1–5
Ford	Ford Fiesta R5	(United Kingdom) CA1 Sport Ltd	(United Kingdom) Rhys Yates	(United Kingdom) Andrew Roughead	7
Ford	Ford Fiesta R5	(United Kingdom) Swift Group	(United Kingdom) Matt Edwards	(United Kingdom) Darren Garrod	All
Ford	Ford Fiesta R5	(United Kingdom) Brettex Site Services	(United Kingdom) Rhys Yates	(United Kingdom) Carl Williamson	1–5
Ford	Ford Fiesta R5	(United Kingdom) Brettex Site Services	(United Kingdom) Rhys Yates	(United Kingdom) Alex Lee	6
Ford	Ford Fiesta R5	(United Kingdom) Autotek Motorsport	(Norway) Eyvind Brynildsen	(Sweden) Anders Fredriksson	2
Ford	Ford Fiesta R5	(United Kingdom) Tiger Risk Rally Team	(United Kingdom) James Slaughter	(Republic of Ireland) Niall Burns	2, 4–5
Ford	Ford Fiesta R5	(United Kingdom) Tiger Risk Rally Team	(United Kingdom) Martin McCormack	(Republic of Ireland) David Moynihan	5
Citroën	Citroën DS3 R5	(United Kingdom) DGM Sport	(United Kingdom) Jonathan Greer	(United Kingdom) Kirsty Riddick	1–4, 6
Hyundai	Hyundai i20 R5	(Italy) BRC Racing Team	(United Kingdom) Tom Cave	(United Kingdom) James Morgan	2
Hyundai	Hyundai i20 R5	(South Korea) Hyundai Motorsport	(United Kingdom) Tom Cave	(United Kingdom) James Morgan	3
Hyundai	Hyundai i20 R5	(United Kingdom) Dom Buckley Motorsport	(United Kingdom) Tom Cave	(United Kingdom) James Morgan	4

BRC Production Cup Entries

Constructor	Car	Team	Driver	Co Driver	Rounds
Subaru	Subaru Impreza WRX STI	(United Kingdom) SW Motorsport	(United Kingdom) Spencer Wilkinson	(United Kingdom) Glyn Thomas	1–3

BRC4 Entries

Constructor	Car	Team	Driver	Co Driver	Rounds
Ford	Ford Fiesta R2T	(United Kingdom) Atherton Racing	(United Kingdom) Gee Atherton	(United Kingdom) Keaton Williams	1, 3, 5, 7
Ford	Ford Fiesta R2	(United Kingdom) Two 4 Motorsport	(United Kingdom) David White	(United Kingdom) Matthew White	1–2, 4–7

Junior BRC Entries

Constructor	Car	Team	Driver	Co Driver	Rounds
Peugeot	Peugeot 208 R2	(Republic of Ireland) Mc Connell Motorsport	(Republic of Ireland) Marty Gallagher	(Republic of Ireland) Dean O'Sullivan	All
Peugeot	Peugeot 208 R2	(United Kingdom) Melvyn Evans Motorsport	(United Kingdom) Meirion Evans	(United Kingdom) Jonathan Jackson	All
Peugeot	Peugeot 208 R2	(Republic of Ireland) Dean Raftery Rallying	(Republic of Ireland) Dean Raftery	(United Kingdom) Tom Woodburn	1
Peugeot	Peugeot 208 R2	(United Kingdom) Peugeot UK	(United Kingdom) Cameron Davies	(United Kingdom) Caron Tomlinson	1–4
Peugeot	Peugeot 208 R2	(United Kingdom) Peugeot UK	(United Kingdom) Cameron Davies	(United Kingdom) Michael Gilbey	5
Peugeot	Peugeot 208 R2	(United Kingdom) DGM Sport	(United Kingdom) William Creighton	(United Kingdom) Liam Regan	All
Ford	Ford Fiesta R2T	(United Kingdom) MH Motorsport	(United Kingdom) Callum Devine	(Republic of Ireland) Keith Moriarty	1–3
Ford	Ford Fiesta R2T	(United Kingdom) MH Motorsport	(Norway) Oscar Solberg	(Sweden) Patrik Barth	All
Ford	Ford Fiesta R2T	(United Kingdom) MH Motorsport	(United Kingdom) Josh McErlean	(United Kingdom) Aaron Johnston	5
Ford	Ford Fiesta R2T	(United Kingdom) Spencer Sport	(United Kingdom) James Williams	(United Kingdom) Phil Hall	1
Ford	Ford Fiesta R2T	(United Kingdom) Spencer Sport	(United Kingdom) James Williams	(United Kingdom) Dale Bowen	2
Ford	Ford Fiesta R2T	(United Kingdom) Spencer Sport	(United Kingdom) James Williams	(United Kingdom) Dai Roberts	3–6
Vauxhall	Vauxhall Adam R2	(United Kingdom) Vauxhall Motorsport Junior Rally Team	(Australia) Arron Windus	(United Kingdom) Aaron Johnston	1
Vauxhall	Vauxhall Adam R2	(United Kingdom) Spencer Sport	(United Kingdom) James Williams	(United Kingdom) Dai Roberts	7
Citroën	Citroën C2 R2	(Republic of Ireland) Macsport Rally Team	(United Kingdom) Josh McErlean	(United Kingdom) Damien Duffin	1–2, 6
Citroën	Citroën C2 R2	(Republic of Ireland) Macsport Rally Team	(United Kingdom) Josh McErlean	(United Kingdom) Aaron Johnston	3
Opel	Opel Adam R2	(Germany) Opel Rallye Junior Team	(United Kingdom) Chris Ingram	(United Kingdom) Elliot Edmondson	4
Opel	Opel Adam R2	(United Kingdom) Callum Devine Rallying	(United Kingdom) Callum Devine	(Republic of Ireland) Keith Moriarty	4–7

Cadet Cup Entries

Constructor	Car	Team	Driver	Co Driver	Rounds
Ford	Ford Fiesta R2	(United Kingdom) Armstrong Motorsport	(United Kingdom) Fergus Barlow	(United Kingdom) Max Freeman	1–3
Ford	Ford Fiesta R2	(United Kingdom) MH Motorsport	(United Kingdom) Josh Cornwell	(United Kingdom) Richard Bliss	1–5
Ford	Ford Fiesta R2	(United Kingdom) MH Motorsport	(United Kingdom) Josh Cornwell	(United Kingdom) Tom Woodburn	6
Ford	Ford Fiesta R2	(United Kingdom) MH Motorsport	(United Kingdom) Alex Waterman	(United Kingdom) Harry Thomas	1–2, 4–7
Ford	Ford Fiesta R2	(United Kingdom) MH Motorsport	(United Kingdom) Alex Waterman	(United Kingdom) Tom Woodburn	3
Ford	Ford Fiesta R2	(United Kingdom) MH Motorsport	(United Kingdom) Nabila Tejpar	(United Kingdom) Charley Sayer	1–3
Ford	Ford Fiesta R2	(United Kingdom) MH Motorsport	(United Kingdom) Nabila Tejpar	(United Kingdom) Steve McPhee	4–5
Ford	Ford Fiesta R2	(United Kingdom) MH Motorsport	(United Kingdom) Nabila Tejpar	(United Kingdom) Richard Bliss	6–7
Ford	Ford Fiesta R2	(United Kingdom) Tom Williams Rallying	(United Kingdom) Tom Williams	(United Kingdom) Bryan Hull	1–5
Ford	Ford Fiesta R2	(United Kingdom) Tom Williams Rallying	(United Kingdom) Tom Williams	(United Kingdom) Phil Hall	7
Ford	Ford Fiesta R2T	(United Kingdom) Haper Adams Motorsport	(United Kingdom) James McDiarmid	(United Kingdom) Max Haines	1–2, 4–7
Vauxhall	Vauxhall Adam Cup	(United Kingdom) Major Motorsport	(Australia) Arron Windus	(United Kingdom) Richard Crozier	2–3

Ladies BRC Trophy Entries

Constructor	Car	Team	Driver	Co Driver	Rounds
Ford	Ford Fiesta R2	(United Kingdom) MH Motorsport	(United Kingdom) Nabila Tejpar	(United Kingdom) Charley Sayer	1–3
Ford	Ford Fiesta R2	(United Kingdom) MH Motorsport	(United Kingdom) Nabila Tejpar	(United Kingdom) Steve McPhee	4–5
Ford	Ford Fiesta R2	(United Kingdom) MH Motorsport	(United Kingdom) Nabila Tejpar	(United Kingdom) Richard Bliss	6–7

=== Calendar changes ===
On 7 January, the British Rally Championship management team announced via a press release that the 2017 Mid Wales Stages Rally, usually the opening round of the championship and held in March, would not take place. The reason cited was that a deal had been reached with Natural Resources Wales - the agency that runs Welsh government forests - over the fees payable to run a forest rally in Wales however a misunderstanding over the VAT payable meant that it would be unfeasible to run the 2017 event. The Border Counties Rally, based in Jedburgh and also round two of the Scottish Rally Championship was announced as a replacement event and the 2017 series opener.

== Event results ==
Podium places and information on each event.

Round	Rally name	Podium finishers				Statistics			
Round	Rally name	Rank	Driver	Car	Time	Stages	Length	Starters	Finishers
1	(United Kingdom) Border Counties Rally (17-18 March)	1	(Sweden) Fredrik Åhlin	Škoda Fabia R5	0:53:01.6	9	93.94 km	35	28
1	(United Kingdom) Border Counties Rally (17-18 March)	2	(United Kingdom) Tom Cave	Ford Fiesta R5	0:53:40.2	9	93.94 km	35	28
1	(United Kingdom) Border Counties Rally (17-18 March)	3	(United Kingdom) Osian Pryce	Ford Fiesta R5	0:54:09.0	9	93.94 km	35	28
2	(United Kingdom) Pirelli Rally (29-30 April)	1	(Sweden) Fredrik Åhlin	Škoda Fabia R5	1:29:28.0	8	159.61 km	43	30
2	(United Kingdom) Pirelli Rally (29-30 April)	2	(United Kingdom) Osian Pryce	Ford Fiesta R5	1:30:07.4	8	159.61 km	43	30
2	(United Kingdom) Pirelli Rally (29-30 April)	3	(United Kingdom) Martin McCormack	Škoda Fabia R5	1:30:17.5	8	159.61 km	43	30
3	(United Kingdom) RSAC Scottish Rally (19-20 May)	1	(United Kingdom) David Bogie	Škoda Fabia R5	1:09:47.1	10	119.58 km	37	27
3	(United Kingdom) RSAC Scottish Rally (19-20 May)	2	(United Kingdom) Osian Pryce	Ford Fiesta R5	1:10:35.6	10	119.58 km	37	27
3	(United Kingdom) RSAC Scottish Rally (19-20 May)	3	(United Kingdom) Martin McCormack	Škoda Fabia R5	1:10:49.0	10	119.58 km	37	27
4	(Belgium) Ypres Rally (23–24 June)	1	(Republic of Ireland) Keith Cronin	Ford Fiesta R5	2:25:00.3	20	259.35 km	123	90
4	(Belgium) Ypres Rally (23–24 June)	2	(United Kingdom) Matt Edwards	Ford Fiesta R5	2:26:18.4	20	259.35 km	123	90
4	(Belgium) Ypres Rally (23–24 June)	3	(United Kingdom) Osian Pryce	Ford Fiesta R5	2:27:30.2	20	259.35 km	123	90
5	(United Kingdom) Nicky Grist Stages (8-9 July)	1	(Sweden) Fredrik Åhlin	Škoda Fabia R5	1:45:50.2	20	188.48 km	28	17
5	(United Kingdom) Nicky Grist Stages (8-9 July)	2	(United Kingdom) Matt Edwards	Ford Fiesta R5	1:46:37.7	20	188.48 km	28	17
5	(United Kingdom) Nicky Grist Stages (8-9 July)	3	(United Kingdom) Rhys Yates	Ford Fiesta R5	1:47:58.2	20	188.48 km	28	17
6	(United Kingdom) Ulster Rally (18-19 August)	1	(Republic of Ireland) Keith Cronin	Ford Fiesta R5	2:06:03.8	14	214.83 km	33	22
6	(United Kingdom) Ulster Rally (18-19 August)	2	(Sweden) Fredrik Åhlin	Škoda Fabia R5	2:06:59.2	14	214.83 km	33	22
6	(United Kingdom) Ulster Rally (18-19 August)	3	(United Kingdom) Jonathan Greer	Citroën DS3 R5	2:08:11.8	14	214.83 km	33	22
7	Rally Isle of Man (14-16 September)	1	(Republic of Ireland) Keith Cronin	Ford Fiesta R5	1:51:16.0	21	229.82 km	23	17
7	Rally Isle of Man (14-16 September)	2	(United Kingdom) Matt Edwards	Ford Fiesta R5	1:51:38.6	21	229.82 km	23	17
7	Rally Isle of Man (14-16 September)	3	(Sweden) Fredrik Åhlin	Škoda Fabia R5	1:52:29.2	21	229.82 km	23	17

== Drivers championship standings ==
Top 10 positions

Pos	Driver	BCR (United Kingdom)	PIR (United Kingdom)	SCO (United Kingdom)	YPR (Belgium)	NGS (United Kingdom)	ULS	MAN (Isle of Man)	Pts
1	(Republic of Ireland) Keith Cronin	4	Ret	4	1	Ret	1	1*	129
2	(Sweden) Fredrik Åhlin	1	1*	Ret	6	1	2	3	128
3	(United Kingdom) Matt Edwards	6	5	Ret	2	2	Ret	2*	94
4	(United Kingdom) Rhys Yates	5	6	Ret	5	3*	Ret	4	70
5	(United Kingdom) Osian Pryce	3	2	2	3	Ret*	Ret	DNP	66
6	(United Kingdom) Martin McCormack	Ret	3	3	Ret*	4	4	DNP	57
7	(United Kingdom) Jamie Anderson	7	8	7	4	5*	DNP	DNP	39
8	(United Kingdom) David Bogie	Ret*	4	1	Ret	DNP	DNP	DNP	37
9	(United Kingdom) Alex Laffey	Ret	9	8	8	Ret*	5	Ret	30
10	(United Kingdom) Callum Devine	14	11	13	7	6	Ret*	6	30
Pos	Driver	BCR (United Kingdom)	PIR (United Kingdom)	SCO (United Kingdom)	YPR (Belgium)	NGS (United Kingdom)	ULS	MAN (Isle of Man)	Pts

Key
Colour	Result
Gold	Winner
Silver	2nd place
Bronze	3rd place
Green	Non-podium finish
Purple	Did not finish (Ret)
Black	Disqualified (DSQ)
Black	Excluded (EXC)
White	Did not start (DNS)
*	Joker played

Points are awarded in each class as follows: 25, 18, 15, 12, 10, 8, 6, 4, 2, 1. Competitors may nominate one event as their 'joker', on which they will score additional points: 5, 4, 3, 2, 1. Competitors six best scores will count towards their championship total, including the final round. The final round of the championship will be a double-header for points as the rally is split into two point scoring rounds.
