= Connor Woods =

Connor Woods may refer to:

- Connor Woods (footballer) (born 1998), see 2022–23 Northern Premier League
- Connor Woods (rally driver), see 2018 British Rally Championship

== See also ==
- Connor Wood
- Conor Woods, Hurler, see 2012 Interprovincial Hurling Championship
