= 2019 British Rally Championship =

The 2019 MSA British Rally Championship will be the 61st season of the series, the premier rally competition in the UK.

The championship will feature eight classes:

- BRC 1 (R5, R4, Super 2000, Regional Rally Car)
- BRC Production Cup (N4)
- BRC 3 (R3)
- BRC 4 (R2)
- National Rally Cup (open class)
- Junior BRC (R2, drivers under 26 years old)
- Cadet Cup (R2, drivers under 25 years old)
- Ladies BRC Trophy

== Calendar ==
The 2019 championship will be contested over six rounds in six different territories England, Scotland, Wales, Northern Ireland, Ireland and Belgium. The Wales Rally GB has been added as a reserve event. The events will be held on both tarmac and gravel surfaces.

- Calendar subject to approval by the MSA

Round	Dates	Event	Rally HQ	Surface	Website
1	16 February	Cambrian Rally	Llandudno, Wales	Gravel	(website)
2	16-17 March	West Cork Rally	Clonakilty, Republic of Ireland	Tarmac	(website)
3	27 April	Pirelli International Rally	Carlisle, England	Gravel	(website)
4	28-29 June	Ypres Rally	Ypres, Belgium	Tarmac	(website)
5	17 August	Ulster Rally	Antrim, Northern Ireland	Tarmac	(website)
6	14 September	Galloway Hills Rally	Dalbeattie, Scotland	Gravel	(website)
Reserve	TBC	Wales Rally GB	Deeside	Gravel	(website)

== Team and Drivers ==
BRC1 Entries

Constructor	Car	Team	Driver	Co Driver	Rounds
Ford	Ford Fiesta R5	(United Kingdom) M-Sport Ford World Rally Team	(Chile) Pedro Heller	(Spain) Marc Martí	1
Ford	Ford Fiesta R5	(United Kingdom) M-Sport Ford World Rally Team	(Chile) Alberto Heller	(Argentina) José Luis Díaz	1
Ford	Ford Fiesta R5	(United Kingdom) M-Sport Ford World Rally Team	(United Kingdom) Matt Edwards	(United Kingdom) Patrick Walsh	All
Ford	Ford Fiesta R5	(United Kingdom) M-Sport Ford World Rally Team	(United Kingdom) Alex Laffey	(United Kingdom) Stuart Loudon	All
Ford	Ford Fiesta R5	(Republic of Ireland) Combilift Rallying	(Republic of Ireland) Josh Moffett	(Republic of Ireland) Keith Moriarty	1–2, 5
Ford	Ford Fiesta R5	(United Kingdom) DGM Sport	(United Kingdom) Jonathan Greer	(United Kingdom) Kirsty Riddick	1–2, 5
Ford	Ford Fiesta R5	(United Kingdom) DGM Sport	(United Kingdom) Jonathan Greer	(United Kingdom) Dai Roberts	6
Ford	Ford Fiesta R5	(United Kingdom) SW Motorsport	(United Kingdom) Sacha Kakad	(United Kingdom) James Aldridge	1–2
Ford	Ford Fiesta R5	(Republic of Ireland) PCRS Rallysport	(United States) Enda McCormack	(Republic of Ireland) Paul Sheridan	1
Ford	Ford Fiesta R5	(Republic of Ireland) PCRS Rallysport	(United States) Enda McCormack	(Republic of Ireland) Colin Fitzgerald	2–3
Ford	Ford Fiesta R5	(Republic of Ireland) PCRS Rallysport	(United States) Enda McCormack	(Republic of Ireland) Tommy Doyle	4
Ford	Ford Fiesta R5	(United Kingdom) Swift Group	(United Kingdom) Mat Smith	(United Kingdom) Giles Dykes	3
Hyundai	Hyundai i20 R5	(Republic of Ireland) PCRS Rallysport	(United Kingdom) Tom Cave	(United Kingdom) Dale Bowen	1, 3–6
Hyundai	Hyundai i20 R5	(Republic of Ireland) PCRS Rallysport	(United Kingdom) Tom Cave	(United Kingdom) James Morgan	2
Hyundai	Hyundai i20 R5	(Republic of Ireland) PCRS Rallysport	(United Kingdom) Alan Carmichael	(United Kingdom) Claire Williams	1–2, 6
Hyundai	Hyundai i20 R5	(Republic of Ireland) PCRS Rallysport	(United Kingdom) Alan Carmichael	(United Kingdom) Ivor Lamont	5
Hyundai	Hyundai i20 R5	(Republic of Ireland) PCRS Rallysport	(United Kingdom) James Wilson	(Republic of Ireland) Arthur Kierans	5–6
Hyundai	Hyundai i20 R5	(Republic of Ireland) PCRS Rallysport	(United States) Enda McCormack	(Republic of Ireland) Colin Fitzgerald	6
Hyundai	Hyundai i20 R5	(United Kingdom) Melvyn Evans Motorsport	(United Kingdom) Meirion Evans	(United Kingdom) Jonathan Jackson	1–2
Škoda	Škoda Fabia R5	(United Kingdom) CA1 Sport Ltd	(United Kingdom) David Bogie	(Republic of Ireland) John Rowan	1–3
Škoda	Škoda Fabia R5	(United Kingdom) CA1 Sport Ltd	(United Kingdom) Thomas Preston	(United Kingdom) Andrew Roughead	1
Škoda	Škoda Fabia R5	(United Kingdom) CA1 Sport Ltd	(United Kingdom) Rhys Yates	(United Kingdom) James Morgan	3–4
Škoda	Škoda Fabia R5	(United Kingdom) Dom Buckley Motorsport	(United Kingdom) Martin McCormack	(United Kingdom) Barney Mitchell	1–5
Škoda	Škoda Fabia R5	(Republic of Ireland) Macsport Rally Team	(United Kingdom) Desi Henry	(Republic of Ireland) Liam Moynihan	1–3
Škoda	Škoda Fabia R5	(Republic of Ireland) Gerry Cumiskey Volkswagen	(Republic of Ireland) Brendan Cumiskey	(Republic of Ireland) Ronan O'Kane	1–2
Škoda	Škoda Fabia R5	(United Kingdom) Melvyn Evans Motorsport	(United Kingdom) Meirion Evans	(United Kingdom) Jonathan Jackson	5

Junior BRC Entries

Constructor	Car	Team	Driver	Co Driver	Rounds
Ford	Ford Fiesta R2T	(United Kingdom) EDSL Sport	(United Kingdom) James Williams	(United Kingdom) Tom Woodburn	1, 4–6
Ford	Ford Fiesta R2T	(United Kingdom) EDSL Sport	(United Kingdom) Jordan Reynolds	(United Kingdom) Peredur Davies	1–2
Ford	Ford Fiesta R2T	(United Kingdom) EDSL Sport	(United Kingdom) Ruairi Bell	(United Kingdom) Darren Garrod	All
Ford	Ford Fiesta R2T	(United Kingdom) EDSL Sport	(Republic of Ireland) Jordan Hone	(Republic of Ireland) Aileen Kelly	3
Ford	Ford Fiesta R2T	(United Kingdom) EDSL Sport	(Republic of Ireland) Marty Gallagher	(Republic of Ireland) Dean O'Sullivan	4–6
Ford	Ford Fiesta R2T	(United Kingdom) Finlay Retson Motorsport	(United Kingdom) Finlay Retson	(United Kingdom) Tom Hynd	1
Ford	Ford Fiesta R2T	(United Kingdom) Finlay Retson Motorsport	(United Kingdom) Finlay Retson	(United Kingdom) Richard Crozier	2–6
Ford	Ford Fiesta R2T	(United Kingdom) Myerscough College Motorsport	(United Kingdom) Bart Lang	(United Kingdom) Sinclair Young	1–5
Peugeot	Peugeot 208 R2	(United Kingdom) DGM Sport	(United Kingdom) William Creighton	(Republic of Ireland) Liam Regan	All
Peugeot	Peugeot 208 R2	(Republic of Ireland) Macsport Rally Team	(United Kingdom) Josh McErlean	(Republic of Ireland) Gerard Conway	1
Peugeot	Peugeot 208 R2	(Republic of Ireland) Macsport Rally Team	(United Kingdom) Josh McErlean	(United Kingdom) Keaton Williams	2–5
Peugeot	Peugeot 208 R2	(Republic of Ireland) PCRS Rallysport	(United Kingdom) James Wilson	(Republic of Ireland) Arthur Kierans	1–4
Peugeot	Peugeot 208 R2	(Republic of Ireland) Mc Connell Motorsport	(Republic of Ireland) Marty Gallagher	(Republic of Ireland) Dean O'Sullivan	1–3
Peugeot	Peugeot 208 R2	(United Kingdom) Complete Cleaning	(United Kingdom) Scott Sloan	(United Kingdom) David Sloan	1–3
Peugeot	Peugeot 208 R2	(United Kingdom) Allied Polymer	(United Kingdom) Nabila Tejpar	(United Kingdom) Max Freeman	1–2
Peugeot	Peugeot 208 R2	(United Kingdom) Jordan Reynolds Rallying	(United Kingdom) Jordan Reynolds	(United Kingdom) Peredur Davies	4
Opel	Opel Adam R2	(United Kingdom) Jordan Hone Rallying	(Republic of Ireland) Jordan Hone	(Republic of Ireland) Aileen Kelly	1–2, 4–5
Opel	Opel Adam R2	(United Kingdom) Jordan Hone Rallying	(Republic of Ireland) Jordan Hone	(Republic of Ireland) Paul Hone	6
Vauxhall	Vauxhall Adam R2	(United Kingdom) HT Instalallations / Network Q	(United Kingdom) James Williams	(United Kingdom) Tom Woodburn	2

Cadet Cup Entries

Constructor	Car	Team	Driver	Co Driver	Rounds
Ford	Ford Fiesta R2	(United Kingdom) EDSL Sport	(United Kingdom) Rupert Flynn	(United Kingdom) Peredur Davies	5

Ladies BRC Trophy Entries

Constructor	Car	Team	Driver	Co Driver	Rounds
Peugeot	Peugeot 208 R2	(United Kingdom) Allied Polymer	(United Kingdom) Nabila Tejpar	(United Kingdom) Max Freeman	1–2

== Event results ==
Podium places and information on each event.

Round	Rally name	Podium finishers				Statistics			
Round	Rally name	Rank	Driver	Car	Time	Stages	Length - km	Starters	Finishers
1	(United Kingdom) Cambrian Rally; 16 February	1	(United Kingdom) Matt Edwards	Ford Fiesta R5	54:58.7	10	84.20	30	22
1	(United Kingdom) Cambrian Rally; 16 February	2	(United Kingdom) David Bogie	Škoda Fabia R5	55:25.2	10	84.20	30	22
1	(United Kingdom) Cambrian Rally; 16 February	3	(United Kingdom) Martin McCormack	Škoda Fabia R5	56:06.7	10	84.20	30	22
2	(Republic of Ireland) West Cork Rally; 16-17 March	1	(Republic of Ireland) Craig Breen (Note: Crew was not registered to score points towards the British Rally Championship.)	Ford Fiesta R5	1:51:18.6	15	217.9	23	17
2	(Republic of Ireland) West Cork Rally; 16-17 March	2	(United Kingdom) Alister Fisher	Ford Fiesta R5	1:51:40.8	15	217.9	23	17
2	(Republic of Ireland) West Cork Rally; 16-17 March	3	(United Kingdom) Tom Cave	Hyundai i20 R5	1:51:55.9	15	217.9	23	17
3	(United Kingdom) Pirelli International Rally; 27 April	1	(United Kingdom) Tom Cave	Hyundai i20 R5	57:34.4	6	100.89	15	10
3	(United Kingdom) Pirelli International Rally; 27 April	2	(United Kingdom) Rhys Yates	Škoda Fabia R5	57:52.0	6	100.89	15	10
3	(United Kingdom) Pirelli International Rally; 27 April	3	(Finland) Jari Huttunen	Hyundai i20 R5	58:35.0	6	100.89	15	10
4	(Belgium) Ypres Rally; 28-29 June	1	(United Kingdom) Matt Edwards	Ford Fiesta R5	2:32:12.4	23	277.88	15	7
4	(Belgium) Ypres Rally; 28-29 June	2	(United Kingdom) Tom Cave	Hyundai i20 R5	2:33:08.5	23	277.88	15	7
4	(Belgium) Ypres Rally; 28-29 June	3	(United Kingdom) Alex Laffey	Ford Fiesta R5	2:36:18.1	23	277.88	15	7
5	(United Kingdom) Ulster Rally; 17 August	1	(Republic of Ireland) Craig Breen	Hyundai i20 R5	1:25:08.3	9	150.92	18	7
5	(United Kingdom) Ulster Rally; 17 August	2	(United Kingdom) Matt Edwards	Ford Fiesta R5	1:25:28.8	9	150.92	18	7
5	(United Kingdom) Ulster Rally; 17 August	3	(Republic of Ireland) Callum Devine	Ford Fiesta R5	1:25:50.2	9	150.92	18	7
6	(United Kingdom) Galloway Hills Rally; 14 September	1	(United Kingdom) Tom Cave	Hyundai i20 R5	1:02:09.7	9	115.47	22	17
6	(United Kingdom) Galloway Hills Rally; 14 September	2	(United Kingdom) Jonathan Greer	Ford Fiesta R5	1:03:04.6	9	115.47	22	17
6	(United Kingdom) Galloway Hills Rally; 14 September	3	(United Kingdom) Matt Edwards	Ford Fiesta R5	1:04:25.8	9	115.47	22	17

== Drivers Points Classification ==
=== Scoring system ===
Points are awarded as follows: 25, 18, 15, 12, 10, 8, 6, 4, 2, 1. Drivers may nominate one event as their 'joker', on which they will score additional points: 5, 4, 3, 2, 1. Competitors five best scores will count towards their championship total.

Position	1st	2nd	3rd	4th	5th	6th	7th	8th	9th	10th
Points	25	18	15	12	10	8	6	4	2	1
Joker Points	5	4	3	2	1					

=== British Rally Championship for Drivers ===
Pos	Driver	Car	CAM	WCR	PIR	YPR	ULS	GHR	Points
1	Matt Edwards	Ford Fiesta R5	25	18	EXC	25	25	18*	111
2	Tom Cave	Hyundai i20 R5	Ret	25	25	18	Ret	30*	98
3	Josh McErlean	Peugeot 208 R2	0	2	12	6	22*	DNP	42
4	David Bogie	Škoda Fabia R5	18	8	15	DNP	DNP	DNP	41
5	William Creighton	Peugeot 208 R2	DNP	DNP	10	8	6	11*	35
Pos	Driver	Car	CAM	WCR	PIR	YPR	ULS	GHR	Pts

Key
Colour	Result
Gold	Winner
Silver	2nd place
Bronze	3rd place
Green	Non-podium finish
Purple	Did not finish (Ret)
Black	Disqualified (DSQ)
Black	Excluded (EXC)
White	Did not start (DNS)
*	Joker played

=== British Rally Championship for Co-Drivers ===
Pos	Co-Driver	CAM	WCR	PIR	YPR	ULS	GHR	Points
1	Patrick Walsh	25	18	EXC	25	25	15	108
2	Dale Bowen	Ret	DNP	25	18	0	25	68
3	James Morgan	DNP	25	18	Ret	DNP	DNP	43
4	John Rowan	18	8	15	DNP	DNP	DNP	41
5	Keaton Williams	DNP	2	12	6	18	Ret	38
Pos	Co-Driver	CAM	WCR	PIR	YPR	ULS	GHR	Pts

Key
Colour	Result
Gold	Winner
Silver	2nd place
Bronze	3rd place
Green	Non-podium finish
Purple	Did not finish (Ret)
Black	Disqualified (DSQ)
Black	Excluded (EXC)
White	Did not start (DNS)
*	Joker played
