= 2020 British Rally Championship =

MSA british rallying series 62nd season 2020

The MSA British Rally Championship is a rallying series run over the course of a year, that comprises six tarmac and gravel surface events. 2020 was to be the 62nd season of the series. The season began in the forests of Wales on 8 February and was due to conclude on 19 September in Southern Scotland.

== Series cancellation ==
On 9 June 2020, due to the ongoing COVID-19 pandemic organisers of the British Rally Championship took the decision to cancel the 2020 championship. The coronavirus pandemic continued to spread leading to a number of events being cancelled with round 1, the Cambrian Rally, being the only event to take place.

== 2020 calendar ==
The 2020 championship was to be contested over five rounds in six different territories England, Scotland, Wales, Northern Ireland, Ireland and Belgium. It was to be held on both tarmac and gravel surfaces.

West Cork Rally
Rally Tendring & Clacton
Ulster Rally
Galloway Hills Rally
Wales Rally GB

Due to the COVID-19 pandemic the organisers of the West Cork Rally, the Rally Tendring & Clacton, the Ulster Rally and the Galloway Hills Rally announced that the events would be cancelled. The reserve event, the Wales Rally GB was also cancelled.

The Ypres Rally due to take place in June was postponed until November, but on 30 October the rally was cancelled due to evolution of the virus cases in Belgium.

Round	Dates	Event	Rally HQ	Surface	Website
1	8 February	(United Kingdom) Cambrian Rally	Llandudno, Wales	Gravel	(website)
Cancelled	14-15 March	(Republic of Ireland) West Cork Rally	Clonakilty, Republic of Ireland	Tarmac	(website)
Cancelled	25-26 April	(United Kingdom) Rally Tendring & Clacton	Clacton-on-Sea, England	Tarmac	(website)
Cancelled	~~25-27 June~~; 20-22 November	(Belgium) Ypres Rally	Ypres, Belgium	Tarmac	(website)
Cancelled	21-22 August	(United Kingdom) Ulster Rally	Newry, Northern Ireland	Tarmac	(website)
Cancelled	~~19 September~~; 31 October	(United Kingdom) Galloway Hills Rally	Castle Douglas, Scotland	Gravel	(website)
Cancelled	29 Oct - 1 Nov	(United Kingdom) Wales Rally GB Round 1	Deeside	Gravel	(website)
Cancelled	29 Oct - 1 Nov	(United Kingdom) Wales Rally GB Round 2	Deeside	Gravel	(website)

== Event results ==
Podium places and information on each event.

Round	Rally name	Podium finishers				Statistics			
Round	Rally name	Rank	Driver	Car	Time	Stages	Length - km	Starters	Finishers
1	Cambrian Rally; 8 February	1	Matt Edwards	Ford Fiesta R5	0:46:08.6	7	69.99 km	16	12
1	Cambrian Rally; 8 February	2	Osian Pryce	Hyundai i20 R5	0:46:47.0	7	69.99 km	16	12
1	Cambrian Rally; 8 February	3	Rhys Yates	Ford Fiesta R5	0:47:18.6	7	69.99 km	16	12
