= Connor Wood =

Connor Wood is the name of:

- Connor Wood (basketball) (born 1993), Canadian basketball player
- Connor Wood (footballer) (born 1996), English footballer
- Connor Wood (sprinter) (born 1998), British sprinter and champion at the 2019 British Indoor Athletics Championships
- Connor Wood (comedian), American comedian and podcaster
