= 2020 Monte Carlo Rally =

88th edition of Rallye Automobile Monte-Carlo

2020 Monte Carlo Rally 88^{e} Rallye Automobile Monte-Carlo
Round 1 of 7 in the 2020 World Rally Championship
Next event →
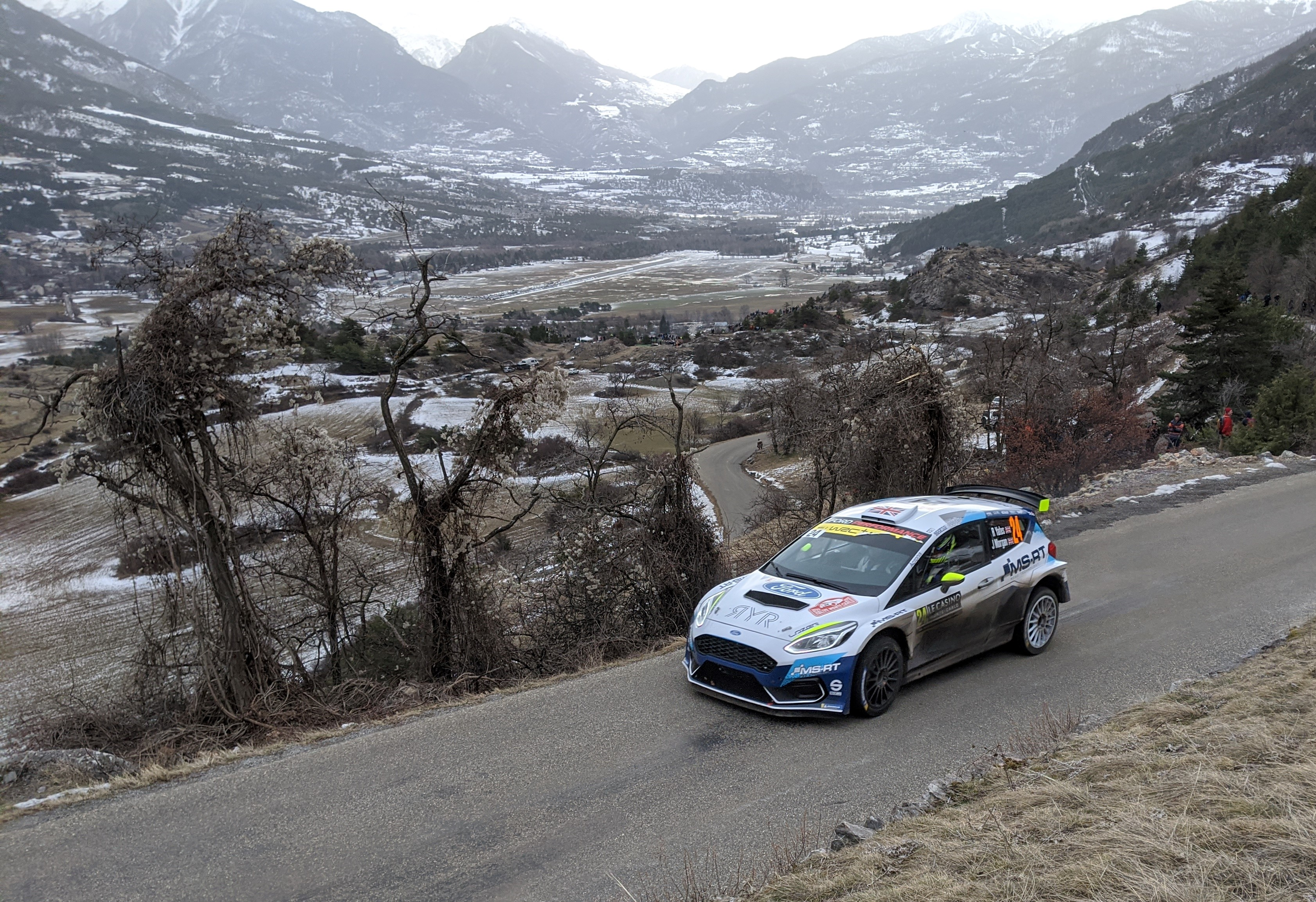
- The Monte Carlo Rally is run on a mixture of tarmac and snow stages.
- Host country: Monaco (Note: Although the rally was run in France, the Fédération Internationale de l'Automobile does not consider France to be the host nation.)
- Rally base: Gap, Hautes-Alpes
- Dates run: 23 – 26 January 2020
- Start location: Quai Albert, Monaco
- Finish location: Casino Square, Monaco
- Stages: 16 (304.28 km; 189.07 miles)
- Stage surface: Tarmac and snow
- Transport distance: 1,201.36 km (746.49 miles)
- Overall distance: 1,505.64 km (935.56 miles)

Statistics
- Crews registered: 88
- Crews: 85 at start, 73 at finish

Overall results
- Overall winner: (Belgium) Thierry Neuville (Belgium) Nicolas Gilsoul (South Korea) Hyundai Shell Mobis WRT; 3:10:57.6
- Power Stage winner: (Belgium) Thierry Neuville (Belgium) Nicolas Gilsoul (South Korea) Hyundai Shell Mobis WRT; 9:39.0

Support category results
- WRC-2 winner: (Norway) Mads Østberg (Norway) Torstein Eriksen (France) PH-Sport; 3:25:19.4
- WRC-3 winner: (France) Eric Camilli (France) François-Xavier Buresi; 3:24:39.8

The 2020 Monte Carlo Rally (also known as the 88^{e} Rallye Automobile Monte-Carlo) was a motor racing event for rally cars that was held over four days between 23 and 26 January 2020. It marked the eighty-eighth running of the Monte Carlo Rally, and was the first round of the 2020 World Rally Championship, World Rally Championship-2 and World Rally Championship-3. The 2020 event was based in the town of Gap in the Hautes-Alpes department of France and consisted of sixteen special stages. The rally covered a total competitive distance of 304.28 km (189.07 mi).

Sébastien Ogier and Julien Ingrassia were the defending rally winners. The Citroën World Rally Team, the team they drove for in 2019, were the reigning manufacturers' winners, but were not defending their title after parent company Citroën withdrew from the sport. Gus Greensmith and Elliott Edmondson were the defending winners in the World Rally Championship-2 category, but were not defending their WRC-2 title as they joined the WRC category in 2020. (Note: The championship was known as the World Rally Championship-2 Pro in 2019.) In the World Rally Championship-3 category, French privateers Yoann Bonato and Benjamin Boulloud were the reigning rally winners. (Note: The championship was known as the World Rally Championship-2 in 2019.)

Thierry Neuville and Nicolas Gilsoul were the overall winners of the rally, winning the Monte Carlo rally for the first time. Their team, Hyundai Shell Mobis WRT, were the manufacturers' winners. Mads Østberg and Torstein Eriksen were the winners in the WRC-2 category, while Eric Camilli and François-Xavier Buresi were the winners in the WRC-3 category.

== Background ==
=== Entry list ===
The following crews were entered into the rally. The event was open to crews competing in the World Rally Championship, its support categories, the World Rally Championship-2 and World Rally Championship-3, and privateer entries that were not registered to score points in any championship. A total of eighty-eight entries were received, with eleven crews entered in World Rally Cars, five crews entered Group R5 cars in the World Rally Championship-2 and a further thirteen crews entered Group R5 cars in the World Rally Championship-3.

| No. | Driver | Co-Driver | Entrant | Car | Tyre |
|---|---|---|---|---|---|
World Rally Championship entries
| 3 | (Finland) Teemu Suninen | (Finland) Jarmo Lehtinen | (United Kingdom) M-Sport Ford WRT | Ford Fiesta WRC | MI |
| 4 | (Finland) Esapekka Lappi | (Finland) Janne Ferm | (United Kingdom) M-Sport Ford WRT | Ford Fiesta WRC | MI |
| 8 | (Estonia) Ott Tänak | (Estonia) Martin Järveoja | (South Korea) Hyundai Shell Mobis WRT | Hyundai i20 Coupe WRC | MI |
| 9 | (France) Sébastien Loeb | (Monaco) Daniel Elena | (South Korea) Hyundai Shell Mobis WRT | Hyundai i20 Coupe WRC | MI |
| 11 | (Belgium) Thierry Neuville | (Belgium) Nicolas Gilsoul | (South Korea) Hyundai Shell Mobis WRT | Hyundai i20 Coupe WRC | MI |
| 17 | (France) Sébastien Ogier | (France) Julien Ingrassia | (Japan) Toyota Gazoo Racing WRT | Toyota Yaris WRC | MI |
| 18 | (Japan) Takamoto Katsuta | (United Kingdom) Daniel Barritt | (Japan) Toyota Gazoo Racing WRT | Toyota Yaris WRC | MI |
| 33 | (United Kingdom) Elfyn Evans | (United Kingdom) Scott Martin | (Japan) Toyota Gazoo Racing WRT | Toyota Yaris WRC | MI |
| 40 | (Lithuania) Deividas Jocius | (Lithuania) Mindaugas Varža | (United Kingdom) M-Sport Ford WRT | Ford Fiesta WRC | MI |
| 44 | (United Kingdom) Gus Greensmith | (United Kingdom) Elliott Edmondson | (United Kingdom) M-Sport Ford WRT | Ford Fiesta WRC | MI |
| 69 | (Finland) Kalle Rovanperä | (Finland) Jonne Halttunen | (Japan) Toyota Gazoo Racing WRT | Toyota Yaris WRC | MI |
World Rally Championship-2 entries
| 20 | (Norway) Mads Østberg | (Norway) Torstein Eriksen | (France) PH-Sport (Note: Entry supported by Citroën World Rally Team.) | Citroën C3 R5 | MI |
| 21 | (Russia) Nikolay Gryazin | (Russia) Yaroslav Fedorov | (South Korea) Hyundai Motorsport N (Note: Entry prepared by RedGrey Rally Team.) | Hyundai NG i20 R5 | P |
| 22 | (Norway) Ole Christian Veiby | (Sweden) Jonas Andersson | (South Korea) Hyundai Motorsport N | Hyundai NG i20 R5 | P |
| 23 | (France) Adrien Fourmaux | (Belgium) Renaud Jamoul | (United Kingdom) M-Sport Ford WRT | Ford Fiesta R5 Mk. II | MI |
| 24 | (United Kingdom) Rhys Yates | (United Kingdom) James Morgan | (United Kingdom) M-Sport Ford WRT | Ford Fiesta R5 Mk. II | MI |
World Rally Championship-3 entries
| 25 | (Brazil) Paulo Nobre | (Brazil) Gabriel Morales | (Brazil) Paulo Nobre (Note: Entry operated by Palmeirinha Rally.) | Škoda Fabia R5 | P |
| 26 | (France) Yoann Bonato | (France) Benjamin Boulloud | (France) Yoann Bonato (Note: Entry operated by CHL Sport Auto.) | Citroën C3 R5 | MI |
| 27 | (France) Eric Camilli | (France) François-Xavier Buresi | (France) Eric Camilli (Note: Entry operated by Saintéloc Racing.) | Citroën C3 R5 | MI |
| 28 | (France) Nicolas Ciamin | (France) Yannick Roche | (France) Nicolas Ciamin (Note: Entry operated by DG Sport.) | Citroën C3 R5 | MI |
| 29 | (Italy) "Pedro" (Note: Pseudonym of Massimo Pedretti.) | (Italy) Emmanuele Baldaccini | (Italy) "Pedro" (Note: Entry supported by MSRT.) | Ford Fiesta R5 Mk. II | P |
| 30 | (Luxembourg) Grégoire Munster | (Belgium) Louis Louka | (Luxembourg) Grégoire Munster | Škoda Fabia R5 | P |
| 31 | (France) Yohan Rossel | (France) Benoît Fulcrand | (France) PH-Sport | Citroën C3 R5 | MI |
| 32 | (France) Stéphane Sarrazin | (France) Kévin Parent | (France) Stéphane Sarrazin (Note: Entry also known as Sarrazin Motorsport.) | Hyundai NG i20 R5 | P |
| 34 | (Italy) Umberto Scandola | (Italy) Guido D'Amore | (Italy) Umberto Scandola | Hyundai NG i20 R5 | MI |
| 35 | (Italy) Andrea Nucita | (Italy) Bernardo Di Caro | (Italy) Andrea Nucita | Hyundai NG i20 R5 | P |
| 36 | (Spain) Miguel Díaz-Aboitiz | (Spain) Diego Sanjuan De Eusebio | (Spain) Miguel Díaz-Aboitiz | Škoda Fabia R5 | P |
| 37 | (Italy) Enrico Brazzoli | (Italy) Maurizio Barone | (Italy) Enrico Brazzoli | Škoda Fabia R5 | P |
| 38 | (Spain) Pepe Lopéz | (Spain) Borja Rozada | (Spain) Pepe Lopéz (Note: Entry operated by Sports&You.) | Citroën C3 R5 | P |
Other major entries
| 41 | (Sweden) Oliver Solberg | (Republic of Ireland) Aaron Johnston | (Sweden) Oliver Solberg (Note: Entry operated by Sports Racing Technologies.) | Volkswagen Polo GTI R5 | P |

=== Route ===
The route for the 2020 rally features a total of 304.28 km (189.07 mi) in competitive kilometres, which is 19.55 km (12.15 mi) shorter than the route that was used in the 2019 event. The 2020 route features substantial revisions to the route used in 2019, with the addition of the Malijal — Puimichel, Curbans — Venterol and St. Clement-sur-Durance — Freissinieres stages. The Bayons — Bréziers stage returned to the rally after being absent in 2019, while the Valdrôme — Sigottier and Roussieux — Laborel stages were removed from the itinerary.

==== Itinerary ====
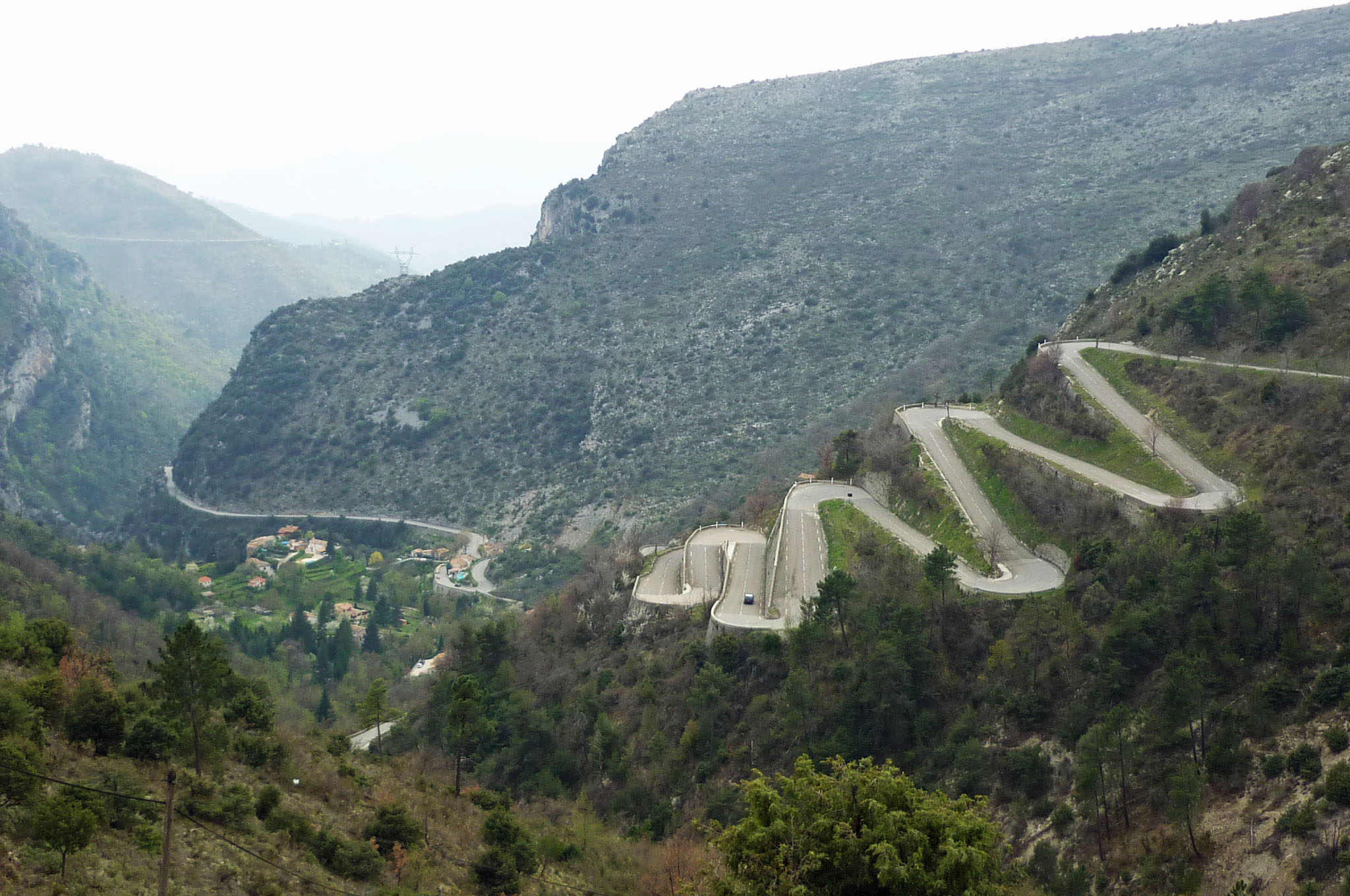
The Col de Braus mountain pass will be contested as the rally's Power Stage.

All dates and times are CET (UTC+1).

| Date | Time | No. | Stage name | Distance |
|---|---|---|---|---|
| 22 January | 16:01 | — | Gap [Shakedown] | 3.35 km |
Leg 1 — 165.54 km
| 23 January | 20:38 | SS1 | Malijal — Puimichel | 17.47 km |
| 23 January | 22:26 | SS2 | Bayons — Bréziers | 25.49 km |
| 24 January | 08:36 | SS3 | Curbans — Venterol 1 | 20.02 km |
| 24 January | 09:56 | SS4 | St. Clement-sur-Durance — Freissinieres 1 | 20.68 km |
| 24 January | 11:21 | SS5 | Avançon — Notre-Dame-du-Laus 1 | 20.59 km |
| 24 January | 13:54 | SS6 | Curbans — Venterol 2 | 20.02 km |
| 24 January | 15:14 | SS7 | St. Clement-sur-Durance — Freissinieres 2 | 20.68 km |
| 24 January | 16:39 | SS8 | Avançon — Notre-Dame-du-Laus 2 | 20.59 km |
Leg 2 — 75.20 km
| 25 January | 09:38 | SS9 | St.-Leger-les-Mélèzes — La-Bâtie-Neuve 1 | 16.87 km |
| 25 January | 10:56 | SS10 | La Bréole — Selonnet 1 | 20.73 km |
| 25 January | 14:08 | SS11 | St.-Leger-les-Mélèzes — La-Bâtie-Neuve 2 | 16.87 km |
| 25 January | 15:26 | SS12 | La Bréole — Selonnet 2 | 20.73 km |
Leg 3 — 63.54 km
| 26 January | 08:17 | SS13 | La Bollène-Vésubie — Peïra Cava 1 | 18.41 km |
| 26 January | 09:08 | SS14 | La Cabanette — Col de Braus 1 | 13.36 km |
| 26 January | 10:55 | SS15 | La Bollène-Vésubie — Peïra Cava 2 | 18.41 km |
| 26 January | 12:18 | SS16 | La Cabanette — Col de Braus 2 [Power Stage] | 13.36 km |

== Report ==
=== World Rally Cars ===
Sébastien Ogier and Julien Ingrassia took an early lead on Thursday evening, but Thierry Neuville and Nicolas Gilsoul moved into the lead at the end of the second stage. The lead changed hands several times throughout the opening leg; Elfyn Evans and Scott Martin took the lead on the first morning before Ogier and Ingrassia consolidated their position by the end of the leg. Defending World Champions Ott Tänak and Martin Järveoja suffered a high-speed crash on the first pass through the St. Clement-sur-Durance — Freissinieres stage. Their Hyundai i20 Coupe WRC flew off a 40-metre high cliff at 180 km/h (111.8 mph) and rolled end-over-end through a series of trees before landing on the road below. Both Tänak and Järveoja walked away uninjured. Rally leaders changed several times throughout the second leg, with Evans and Martin eventually establishing a lead over teammates Ogier and Ingrassia. The third leg saw Neuville and Gilsoul re-emerge as the leaders, winning all four stages to claim their first win in Monte Carlo. This saw them take twenty-five points for the outright win and five bonus points for winning the Power Stage. Ogier and Ingrassia passed Evans and Martin to finish the Power Stage in second place, only a few thousandths of a second behind Neuville and Gilsoul.

==== Classification ====
| Position | | No. | Driver | Co-driver | Entrant | Car | Time | Difference | Points | |
| Event | Class | No. | Driver | Co-driver | Entrant | Car | Time | Difference | Event | Stage |
|---|---|---|---|---|---|---|---|---|---|---|
| 1 | 1 | 11 | Thierry Neuville | Nicolas Gilsoul | Hyundai Shell Mobis WRT | Hyundai i20 Coupe WRC | 3:10:57.6 | 0.0 | 25 | 5 |
| 2 | 2 | 17 | Sébastien Ogier | Julien Ingrassia | Toyota Gazoo Racing WRT | Toyota Yaris WRC | 3:11:10.2 | +12.6 | 18 | 4 |
| 3 | 3 | 33 | Elfyn Evans | Scott Martin | Toyota Gazoo Racing WRT | Toyota Yaris WRC | 3:11:11.9 | +14.3 | 15 | 2 |
| 4 | 4 | 4 | Esapekka Lappi | Janne Ferm | M-Sport Ford WRT | Ford Fiesta WRC | 3:14:06.6 | +3:09.0 | 12 | 1 |
| 5 | 5 | 69 | Kalle Rovanperä | Jonne Halttunen | Toyota Gazoo Racing WRT | Toyota Yaris WRC | 3:15:14.8 | +4:17.2 | 10 | 0 |
| 6 | 6 | 9 | Sébastien Loeb | Daniel Elena | Hyundai Shell Mobis WRT | Hyundai i20 Coupe WRC | 3:16:02.3 | +5:04.7 | 8 | 0 |
| 7 | 7 | 18 | Takamoto Katsuta | Daniel Barritt | Toyota Gazoo Racing WRT | Toyota Yaris WRC | 3:22:25.5 | +11:27.9 | 6 | 0 |
| 8 | 8 | 3 | Teemu Suninen | Jarmo Lehtinen | M-Sport Ford WRT | Ford Fiesta WRC | 3:24:28.0 | +13:30.4 | 4 | 3 |
| 17 | 9 | 40 | Deividas Jocius | Mindaugas Varža | M-Sport Ford WRT | Ford Fiesta WRC | 3:35:17.5 | +24:19.9 | 0 | 0 |
| 63 (Note: Under rules unique to the Monte Carlo Rally, only the top sixty crews at the end of the second leg start the third leg. Those outside the top sixty are retired, but are considered to have finished the rally.) | 10 | 44 | Gus Greensmith | Elliott Edmondson | M-Sport Ford WRT | Ford Fiesta WRC | 4:38:15.1 | +1:27:17.5 | 0 | 0 |
| Retired SS4 | | 8 | Ott Tänak | Martin Järveoja | Hyundai Shell Mobis WRT | Hyundai i20 Coupe WRC | Accident | | 0 | 0 |

==== Special stages ====
| Day | Stage | Stage name | Length | Winners | Car | Time | Class leaders |
|---|---|---|---|---|---|---|---|
| 22 January | — | Gap [Shakedown] | 3.35 km | Ogier / Ingrassia | Toyota Yaris WRC | 1:57.1 | —N/a |
| 23 January | SS1 | Malijal — Puimichel | 17.47 km | Ogier / Ingrassia | Toyota Yaris WRC | 9:53.4 | Ogier / Ingrassia |
| 23 January | SS2 | Bayons — Bréziers | 25.49 km | Neuville / Gilsoul | Hyundai i20 Coupe WRC | 16:23.7 | Neuville / Gilsoul |
| 24 January | SS3 | Curbans — Venterol 1 | 20.02 km | Evans / Martin | Toyota Yaris WRC | 13:22.0 | Neuville / Gilsoul |
| 24 January | SS4 | St. Clement-sur-Durance — Freissinieres 1 | 20.68 km | Evans / Martin | Toyota Yaris WRC | 11:43.3 | Evans / Martin |
| 24 January | SS5 | Avançon — Notre-Dame-du-Laus 1 | 20.59 km | Evans / Martin | Toyota Yaris WRC | 13:00.7 | Evans / Martin |
| 24 January | SS6 | Curbans — Venterol 2 | 20.02 km | Ogier / Ingrassia | Toyota Yaris WRC | 13:20.8 | Evans / Martin |
| 24 January | SS7 | St. Clement-sur-Durance — Freissinieres 2 | 20.68 km | Ogier / Ingrassia | Toyota Yaris WRC | 11:52.0 | Evans / Martin |
| 24 January | SS8 | Avançon — Notre-Dame-du-Laus 2 | 20.59 km | Neuville / Gilsoul | Hyundai i20 Coupe WRC | 13:13.1 | Ogier / Ingrassia |
| 25 January | SS9 | St.-Leger-les-Mélèzes — La-Bâtie-Neuve 1 | 16.87 km | Neuville / Gilsoul | Hyundai i20 Coupe WRC | 10:28.8 | Ogier / Ingrassia |
| 25 January | SS10 | La Bréole — Selonnet 1 | 20.73 km | Evans / Martin | Toyota Yaris WRC | 12:34.4 | Evans / Martin |
| 25 January | SS11 | St.-Leger-les-Mélèzes — La-Bâtie-Neuve 2 | 16.87 km | Neuville / Gilsoul | Hyundai i20 Coupe WRC | 9:34.6 | Ogier / Ingrassia; Evans / Martin |
| 25 January | SS12 | La Bréole — Selonnet 2 | 20.73 km | Neuville / Gilsoul | Hyundai i20 Coupe WRC | 12:12.0 | Evans / Martin |
| 26 January | SS13 | La Bollène-Vésubie — Peïra Cava 1 | 18.41 km | Neuville / Gilsoul | Hyundai i20 Coupe WRC | 11:24.1 | Evans / Martin |
| 26 January | SS14 | La Cabanette — Col de Braus 1 | 13.36 km | Neuville / Gilsoul | Hyundai i20 Coupe WRC | 9:47.9 | Neuville / Gilsoul |
| 26 January | SS15 | La Bollène-Vésubie — Peïra Cava 2 | 18.41 km | Neuville / Gilsoul | Hyundai i20 Coupe WRC | 11:25.1 | Neuville / Gilsoul |
| 26 January | SS16 | La Cabanette — Col de Braus 2 [Power Stage] | 13.36 km | Neuville / Gilsoul | Hyundai i20 Coupe WRC | 9:39.0 | Neuville / Gilsoul |

==== Championship standings ====
| Pos. | Drivers' championships | | | Co-drivers' championships | | | Manufacturers' championships | | |
| Pos. | Move | Driver | Points | Move | Co-driver | Points | Move | Manufacturer | Points |
|---|---|---|---|---|---|---|---|---|---|
| 1 | | Thierry Neuville | 30 | | Nicolas Gilsoul | 30 | | Hyundai Shell Mobis WRT | 35 |
| 2 | | Sébastien Ogier | 22 | | Julien Ingrassia | 22 | | Toyota Gazoo Racing WRT | 33 |
| 3 | | Elfyn Evans | 17 | | Scott Martin | 17 | | M-Sport Ford WRT | 20 |
| 4 | | Esapekka Lappi | 13 | | Janne Ferm | 13 | | | |
| 5 | | Kalle Rovanperä | 10 | | Jonne Halttunen | 10 | | | |

=== World Rally Championship-2 ===
Mads Østberg and Torstein Eriksenled the WRC-2 category going into Friday, but a puncture cost him the lead. Ole Christian Veiby and Jonas Andersson then took over the lead until later they also suffered a puncture, which handed the lead back to Østberg and Eriksen. The Norwegian crew extended their lead on Saturday, and eventually won the class.

==== Classification ====
| Position | | No. | Driver | Co-driver | Entrant | Car | Time | Difference | Points | |
| Event | Class | No. | Driver | Co-driver | Entrant | Car | Time | Difference | Class | Event |
|---|---|---|---|---|---|---|---|---|---|---|
| 10 | 1 | 20 | Mads Østberg | Torstein Eriksen | PH-Sport | Citroën C3 R5 | 3:25:19.4 | 0.0 | 25 | 1 |
| 15 | 2 | 23 | Adrien Fourmaux | Renaud Jamoul | M-Sport Ford WRT | Ford Fiesta R5 Mk. II | 3:28:50.8 | +3:31.4 | 18 | 0 |
| 16 | 3 | 21 | Nikolay Gryazin | Yaroslav Fedorov | Hyundai Motorsport N | Hyundai i20 R5 | 3:30:45.0 | +5:25.6 | 15 | 0 |
| 19 | 4 | 24 | Rhys Yates | James Morgan | M-Sport Ford WRT | Ford Fiesta R5 Mk. II | 3:38:22.4 | +13:03.0 | 12 | 0 |
| Retired SS14 | | 22 | Ole Christian Veiby | Jonas Andersson | Hyundai Motorsport N | Hyundai i20 R5 | Accident | | 0 | 0 |

==== Special stages ====
| Day | Stage | Stage name | Length | Winners | Car | Time | Class leaders |
|---|---|---|---|---|---|---|---|
| 22 January | — | Gap [Shakedown] | 3.35 km | Østberg / Eriksen | Citroën C3 R5 | 2:04.1 | —N/a |
| 23 January | SS1 | Malijal — Puimichel | 17.47 km | Fourmaux / Jamoul | Ford Fiesta R5 Mk. II | 10:31.9 | Fourmaux / Jamoul |
| 23 January | SS2 | Bayons — Bréziers | 25.49 km | Østberg / Eriksen | Citroën C3 R5 | 17:46.0 | Østberg / Eriksen |
| 24 January | SS3 | Curbans — Venterol 1 | 20.02 km | Veiby / Andersson | Hyundai i20 R5 | 14:20.6 | Veiby / Andersson |
| 24 January | SS4 | St. Clement-sur-Durance — Freissinieres 1 | 20.68 km | Fourmaux / Jamoul | Ford Fiesta R5 Mk. II | 12:22.8 | Veiby / Andersson |
| 24 January | SS5 | Avançon — Notre-Dame-du-Laus 1 | 20.59 km | Fourmaux / Jamoul | Ford Fiesta R5 Mk. II | 13:59.9 | Veiby / Andersson |
| 24 January | SS6 | Curbans — Venterol 2 | 20.02 km | Østberg / Eriksen | Citroën C3 R5 | 14:15.4 | Østberg / Eriksen |
| 24 January | SS7 | St. Clement-sur-Durance — Freissinieres 2 | 20.68 km | Fourmaux / Jamoul | Ford Fiesta R5 Mk. II | 12:37.4 | Østberg / Eriksen |
| 24 January | SS8 | Avançon — Notre-Dame-du-Laus 2 | 20.59 km | Veiby / Andersson | Hyundai i20 R5 | 14:07.9 | Østberg / Eriksen |
| 25 January | SS9 | St.-Leger-les-Mélèzes — La-Bâtie-Neuve 1 | 16.87 km | Fourmaux / Jamoul | Ford Fiesta R5 Mk. II | 10:51.0 | Østberg / Eriksen |
| 25 January | SS10 | La Bréole — Selonnet 1 | 20.73 km | Østberg / Eriksen | Citroën C3 R5 | 13:24.0 | Østberg / Eriksen |
| 25 January | SS11 | St.-Leger-les-Mélèzes — La-Bâtie-Neuve 2 | 16.87 km | Østberg / Eriksen | Citroën C3 R5 | 10:13.9 | Østberg / Eriksen |
| 25 January | SS12 | La Bréole — Selonnet 2 | 20.73 km | Østberg / Eriksen | Citroën C3 R5 | 13:04.6 | Østberg / Eriksen |
| 26 January | SS13 | La Bollène-Vésubie — Peïra Cava 1 | 18.41 km | Østberg / Eriksen | Citroën C3 R5 | 12:01.5 | Østberg / Eriksen |
| 26 January | SS14 | La Cabanette — Col de Braus 1 | 13.36 km | Østberg / Eriksen | Citroën C3 R5 | 10:18.3 | Østberg / Eriksen |
| 26 January | SS15 | La Bollène-Vésubie — Peïra Cava 2 | 18.41 km | Fourmaux / Jamoul | Ford Fiesta R5 Mk. II | 12:01.0 | Østberg / Eriksen |
| 26 January | SS16 | La Cabanette — Col de Braus 2 | 13.36 km | Fourmaux / Jamoul | Ford Fiesta R5 Mk. II | 10:03.9 | Østberg / Eriksen |

==== Championship standings ====
| Pos. | Drivers' championships | | | Co-drivers' championships | | | Manufacturers' championships | | |
| Pos. | Move | Driver | Points | Move | Co-driver | Points | Move | Manufacturer | Points |
|---|---|---|---|---|---|---|---|---|---|
| 1 | | Mads Østberg | 25 | | Torstein Eriksen | 25 | | M-Sport Ford WRT | 30 |
| 2 | | Adrien Fourmaux | 18 | | Renaud Jamoul | 18 | | PH-Sport | 25 |
| 3 | | Nikolay Gryazin | 15 | | Yaroslav Fedorov | 15 | | Hyundai Motorsport N | 15 |
| 4 | | Rhys Yates | 12 | | James Morgan | 12 | | | |
| 5 | | Ole Christian Veiby | 0 | | Jonas Andersson | 0 | | | |

=== World Rally Championship-3 ===
Eric Camilli and François-Xavier Buresi held a 21-second lead over Stéphane Sarrazin and Kévin Parent by the end of Thursday night. Friday's complicated conditions caught out several crews, including those of Sarrazin and Parent, Paulo Nobre and Gabriel Morales, and Umberto Scandola and Guido D'Amore. Camilli and Buresi comfortably won the category after a perfect weekend.

==== Classification ====
| Position | | No. | Driver | Co-driver | Entrant | Car | Time | Difference | Points | |
| Event | Class | No. | Driver | Co-driver | Entrant | Car | Time | Difference | Class | Event |
|---|---|---|---|---|---|---|---|---|---|---|
| 9 | 1 | 27 | Eric Camilli | François-Xavier Buresi | Eric Camilli | Citroën C3 R5 | 3:24:39.8 | 0.0 | 25 | 2 |
| 11 | 2 | 28 | Nicolas Ciamin | Yannick Roche | Nicolas Ciamin | Citroën C3 R5 | 3:26:01.6 | +1:21.8 | 18 | 0 |
| 12 | 3 | 26 | Yoann Bonato | Benjamin Boulloud | Yoann Bonato | Citroën C3 R5 | 3:26:43.6 | +2:03.8 | 15 | 0 |
| 13 | 4 | 31 | Yohan Rossel | Benoît Fulcrand | PH-Sport | Citroën C3 R5 | 3:27:17.8 | +2:38.0 | 12 | 0 |
| 14 | 5 | 30 | Grégoire Munster | Louis Louka | Grégoire Munster | Škoda Fabia R5 | 3:27:59.6 | +3:19.8 | 10 | 0 |
| 38 | 6 | 37 | Enrico Brazzoli | Maurizio Barone | Enrico Brazzoli | Škoda Fabia R5 | 4:08:19.5 | +43:39.7 | 10 | 0 |
| 52 | 7 | 36 | Miguel Díaz-Aboitiz | Diego Sanjuan De Eusebio | Miguel Díaz-Aboitiz | Škoda Fabia R5 | 4:16:20.0 | +51:40.2 | 6 | 0 |
| 67 | 8 | 34 | Umberto Scandola | Guido D'Amore | Umberto Scandola | Hyundai i20 R5 | 4:48:19.9 | +1:23:40.1 | 4 | 0 |
| 71 | 9 | 25 | Paulo Nobre | Gabriel Morales | Paulo Nobre | Škoda Fabia R5 | 4:54:40.7 | +1:30:00.9 | 2 | 0 |
| Retired SS15 | | 29 | "Pedro" | Emmanuele Baldaccini | "Pedro" | Ford Fiesta R5 Mk. II | Mechanical | | 0 | 0 |
| Retired SS13 | | 38 | Pepe Lopéz | Borja Rozada | Pepe Lopéz | Citroën C3 R5 | Mechanical | | 0 | 0 |
| Retired SS12 | | 35 | Andrea Nucita | Bernardo Di Caro | Andrea Nucita | Hyundai i20 R5 | Mechanical | | 0 | 0 |
| Retired SS6 | | 32 | Stéphane Sarrazin | Kévin Parent | Stéphane Sarrazin | Hyundai i20 R5 | Accident | | 0 | 0 |

==== Special stages ====
| Day | Stage | Stage name | Length | Winners | Car | Time | Class leaders |
|---|---|---|---|---|---|---|---|
| 22 January | — | Gap [Shakedown] | 3.35 km | Bonato / Boulloud; Ciamin / Roche; Lopéz / Rozada | Citroën C3 R5; Citroën C3 R5; Citroën C3 R5 | 2:07.7 | —N/a |
| 23 January | SS1 | Malijal — Puimichel | 17.47 km | Camilli / Buresi | Citroën C3 R5 | 10:29.1 | Camilli / Buresi |
| 23 January | SS2 | Bayons — Bréziers | 25.49 km | Camilli / Buresi | Citroën C3 R5 | 17:53.0 | Camilli / Buresi |
| 24 January | SS3 | Curbans — Venterol 1 | 20.02 km | Sarrazin / Parent | Hyundai i20 R5 | 14:26.4 | Camilli / Buresi |
| 24 January | SS4 | St. Clement-sur-Durance — Freissinieres 1 | 20.68 km | Ciamin / Roche | Citroën C3 R5 | 12:33.5 | Camilli / Buresi |
| 24 January | SS5 | Avançon — Notre-Dame-du-Laus 1 | 20.59 km | Camilli / Buresi | Citroën C3 R5 | 14:01.3 | Camilli / Buresi |
| 24 January | SS6 | Curbans — Venterol 2 | 20.02 km | Munster / Louka | Škoda Fabia R5 | 14:23.8 | Camilli / Buresi |
| 24 January | SS7 | St. Clement-sur-Durance — Freissinieres 2 | 20.68 km | Ciamin / Roche | Citroën C3 R5 | 12:47.7 | Camilli / Buresi |
| 24 January | SS8 | Avançon — Notre-Dame-du-Laus 2 | 20.59 km | Camilli / Buresi | Citroën C3 R5 | 14:16.4 | Camilli / Buresi |
| 25 January | SS9 | St.-Leger-les-Mélèzes — La-Bâtie-Neuve 1 | 16.87 km | Camilli / Buresi | Citroën C3 R5 | 10:51.8 | Camilli / Buresi |
| 25 January | SS10 | La Bréole — Selonnet 1 | 20.73 km | Camilli / Buresi | Citroën C3 R5 | 13:19.0 | Camilli / Buresi |
| 25 January | SS11 | St.-Leger-les-Mélèzes — La-Bâtie-Neuve 2 | 16.87 km | Ciamin / Roche | Citroën C3 R5 | 10:27.9 | Camilli / Buresi |
| 25 January | SS12 | La Bréole — Selonnet 2 | 20.73 km | Munster / Louka | Škoda Fabia R5 | 13:14.4 | Camilli / Buresi |
| 26 January | SS13 | La Bollène-Vésubie — Peïra Cava 1 | 18.41 km | Bonato / Boulloud | Citroën C3 R5 | 12:05.4 | Camilli / Buresi |
| 26 January | SS14 | La Cabanette — Col de Braus 1 | 13.36 km | Ciamin / Roche | Citroën C3 R5 | 10:25.0 | Camilli / Buresi |
| 26 January | SS15 | La Bollène-Vésubie — Peïra Cava 2 | 18.41 km | Camilli / Buresi | Citroën C3 R5 | 12:03.3 | Camilli / Buresi |
| 26 January | SS16 | La Cabanette — Col de Braus 2 | 13.36 km | Bonato / Boulloud | Citroën C3 R5 | 10:10.6 | Camilli / Buresi |

==== Championship standings ====
| Pos. | Drivers' championships | | | Co-drivers' championships | | |
| Pos. | Move | Driver | Points | Move | Co-driver | Points |
|---|---|---|---|---|---|---|
| 1 | | Eric Camilli | 25 | | François-Xavier Buresi | 25 |
| 2 | | Nicolas Ciamin | 18 | | Yannick Roche | 18 |
| 3 | | Yoann Bonato | 15 | | Benjamin Boulloud | 15 |
| 4 | | Yohan Rossel | 12 | | Benoît Fulcrand | 12 |
| 5 | | Grégoire Munster | 10 | | Louis Louka | 10 |

== Notes ==
| Previous rally: 2019 Rally Australia (2019) | 2020 FIA World Rally Championship | Next rally: 2020 Rally Sweden |
| Previous rally: 2019 Monte Carlo Rally | 2020 Monte Carlo Rally | Next rally: 2021 Monte Carlo Rally |
