= Opel Adam =

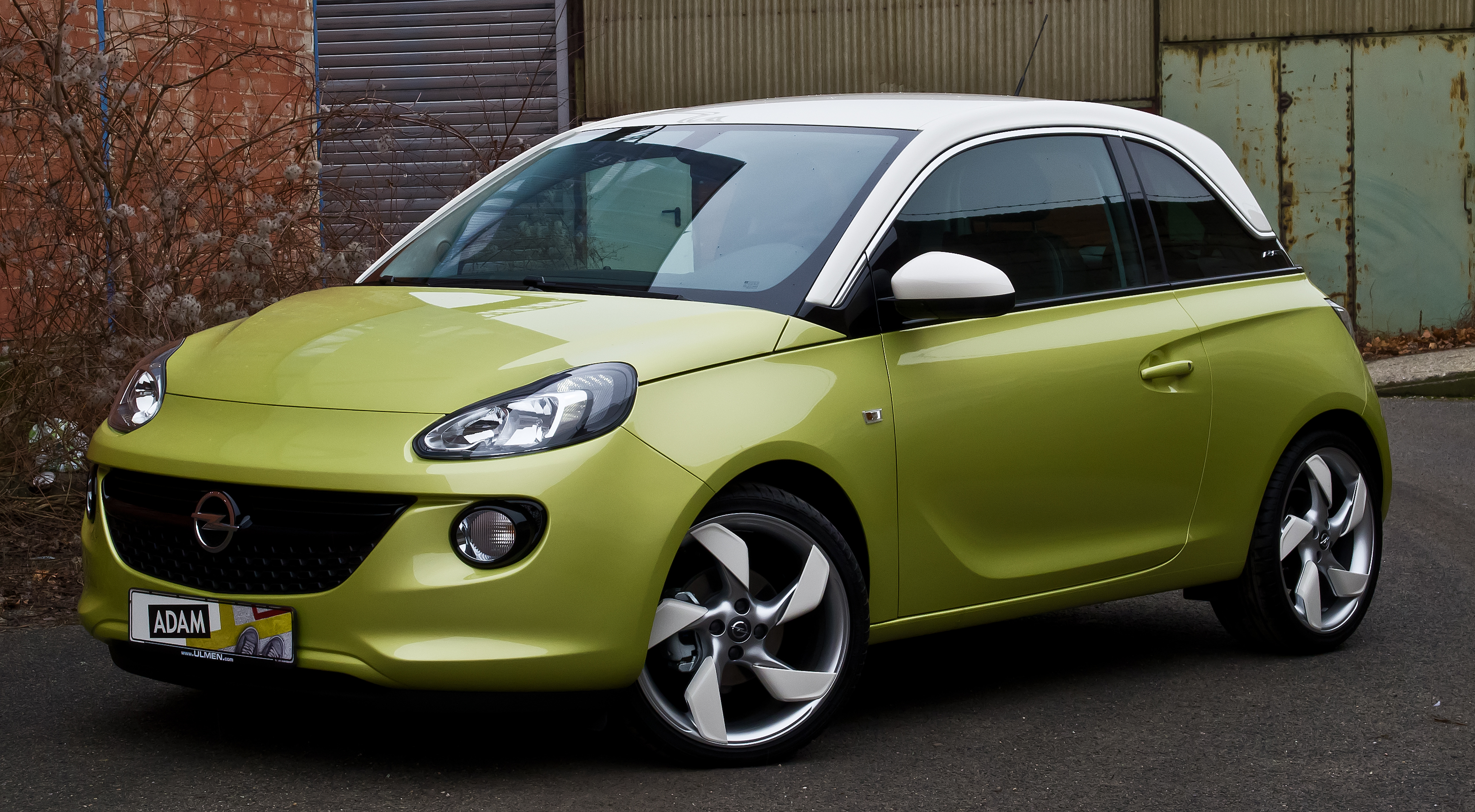
- Opel Adam

Overview
- Manufacturer: Opel
- Also called: Vauxhall Adam (United Kingdom)
- Production: 2012–2019
- Model years: 2013–2019
- Assembly: Germany: Eisenach (Opel Eisenach GmbH)
- Designer: Darren Luke

Body and chassis
- Class: City car (A)
- Body style: 3-door hatchback
- Layout: Front-engine, front-wheel-drive
- Platform: SCCS platform
- Related: Opel Corsa

Powertrain
- Engine: petrol: 1.0 L B10XFL/XFT turbo I3; 1.2 L A12XEL (LWD) I4; 1.4 L A14XEL (L2Z) I4; 1.4 L B14NEH (LUJ) turbo I4 (Adam S)
- Transmission: 5-speed manual 6-speed manual 5-speed Easytronic automated manual

Dimensions
- Wheelbase: 2,311 mm (91.0 in)
- Length: 3,698 mm (145.6 in)
- Width: 1,720 mm (67.7 in)
- Height: 1,484 mm (58.4 in)
- Curb weight: 1,086–1,135 kg (2,394–2,502 lb)

Chronology
- Predecessor: Opel Agila

The Opel Adam is a city car engineered and produced by the German car manufacturer Opel, and is named after the company's founder Adam Opel. It was sold under the Vauxhall marque in the United Kingdom. It was launched in France at the 2012 Paris Motor Show, with sales starting in the beginning of 2013.

On 10 October 2018, Opel and its British subsidiary, Vauxhall, announced that in order to optimise its model lineup and focus on high volume segments, the company would retire its Adam, Karl, Cascada and Viva models after the end of their life cycles, in approximately one year.

No successor model will replace the Adam, as the company announced intentions to focus on SUVs, notably a new Opel Mokka, as part of a strategy to increase company SUV sales from 25% to 40% by 2021. On 29 April 2019, the Opel and Vauxhall website configurator for new Adam cars was replaced by a list of available stock; production came to an end on 3 May 2019.

== History ==
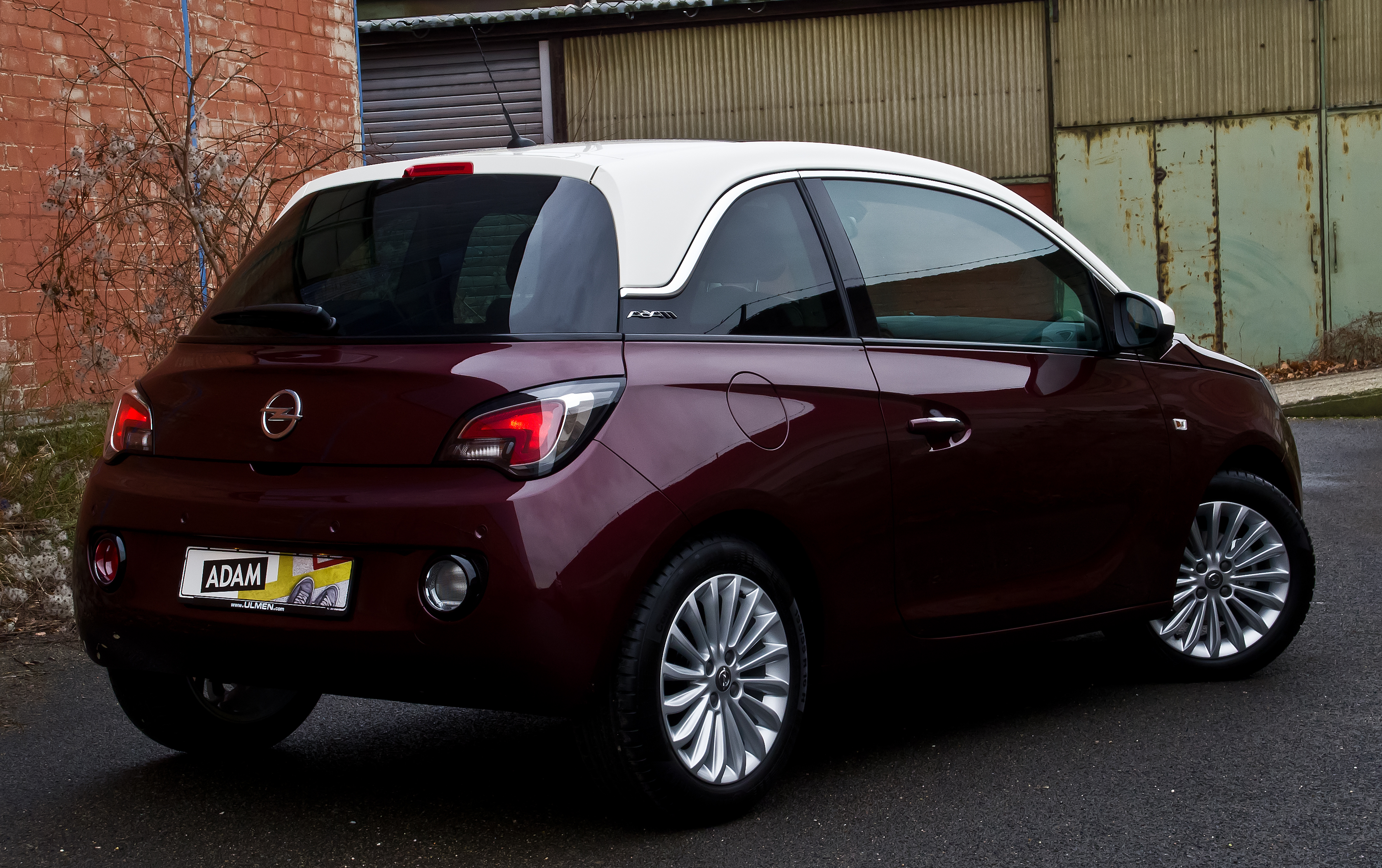
Rear view

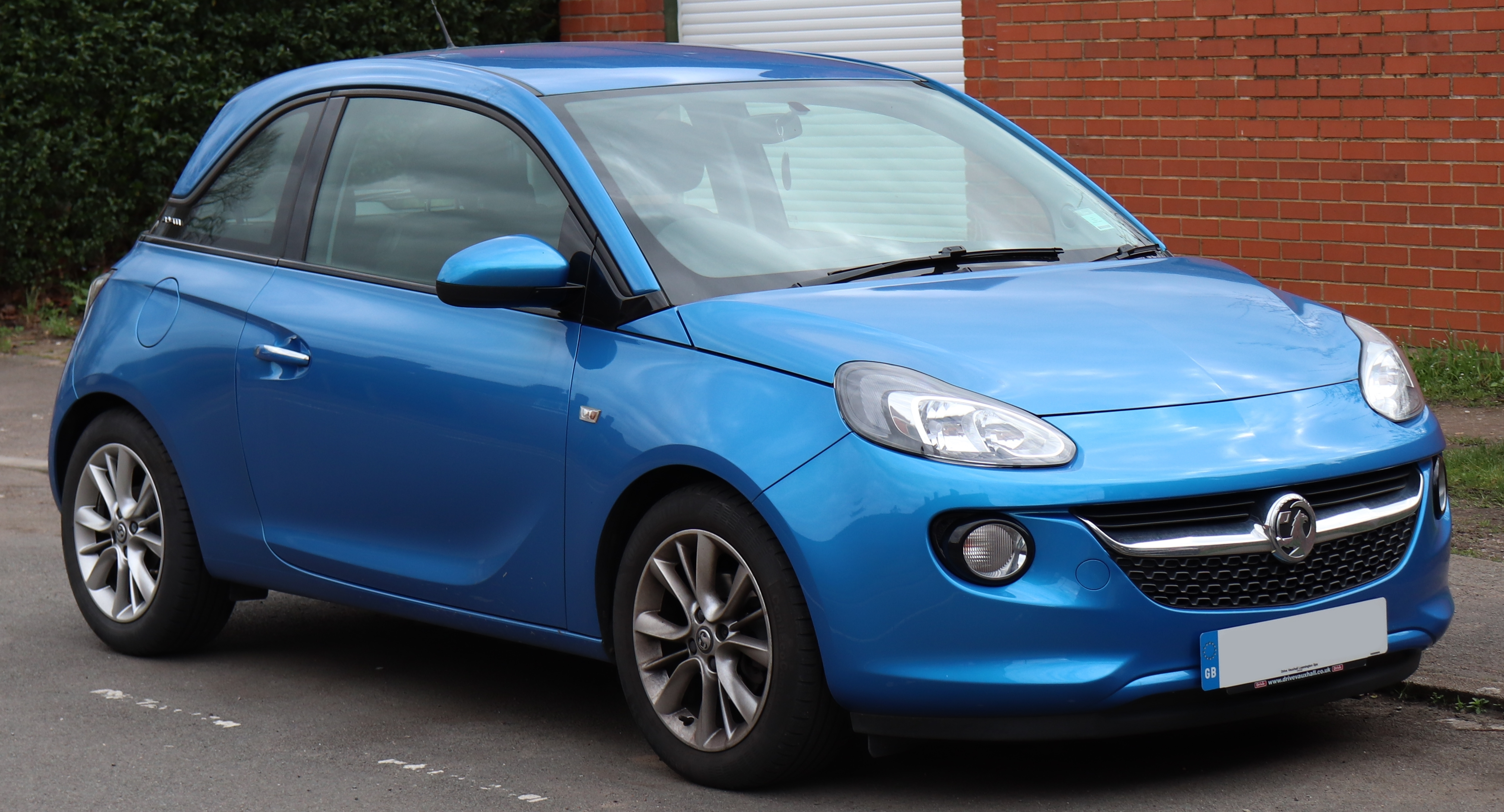
Vauxhall Adam

During development, the project was codenamed "Junior", a reference to the 1983 Opel Junior concept car. The Adam's official name was announced in April 2012.

The car was available in three different trim levels and a wide choice of exterior colours, as well as three roof colours, different interior colours, decors and various headliners. The Adam is claimed to have over 61,000 combination possibilities for the exterior and over 82,000 for the interior. Production began at the Eisenach plant in Germany in January 2013, beside the Corsa.

The Adam is based on a shortened version of the Corsa D platform. The three door hatchback measures 3.70 metres in length and 1.72 metres in width, and seats four people.

=== Adam Rocks ===
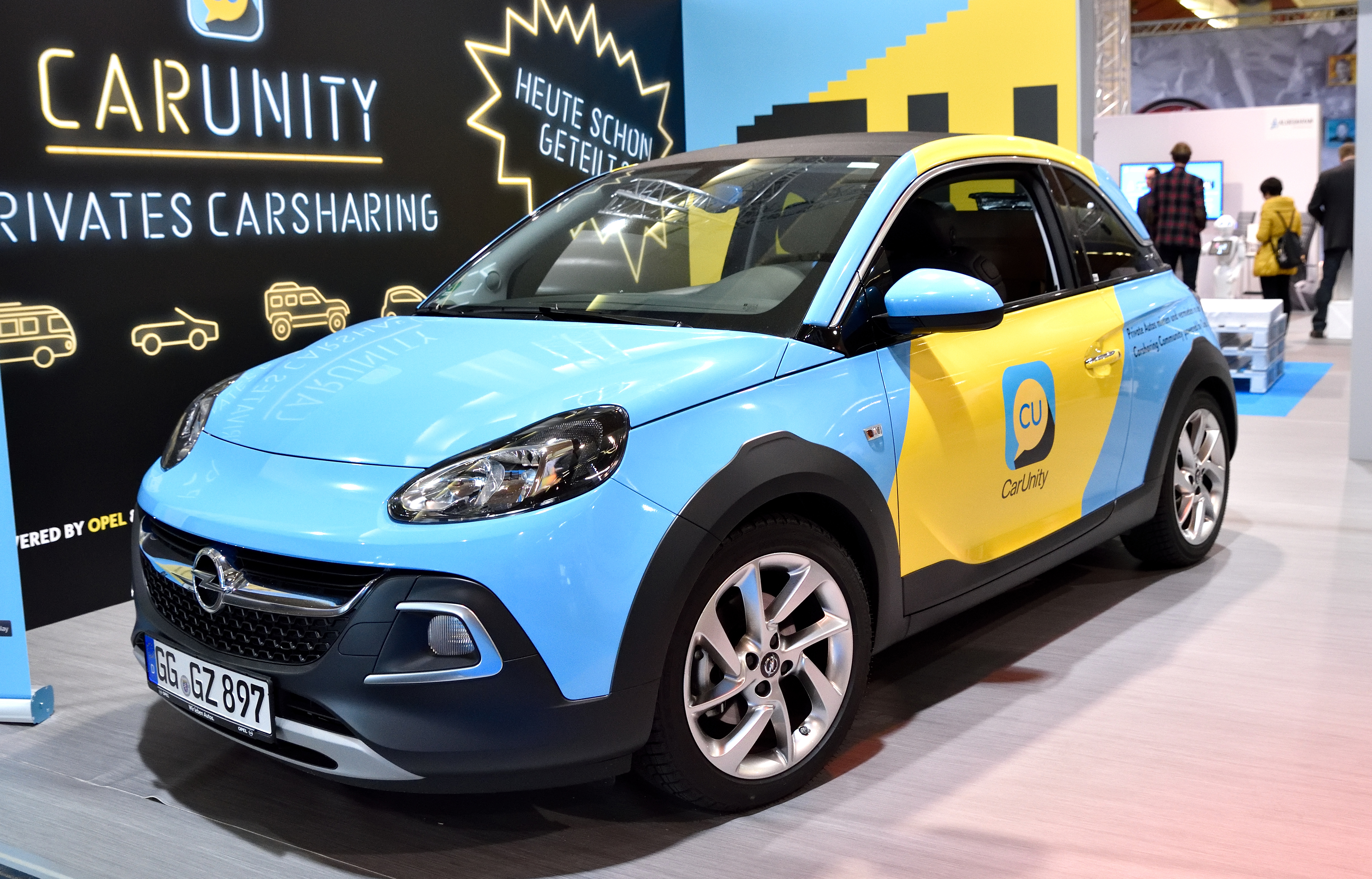
Opel Adam Rocks

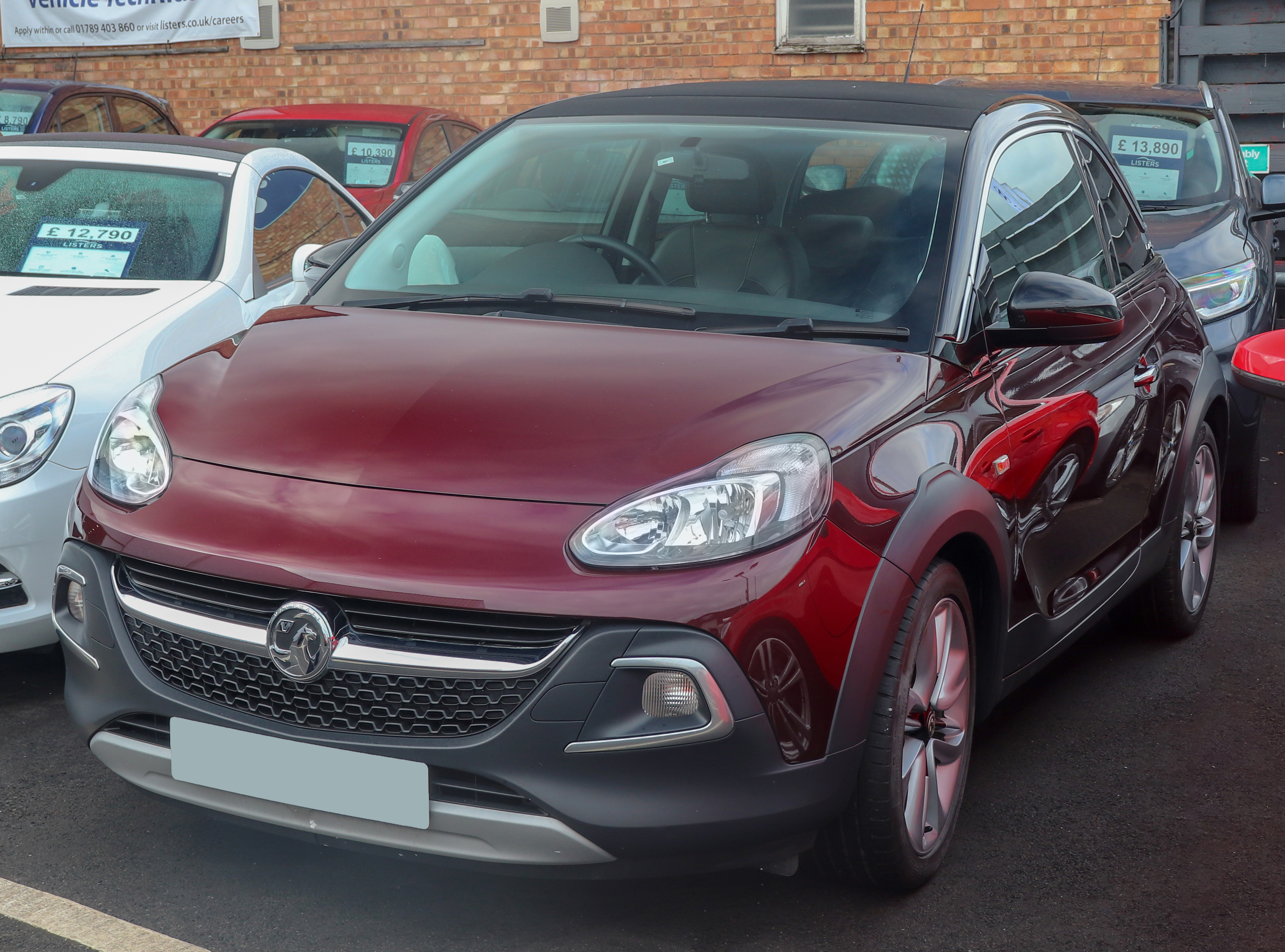
Vauxhall Adam Rocks

To boost sales of the Adam, Opel launched a crossover convertible at the 2013 Geneva Motor Show named the Adam Rocks.

In February 2014, Vauxhall revealed its version of the Adam Rocks, ahead of the public debut at the Geneva Motor Show in March.

== Awards ==
The Opel Adam won the Red Dot Car Design Award in April 2013. In November 2012, Auto Zeitung readers in Germany voted for Opel Adam as the number one city car. In the 38th Readers’ Choice Award of the trade magazine Auto Motor und Sport, the car won the mini car category with 24.2 percent of the votes, beating the Volkswagen Up (23.9 percent) and the Mini (16.6 percent).

== Engines ==
From launch, there were a choice of two engines: 1.2 L 70PS (124 g/km CO_{2}), and 1.4 L with 87 PS and 100 PS (129 g/km CO_{2}). All engines are available in ecoFLEX mode with lower CO_{2} emission, 1.2 ecoFLEX with 118 g/km and 1.4s with 119 g/km. From spring 2014, Opel introduced a 1.0 three cylinder SIDI Turbo engine.

Petrol engines
Model	Engine	Displacement	Power	Torque	CO_{2} (g/km)	Year
1.2 ecoFLEX S/S	I4	1,229 cc	70 PS (51 kW; 69 hp) @5,600 rpm	115 N⋅m (85 lb⋅ft) @4,000 rpm	115	2012–2019
1.4 ecoFLEX S/S	I4	1,398 cc	87 PS (64 kW; 86 hp) @6,000 rpm	130 N⋅m (96 lb⋅ft) @4,000 rpm	119	2012–2019
1.4 ecoFLEX S/S	I4	1,398 cc	100 PS (74 kW; 99 hp) @6,000 rpm	130 N⋅m (96 lb⋅ft) @4,000 rpm	119	2012–2019
1.0T SIDI S/S	I3	998 cc	90 PS (66 kW; 89 hp) @4,000–6,000 rpm	170 N⋅m (125 lb⋅ft) @1,800–3,600 rpm	99	2014–2019
1.0T SIDI S/S	I3	998 cc	115 PS (85 kW; 113 hp) @5,000–6,000 rpm	170 N⋅m (125 lb⋅ft) @1,800–4,700 rpm	99	2014–2019

=== Specifications ===
Model	1.6 Ecotec 16V
Number of cylinders	R4
Engine displacement (cm^{3})	1,598
Max. power (kW/PS)	103/140 at 6,500
Max. torque (Nm)	160 at 4,700
Top speed (km/h)	up to 185
Tyre pressure (psi)	29/38
Tank	42 litre
Price without VAT	24,900 EUR

(Source: Opel Magazine)

== Adam R2 ==
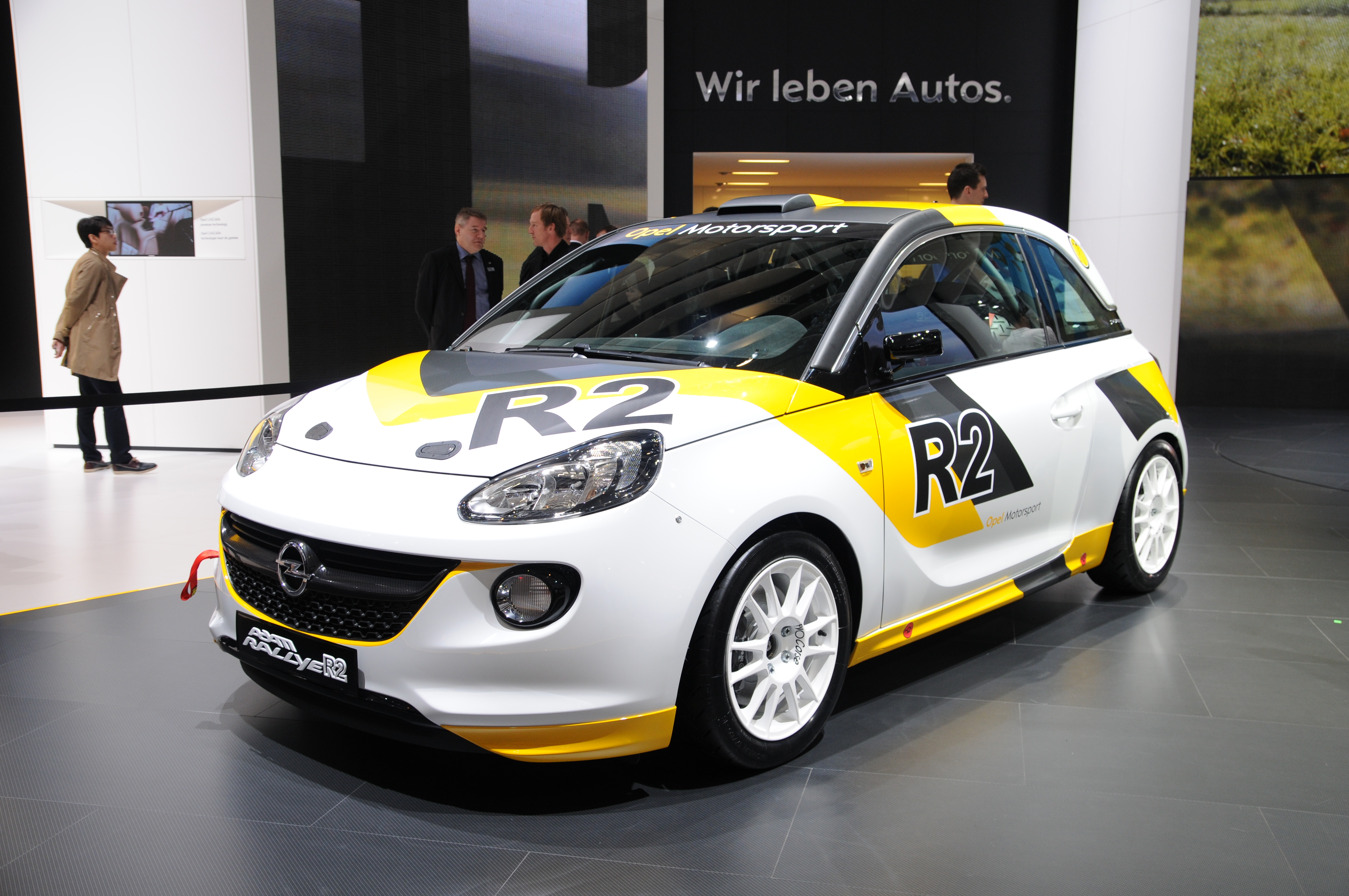
Opel Adam R2 (rally car)

Opel presented the study of the Adam R2 for the FIA Rally Regulations R2 at the 2013 Geneva Motor Show in Switzerland. It is largely based on the Adam Cup. The Adam R2 is powered by a 1.6 litre naturally aspirated engine making 182 hp (136 kW) and 140 lb⋅ft (190 N⋅m) of torque. Three cars were entered into the 2015 European Rally Championship.

=== Adam S ===
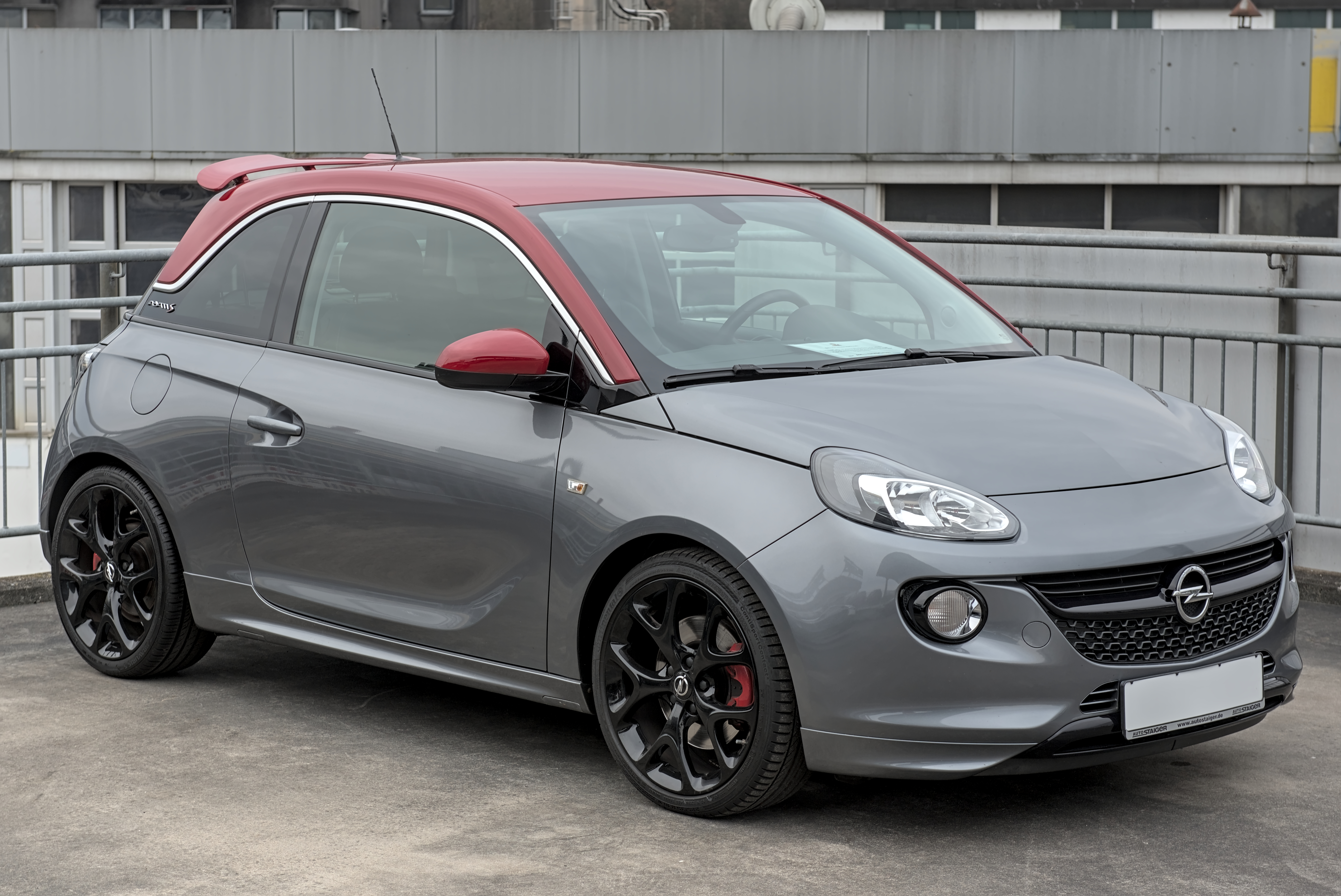
Opel Adam S

In 2014, Opel presented a road-legal sport version of the Adam R2 Rally Car – the Opel Adam S – powered by a 1.4 L turbocharged engine which produces 150 hp (112 kW), allowing it to accelerate from 0–100 km/h (62 mph) in 8.5 seconds.

== Sales ==
Opel had planned to sell between 40,000 and 50,000 units a year in Europe, and sold over 45,000 in its first year, though sales were still in start up mode in the first two months of 2013. Year over year, sales increased every month in the first four months of 2014.

The Opel Adam was not sold in CIS countries. Singapore and Chile were one of the few markets outside Europe which sold the Opel Adam.

Calendar year	Europe
2012	429
2013	45,756
2014	54,207
2015	55,278
2016	52,938
2017	48,181
2018	41,817
2019	31,129
