= Rhys Yates =

British rally driver

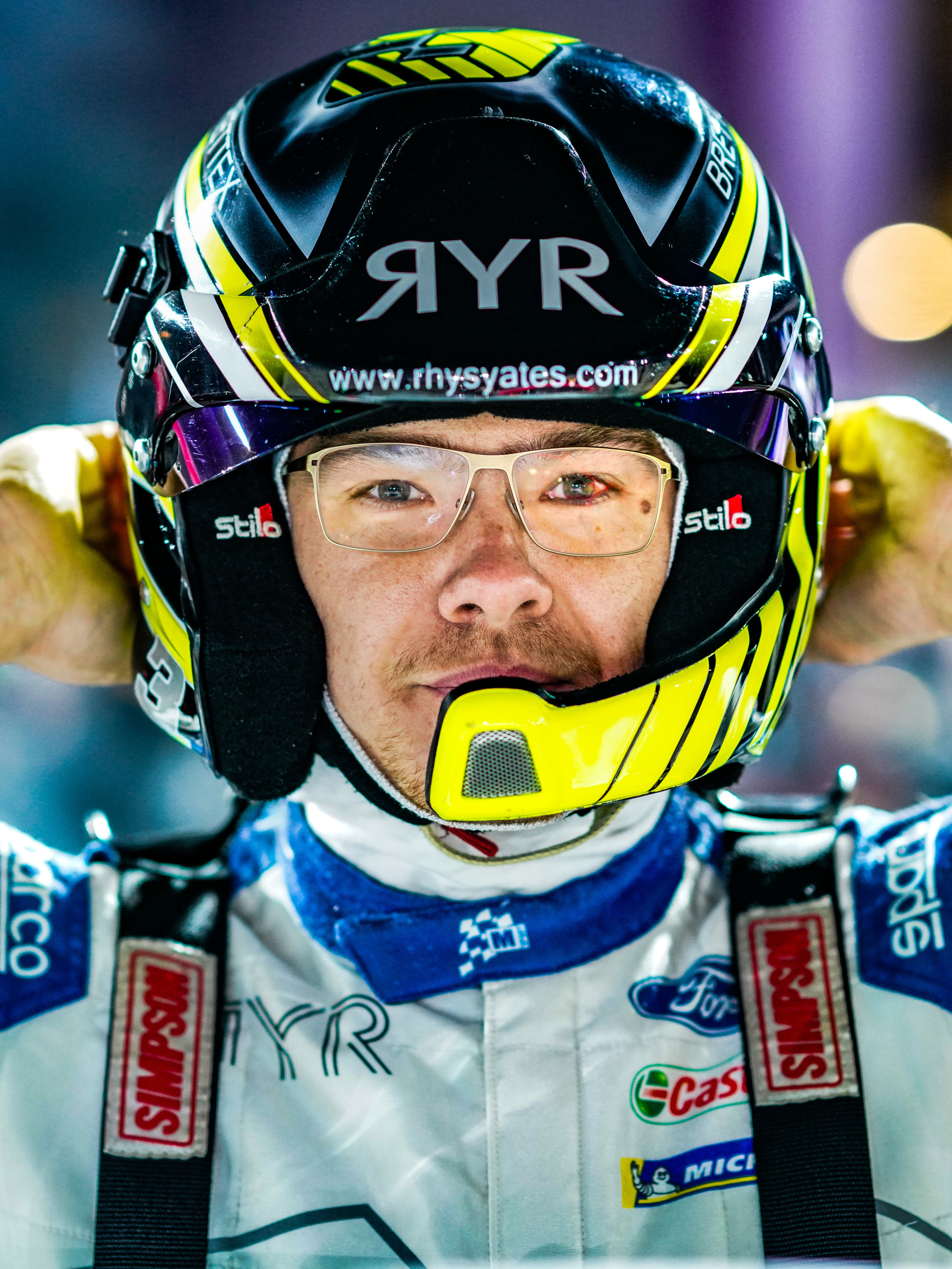
- Rhys Yates in 2020

Personal information
- Nationality: English
- Born: 6 May 1992 (age 34); England

World Rally Championship record
- Years active: 2016-present
- Co-driver: James Morgan
- Teams: M-Sport World Rally Team
- Rallies: 13
- Championships: 0
- Rally wins: 0
- Podiums: 0
- Stage wins: 0
- Total points: 0
- First rally: 2016 Wales Rally GB
- Last rally: 2020 Rally Sweden
- Last updated on: 16.4.2020.

Rhys Yates (born 6 May 1992) is a British rally driver competing in WRC-2 for M-Sport Ford World Rally Team in a Ford Fiesta R5 Mk. II.

== Early life ==
Rhys Yates was born on 6 May 1992 in England. His father, John Yates, and brother James are also drivers.

== Rally career ==
Yates started in motorcycle racing and motocross before switching to rallying in 2013.

Yates joined multiple World Rally Championship-winning squad M-Sport Ford World Rally Team for the 2020 season, where he would drive a latest-specification, factory-prepared and run Ford Fiesta R5 Mk. II. He opened his account with a fourth-place at the 2020 Monte Carlo Rally.

When the COVID-19 pandemic hit the UK in 2020-2021, and in-person competitions ceased. Yates stepped into sim racing, taking on more experienced eGamers to win the World Rally Championship's Esports WRC Shootout.

Yates currently participates in the British Rally Championship, using a M-Sport prepared Ford Fiesta Rally2

== Career results ==
=== WRC results ===
Year	Entrant	Car	1	2	3	4	5	6	7	8	9	10	11	12	13	14	WDC	Points
2016	M-Sport World Rally Team	Ford Fiesta R5	MON	SWE	MEX	ARG	POR	ITA	POL	FIN	GER	CHN; C	FRA	ESP	GBR; 32	AUS	NC	0
2017	Gemini Clinic Rally Team	Ford Fiesta R5	MON	SWE	MEX	FRA	ARG	POR	ITA	POL	FIN	GER	ESP; 34	GBR; 46	AUS		NC	0
2018	Rhys Yates	Škoda Fabia R5	SWE	MEX	FRA	ARG	POR	ITA	FIN	GER	TUR	GBR; Ret					NC	0
2018	Toksport WRT	Škoda Fabia R5											ESP; 29	AUS			NC	0
2019	Rhys Yates	Škoda Fabia R5	MON; 14	SWE; 25	MEX	FRA; 15	ARG	CHL	ITA	POR; 25	FIN	GER; 22	TUR	GBR; 25	ESP	AUS; C	NC	0
2020	M-Sport Ford WRT	Ford Fiesta R5 Mk. II	MON; 19	SWE; 19	MEX	EST	TUR	ITA	MNZ								NC	0

* Season still in progress

=== WRC-2 results ===
Year	Entrant	Car	1	2	3	4	5	6	7	8	9	10	11	12	13	14	WDC	Points
2016	M-Sport World Rally Team	Ford Fiesta R5	MON	SWE	MEX	ARG	POR	ITA	POL	FIN	GER	CHN; C	FRA	ESP	GBR; 11	AUS	NC	0
2017	Gemini Clinic Rally Team	Ford Fiesta R5	MON	SWE	MEX	FRA	ARG	POR	ITA	POL	FIN	GER	ESP; 11	GBR; 19	AUS		NC	0
2018	Rhys Yates	Škoda Fabia R5	SWE	MEX	FRA	ARG	POR	ITA	FIN	GER	TUR	GBR; Ret					NC	0
2018	Toksport WRT	Škoda Fabia R5											ESP; 13	AUS			NC	0
2019	Rhys Yates	Škoda Fabia R5	MON; 4	SWE; 10	MEX	FRA; 5	ARG	CHL	ITA	POR; 15	FIN	GER; 7	TUR	GBR; 10	ESP	AUS; C	16th	30
2020	M-Sport Ford WRT	Ford Fiesta R5 Mk. II	MON; 4	SWE; 5	MEX	EST	TUR	ITA	MNZ								7th	22

* Season still in progress
