= Pirelli Richard Burns Foundation Rally =

The Pirelli Richard Burns Foundation Rally (formerly the Pirelli International Rally) is a rallying race organised by the Cumberland Sporting Car Club that takes place in Cumbria, England, United Kingdom since 1992. Based in the Kielder Forest complex near Carlisle, it features a mixture of fast open sprints across farmland and twisty forest tracks.

== Features of the event ==
- New Saturday / Sunday format
- Saturday morning scrutineering option
- More compact route than previous years
- Option for Challengers to enter an event that will run on Sunday
- Students from Burnley College assisted a professional motorsport team in preparing their Škoda Fabia S2000 for a national rally. The project provided hands-on engineering experience for the students.

== Brief description ==
Using the infamous Kielder Forest complex, the event begins in Carlisle town centre at mid-day on Saturday running into the evening, restarting on Sunday morning with a mid-day finish at the Racecourse.

The event was cancelled in 2020 and 2021 due to the COVID-19 pandemic.

== Winners ==
Year	Driver	Co-driver	Car
2022	(United Kingdom) Elliot Payne	(United Kingdom) Patrick Walsh	Ford Fiesta Rally2
2019	(United Kingdom) Tom Cave	(United Kingdom) Dale Bowen	Hyundai i20 R5
2018	(United Kingdom) Matt Edwards	(United Kingdom) Darren Garrod	Ford Fiesta R5
2017	(Sweden) Fredrik Åhlin	(Norway) Torstein Eriksen	Škoda Fabia R5
2016	(Sweden) Fredrik Åhlin	(Norway) Morten Erik Abrahamsen	Ford Fiesta R5
2014	(United Kingdom) Osian Pryce	(United Kingdom) Dale Furniss	Citroën DS3 R3T
2013	(Finland) Jukka Korhonen	(Finland) Marko Salminen	Citroën DS3 R3T
2012	(Republic of Ireland) Keith Cronin	(United Kingdom) Marshall Clarke	Citroën DS3 R3T
2011	(United Kingdom) David Bogie	(United Kingdom) Kevin Rae	Mitsubishi Lancer Evo IX
2010	(United Kingdom) Gwyndaf Evans	(United Kingdom) Chris Patterson	Mitsubishi Lancer Evo X
2009	(Republic of Ireland) Keith Cronin	(Republic of Ireland) Greg Shinnors	Mitsubishi Lancer Evo IX
2008	(United Kingdom) Guy Wilks	(United Kingdom) Phil Pugh	Mitsubishi Lancer Evo IX
2007	(United Kingdom) Guy Wilks	(United Kingdom) Phil Pugh	Mitsubishi Lancer Evo IX
2006	(United Kingdom) Ryan Champion	(United Kingdom) Craig Thorley	Mitsubishi Lancer Evo IX
2005	(United Kingdom) Mark Higgins	(United Kingdom) Bryan Thomas	Ford Focus RS WRC '01
2004	(United Kingdom) David Higgins	(United Kingdom) Chris Wood	Hyundai Accent WRC
2003	(Finland) Tapio Laukkanen	(Finland) Miikka Anttila	Subaru Impreza S5 WRC '99
2002	(United Kingdom) Mark Higgins	(United Kingdom) Michael Gibson	Ford Focus RS WRC '01
2000	(Finland) Marko Ipatti	(Finland) Kari Kajula	Mitsubishi Lancer Evo VI
1999	(Finland) Tapio Laukkanen	(Finland) Kaj Lindström	Renault Mégane Maxi
1998	(United Kingdom) Gwyndaf Evans	(United Kingdom) Howard Davies	SEAT Ibiza
1997	(United Kingdom) Robbie Head	(United Kingdom) Bryan Thomas	Renault Mégane Maxi
1996	(United Kingdom) Alister McRae	(United Kingdom) David Senior	Ford Escort RS Cosworth
1995	(Finland) Ari Vatanen	(Italy) Fabrizia Pons	Ford Escort RS Cosworth
1994	(United Kingdom) Malcolm Wilson	(United Kingdom) Bryan Thomas	Ford Escort RS Cosworth
1993	(United Kingdom) Richard Burns	(United Kingdom) Robert Reid	Subaru Legacy RS
1992	(United Kingdom) Colin McRae	(United Kingdom) Derek Ringer	Subaru Legacy RS
