= 2010 Rally Isle of Man =

2010 Rally Isle of Man 47th Rally Isle of Man
Round 4 of the 2010 British Rally Championship
← Previous event	Next event →
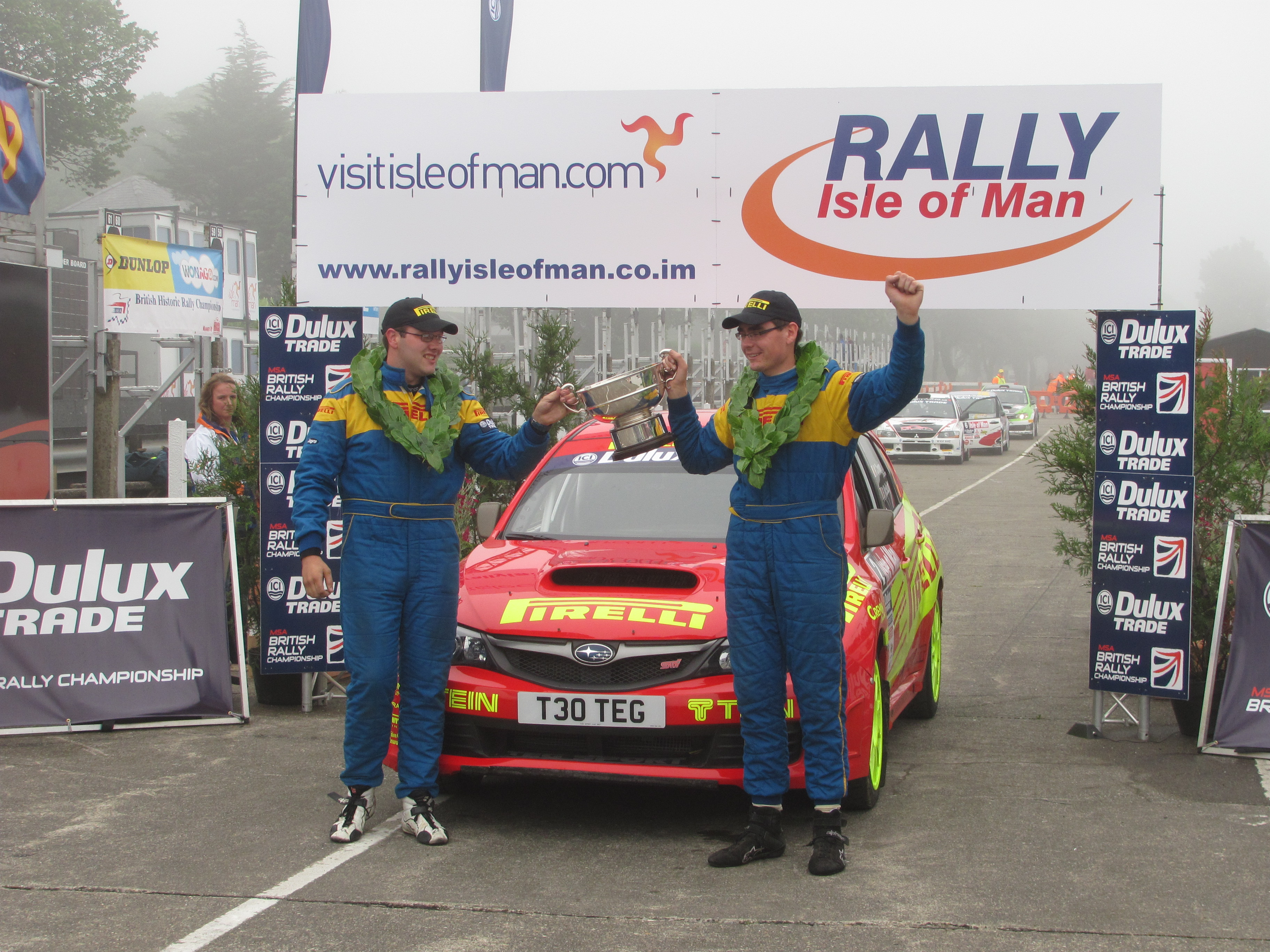
- Keith Cronin and navigator Barry McNulty, 2010 international section winners at the TT Grandstand finish-line presentation
- Host country: Isle of Man
- Rally base: Douglas
- Dates run: July 8 – 10 2010
- Stages: 21 (246.21 km; 152.99 miles)
- Stage surface: Tarmac

Statistics
- Crews: 34 at start, 20 at finish

Overall results
- Overall winner: Keith Cronin; Pirelli TEG Sport

The 2010 Rally Isle of Man was held between July 8–10, 2010. It was the 47th Rally Isle of Man, the fourth round of the 2010 MSA British Rally Championship and the fifth round of the 2010 MSA British Historic Rally Championship.

== Results ==
=== Special stages ===
Day	Stage	Time	Name	Length	Winner	Time	Avg. spd.	Rally leader
1 (9 July)	SS1	10:33	Governors	0.80 miles	(United Kingdom) Alastair Fisher	0' 58.3	49.40 mph	(United Kingdom) Alastair Fisher
1 (9 July)	SS2	11:13	Dog Mills	12.37 miles	(United Kingdom) Gwyndaf Evans	10:07.1	73.35 mph	(United Kingdom) Gwyndaf Evans
1 (9 July)	SS3	11:54	Druidale	5.00 miles	(United Kingdom) Gwyndaf Evans	4:22.1	68.68 mph	(United Kingdom) Gwyndaf Evans
1 (9 July)	SS4	13:28	Slieau Whallian 1	3.88 miles	(Republic of Ireland) Keith Cronin	3:22.1	69.11 mph	(United Kingdom) Gwyndaf Evans
1 (9 July)	SS5	13:56	Corlea 1	6.89 miles	(Republic of Ireland) Keith Cronin	5:48.5	71.17 mph	(United Kingdom) Gwyndaf Evans
1 (9 July)	SS6	14:11	Ballanank 1	17.30 miles	(Republic of Ireland) Keith Cronin	14:28.3	71.73 mph	(Republic of Ireland) Keith Cronin
1 (9 July)	SS7	16:13	Staarvey 1	7.22 miles	(United Kingdom) Adam Gould	6:32.9	66.16 mph	(Republic of Ireland) Keith Cronin
1 (9 July)	SS8	16:44	The Cronk 1	8.67 miles	(United Kingdom) Gwyndaf Evans	8:08.5	63.95 mph	(Republic of Ireland) Keith Cronin
1 (9 July)	SS9	17:09	Tholt-y-Will 1	4.69 miles	(United Kingdom) Gwyndaf Evans	4:06.1	68.60 mph	(Republic of Ireland) Keith Cronin
1 (9 July)	SS10	18:48	Marine Drive	5.07 miles	(United Kingdom) Gwyndaf Evans	4:41.6	64.81 mph	(Republic of Ireland) Keith Cronin
1 (9 July)	SS11	19:13	Castletown 1	1.26 miles	(United Kingdom) Gwyndaf Evans	1:27.9	51.60 mph	(Republic of Ireland) Keith Cronin
1 (9 July)	SS12	19:30	Castletown 2	1.26 miles	(United Kingdom) Gwyndaf Evans	1:27.4	51.89 mph	(Republic of Ireland) Keith Cronin
1 (9 July)	SS13	20:03	West Baldwin	11.65 miles	(Republic of Ireland) Keith Cronin	10:21.5	67.48 mph	(Republic of Ireland) Keith Cronin
2 (10 July)	SS14	09:40	The Cronk 2	8.67 miles	(Republic of Ireland) Keith Cronin	8:00.7	64.93 mph	(Republic of Ireland) Keith Cronin
2 (10 July)	SS15	10:17	Glascoe	5.79 miles	(United Kingdom) Gwyndaf Evans	4:52.2	71.33 mph	(Republic of Ireland) Keith Cronin
2 (10 July)	SS16	10:38	Tholt-y-Will 2	4.69 miles	(United Kingdom) Gwyndaf Evans	4:00.3	70.26 mph	(Republic of Ireland) Keith Cronin
2 (10 July)	SS17	12:08	Slieau Whallian 2	3.88 miles	(United Kingdom) Gwyndaf Evans	3:43.6	62.47 mph	(Republic of Ireland) Keith Cronin
2 (10 July)	SS18	12:23	Corlea 2	6.89 miles	(Republic of Ireland) Keith Cronin	6:52.0	60.20 mph	(Republic of Ireland) Keith Cronin
2 (10 July)	SS19	12:51	Ballanank 2	17.30 miles	(Republic of Ireland) Keith Cronin	15:34.0	66.68 mph	(Republic of Ireland) Keith Cronin
2 (10 July)	SS20	14:56	Staarvey 2	7.22 miles	(United Kingdom) Jonathan Greer	6:29.2	66.78 mph	(Republic of Ireland) Keith Cronin
2 (10 July)	SS21	15:31	Baldwin Classic	13.27 miles	(United Kingdom) Gwyndaf Evans	12:20.4	64.52 mph	(Republic of Ireland) Keith Cronin

=== Final Classification ===
Pos.	Driver	Co-driver	Car	Time	Difference	Points
Isle of Man International Rally (BRC)
1.	(Republic of Ireland) Keith Cronin	(Republic of Ireland) Barry McNulty	Subaru Impreza N15	2:19.00.3	0.0	20
2.	(United Kingdom) Gwyndaf Evans	(United Kingdom) Gareth Roberts	Mitsubishi Evo 9	2:23.51.7	1:38.4	18
3.	(United Kingdom) Jason Pritchard	(United Kingdom) Robbie Durant	Subaru Impreza N16	2:44.12.5	4:51.4	16
4.	(United Kingdom) Jonathan Greer	(United Kingdom) Gordon Noble	Mitsubishi Evo 9	2:24.41.5	5:41.2	15
5.	(Finland) Jarkko Nikara	(Finland) Petri Nikara	Renault Twingo R2	2:29.36.7	10:36.4	14
6.	(United Kingdom) Dave Weston, Jr.	(United Kingdom) Ieuan Thomas	Subaru Impreza N16	2:29.36.8	10:36.5	13
7.	(Finland) Matti Rantanen	(Finland) Mikko Lukka	Renault Twingo R2	2:29.59.8	10:59.5	12
8.	(United Kingdom) Elfyn Evans	(United Kingdom) Andrew Edwards	Ford Fiesta R2	2:30.03.9	11:03.6	10
9.	(United Kingdom) Euan Thorburn	(United Kingdom) Paul Beaton	Mitsubishi Evo 9	2:54.30.5	11:18.3	9
10.	(Republic of Ireland) Robert Barrable	(Republic of Ireland) Damien Connolly	Citroën C2 R2 Max	2:30.20.9	11:20.6	8

== 2010 British Rally Championship Drivers' championship (after 4 rounds of 6) ==
Pos	Driver	BUL (Wales)	PIR (England)	JCR (Scotland)	IOM (Isle of Man)	ULS (Northern Ireland)	YOR (England)	Pts
1	(United Kingdom) Jonathan Greer	5	2	4	4			62
2	(United Kingdom) Gwyndaf Evans	Ret	1	1	2			58
3	(Republic of Ireland) Keith Cronin	1	Ret	3	1			56
4	(United Kingdom) Jason Pritchard	7	6	5	3			55
5	(United Kingdom) Dave Weston, Jr.	2	Ret	8	6			42
6	(United Kingdom) Adam Gould	3	10	6	Ret			38
7	(Iceland) Daníel Sigurðarson	8	4	7	Ret			38
8	(Finland) Jarkko Nikara	13	7	14	5			38
9	(United Kingdom) Elfyn Evans	9	9	13	8			37
10	(Republic of Ireland) Robert Barrable	15	12	9	10			31
11	(United Kingdom) Euan Thorburn	4	14	DNS	9			30
12	(United Kingdom) Mark Donnelly	11	17	11	12			27
13	(United Kingdom) Alan Cookson	Ret	8	10	Ret			20
14	(Finland) Matti Rantanen	Ret	Ret	12	7			19
15	(United Kingdom) Alastair Fisher	Ret	Ret	2	Ret			18
16	(United Kingdom) Max Utting	14	15	16	16			17
17	(Republic of Ireland) Craig Breen	Ret	3	Ret				16
18	(Republic of Ireland) Owen Murphy	Ret	5	Ret				14
19	(United Kingdom) Darren Gass	6						13
20	(Finland) Mikko Pajunen	17	11	19	Ret			12
21	(Australia) Molly Taylor	18	19	17	14			5
22	(United Kingdom) John MacCrone	24	Ret	23	13			9
23	(United Kingdom) David Bogie	12	Ret					8
24	(Republic of Ireland) Joe McGonigle	19	16	15	Ret			8
25	(United Kingdom) Luke Pinder	20	13	Ret				7
26	(United Kingdom) Peter Taylor	Ret	18	Ret	15			6
27	(United Kingdom) Steve Graham	25	21	21	20			5
28	(Kenya) Peter Horsey	16						4
29	(United Kingdom) David Harrison	23	Ret		18			4
30	(United Kingdom) John Boyd	21	Ret	18				2
31	(United Kingdom) Tom Clark			20	Ret			1
32	(United Kingdom) Spencer Wilkinson	22	Ret					1
Pos	Driver	BUL (Wales)	PIR (England)	JCR (Scotland)	IOM (Isle of Man)	ULS (Northern Ireland)	YOR (England)	Pts

Key
Colour	Result
Gold	Winner
Silver	2nd place
Bronze	3rd place
Green	Non-podium finish
Purple	Did not finish (Ret)
Black	Disqualified (DSQ)
Black	Excluded (EXC)
White	Did not start (DNS)
*	Joker played
