= 2010 Rally Yorkshire =

2010 International Rally Yorkshire
Round 6 of the 2010 British Rally Championship
← Previous event
- Host country: (United Kingdom) North Yorkshire
- Rally base: Scarborough
- Dates run: 24 – 25 September 2010
- Stages: 8 (137.24 km; 85.28 miles)
- Stage surface: Gravel

Statistics
- Crews: 31 at start, 20 at finish

Overall results
- Overall winner: (United Kingdom) Gwyndaf Evans (United Kingdom) JR Motorsports

2010 International Rally Yorkshire was held on 24–25 September 2010. The Rally headquarters were located in Scarborough, North Yorkshire and was organised by the Trackrod Motor Club. The 2010 International Rally Yorkshire was the final round of the 2010 MSA British Rally Championship and the seventh round of the 2010 MSA British Historic Rally Championship.

== Results ==
=== Event standings ===
| Pos. | Driver | Co-driver | Car | Time | Difference | Points |
|---|---|---|---|---|---|---|
| 1. | (United Kingdom) Gwyndaf Evans | (United Kingdom) Claire Mole | Mitsubishi Lancer Evolution X | 1:18:27.6 | 0.0 | 30 |
| 2. | (United Kingdom) Alastair Fisher | (Republic of Ireland) Rory Kennedy | Mitsubishi Lancer Evolution X | 1:19:09.1 | 41.5 | 27 |
| 3. | (Republic of Ireland) Keith Cronin | (Republic of Ireland) Barry McNulty | Subaru Impreza N15 | 1:19:38.0 | 1:10.4 | 24 |
| 4. | (Republic of Ireland) Daniel McKenna | (Republic of Ireland) Andrew Grennan | Mitsubishi Lancer Evolution IX | 1:20:54.9 | 2:27.3 | 22.5 |
| 5. | (United Kingdom) Jason Pritchard | (United Kingdom) Robbie Durant | Subaru Impreza N16 | 1:21:43.6 | 3:16.0 | 21 |
| 6. | (Iceland) Daníel Sigurðarson | (Iceland) Ásta Sigurdardottir | Mitsubishi Lancer Evolution X | 1:22:12.7 | 3:45.1 | 19.5 |
| 7. | (United Kingdom) Alan Cookson | (United Kingdom) Julian Wilkinson | Subaru Impreza N15 | 1:25:10.1 | 6:42.5 | 18 |
| 8. | (Republic of Ireland) Craig Breen | (United Kingdom) Gareth Roberts | Ford Fiesta S2000 | 1:27:20.1 | 8:52.5 | 16.5 |
| 9. | (Finland) Mikko Pajunen | (Finland) Janne Perälä | Ford Fiesta R2 | 1:27:39.5 | 9:11.9 | 15 |
| 10. | (Republic of Ireland) Robert Barrable | (Republic of Ireland) Damien Connolly | Citroen C2R2 Max | 1:29:15.3 | 10:47.7 | 13.5 |

=== Special stages ===
| Day | Stage | Time | Name | Length | Winner | Time | Avg. spd. | Rally leader |
|---|---|---|---|---|---|---|---|---|
| 1 (24 Sep) | SS1 | 19:59 | Langdale 1 | 16.36 miles | (Republic of Ireland) Craig Breen | 14:00.1 | 70.11 mph | (Republic of Ireland) Craig Breen |
| 2 (25 Sep) | SS2 | 11:39 | Housedale 1 | 10.25 miles | (Republic of Ireland) Craig Breen | 10:05.8 | 60.91 mph | (Republic of Ireland) Craig Breen |
| 2 (25 Sep) | SS3 | 12:07 | Givendale 1 | 10.05 miles | (United Kingdom) Alastair Fisher | 8:40.5 | 69.51 mph | (United Kingdom) Gwyndaf Evans |
| 2 (25 Sep) | SS4 | 12:45 | Staindale 1 | 5.98 miles | (United Kingdom) Gwyndaf Evans | 6:09.7 | 58.23 mph | (United Kingdom) Gwyndaf Evans |
| 2 (25 Sep) | SS5 | 15:13 | Langdale 2 | 16.36 miles | (United Kingdom) Gwyndaf Evans | 14:02.0 | 69.95 mph | (United Kingdom) Gwyndaf Evans |
| 2 (25 Sep) | SS6 | 16:01 | Staindale 2 | 5.98 miles | (United Kingdom) Alastair Fisher | 6:08.5 | 58.42 mph | (United Kingdom) Gwyndaf Evans |
| 2 (25 Sep) | SS7 | 16:44 | Housedale 2 | 10.25 miles | (United Kingdom) Gwyndaf Evans | 10:09.6 | 60.53 mph | (United Kingdom) Gwyndaf Evans |
| 2 (25 Sep) | SS8 | 17:12 | Givendale 2 | 10.05 miles | (United Kingdom) Gwyndaf Evans | 8:36.7 | 70.02 mph | (United Kingdom) Gwyndaf Evans |
