= Jim Clark Rally =

Rallying race held in the Scottish Borders

- Part of the British Rally Championship
- Host country: Scotland
- Rally base: Kelso, Berwickshire
- Stage surface: Tarmac

The Jim Clark Rally is a rallying race held in the Scottish Borders, Scotland, United Kingdom. It was first held in 1970, and is named after 1963 and 1965 Formula One champion Jim Clark. It has been a prominent round of the British Rally Championship since its debut in the series in 1999.

The 2014 rally was stopped after the deaths of three spectators, and cancelled for 2015. The organisers announced in November 2015 that the event would be reinstated for 2016 in some form. It was cancelled in 2016 however, due to low entries. The Motor Sports Authority refused the rally a permit for 2017. The event returned to the British Rally Championship in 2022. The 2025 rally was abandoned on day 2, due to an accident that involved the death of a co-driver. The driver was taken to hospital in Edinburgh with serious injuries.

== Events ==
Jim Clark Rally: 31 May/1 June, round three and the first asphalt event of the 2013 MSA British Rally Championship, featuring 130 stage and 250 road miles.

Jim Clark Challenge Rally: 31 May/ 1 June, round three, the first asphalt event of the 2013 NGK Spark Plugs BRC Challenge, features approx 75 stage and 130 road miles.

Recce dates: Either Sun 26 May or Thurs 30 May for both Championships Shakedown date / time: Friday 31 May 10am to 12 am Start location: Duns Town Centre on Friday evening for both. Finish Location: Duns Town Centre on Sat afternoon for BRC and teatime for BRC Rally Guide 1 issue date: February 2013 Scrutineering: Friday morning Service Area Location(s): Kelso HQ Service Area with remote for BRC only in Duns

Features of the event:

Only mainland UK rally to close public roads Town centre start and spectator stage in Duns Podium restart on Saturday in Duns for leg 2 Return of the sensational Langton water splash stage Podium finish in Duns on Saturday for both Championships

== Winners ==
2026	(United Kingdom) Max McRae	(United Kingdom) Cameron Fair	Škoda Fabia RS Rally2
2025	Cancelled because of an incident		
2024	(Republic of Ireland) Keith Cronin	(Republic of Ireland) Mikie Galvin	Ford Fiesta Rally 2
2023	(France) Adrien Fourmaux	(France) Alexandre Coria	Ford Fiesta Rally2
2022	(Republic of Ireland) Keith Cronin	(Republic of Ireland) Mikie Galvin	Volkswagen Polo GTI R5
2021	Cancelled COVID-19 pandemic		
2020	Cancelled COVID-19 pandemic		
2019	(Republic of Ireland) Josh Moffett	(Republic of Ireland) Andy Hayes	Ford Fiesta R5 Mk. II
2014	(Republic of Ireland) Daniel McKenna	(Republic of Ireland) Arthur Kierans	Citroën DS3 R3T
2013	(Finland) Jukka Korhonen	(Finland) Marko Salminen	Citroën DS3 R3T
2012	(Republic of Ireland) Keith Cronin	(United Kingdom) Marshall Clarke	Citroën DS3 R3T
2011	(United Kingdom) David Bogie	(United Kingdom) Kevin Rae	Mitsubishi Lancer Evo IX
2010	(United Kingdom) Gwyndaf Evans	(United Kingdom) Chris Patterson	Mitsubishi Lancer Evo X
2009	(United Kingdom) Eugene Donnelly	(United Kingdom) Paddy Toner	Škoda Fabia WRC
2008	(Republic of Ireland) Eamonn Boland	(Republic of Ireland) Damien Morrissey	Subaru Impreza S12B WRC '07
2007	(United Kingdom) Eugene Donnelly	(Republic of Ireland) Paul Kiely	Subaru Impreza S12 WRC '06
2006	(Republic of Ireland) Derek McGarrity	(Republic of Ireland) Dairmuid Falvey	Subaru Impreza S10 WRC '04
2005	(United Kingdom) Mark Higgins	(United Kingdom) Bryan Thomas	Ford Focus RS WRC '01
2004	(United Kingdom) Andrew Nesbitt	(Republic of Ireland) James O'Brien	Subaru Impreza S9 WRC '03
2003	(United Kingdom) Andrew Nesbitt	(Republic of Ireland) James O'Brien	Subaru Impreza S7 WRC '01
2002	(United Kingdom) Andrew Nesbitt	(Republic of Ireland) James O'Brien	Subaru Impreza S6 WRC '00
2001	(United Kingdom) Martin Rowe	(United Kingdom) Chris Wood	Ford Puma S1600
2000	(United Kingdom) Mark Higgins	(United Kingdom) Bryan Thomas	Vauxhall Astra Kit Car
1999	(Finland) Tapio Laukkanen	(Finland) Kaj Lindström	Renault Mégane Maxi
1998	(United Kingdom) Dominic Buckley	(United Kingdom) Neil Ewing	Subaru Impreza
1997	(United Kingdom) Robbie Head	(United Kingdom) Bryan Thomas	Renault Mégane
1996	(United Kingdom) Andy Horne	(United Kingdom) Jim Howie	MG Metro 6R4
1995	(United Kingdom) John Baird	(United Kingdom) Martin Forrest	Ford Escort Cosworth
1994	(United Kingdom) Mike Horne	(United Kingdom) Monty Pearson	Ford Sierra Cosworth
1993	(United Kingdom) Murray Grierson	(United Kingdom) Stewart Merry	MG Metro 6R4
1992	(United Kingdom) Raymond Munro	(United Kingdom) Neil Ewing	Ford Sierra Cosworth
1991	(United Kingdom) Murray Grierson	(United Kingdom) Stewart Merry	MG Metro 6R4
1990	(United Kingdom) Richard Wheeler	(United Kingdom) Steve Sladdin	Ford Escort RS
1989	(United Kingdom) Steve Bannister	(United Kingdom) Dave Oldfield	Ford Escort RS
1988	(United Kingdom) Pete Slights	(United Kingdom) Lou Naylor	MG Metro 6R4
1987	(United Kingdom) Steve Whiteford	(United Kingdom) Dave Adams	MG Metro 6R4
1986	(United Kingdom) Richard Mawson	(United Kingdom) George Tindall	Ford Escort RS1800
1985	(United Kingdom) Bill Lymburn	(United Kingdom) Alan Hutchinson	Ford Escort RS1800
1984	(United Kingdom) Dominic Buckley	(United Kingdom) Doug Redpath	Ford Escort RS1800
1983	(United Kingdom) Andrew Wood	(United Kingdom) Robin Wood	Talbot Sunbeam
1982	(United Kingdom) Ivor Clark	(United Kingdom) George Blackie	Talbot Sunbeam
1981	(United Kingdom) Ian Wilson	(United Kingdom) Neil Turner	Talbot Sunbeam
1980	(United Kingdom) Terry Kaby	(United Kingdom) Brian Rainbow	Vauxhall Chevette
1979	Cancelled		
1978	(United Kingdom) Nigel Rockey	(United Kingdom) Brian Harris	Ford Escort RS1800
1977	(United Kingdom) Russell Brookes	(United Kingdom) John Brown	Ford Escort RS1800
1976	(Finland) Ari Vatanen	(United Kingdom) Peter Bryant	Ford Escort Mark 1
1975	(Republic of Ireland) Billy Coleman	(Republic of Ireland) Dan O'Sullivan	Ford Escort Mark 1
1974	(United Kingdom) Roger Clark	(United Kingdom) Jim Porter	Ford Escort Mark 1
1973	(United Kingdom) Roger Clark	(United Kingdom) Tony Mason	Ford Escort Mark 1
1972	(United Kingdom) Roger Clark	(United Kingdom) Jim Porter	Ford Escort Mark 1
1971	(United Kingdom) Donald Heggie	(United Kingdom) George Dean	Ford Escort Mark 1
1970	(United Kingdom) Russell Close	(United Kingdom) Howard Scott	Ford Escort Mark 1

== Multiple winners ==
Name	Wins
Dom Buckley	1984, 1998
Roger Clark	1972, 1973, 1974
Keith Cronin	2012, 2022, 2024
Eugene Donnelly	2007, 2009
Murray Grierson	1991, 1993
Andrew Nesbitt	2002, 2003, 2004
Mark Higgins	2000, 2005
