= 2010 Ulster Rally =

Motor rally in Antrim, Northern Ireland

2010 Ulster Rally 35th Ulster Rally
Round 5 of the 2010 British Rally Championship
← Previous event	Next event →
- Host country: (United Kingdom) Northern Ireland
- Rally base: Antrim, County Antrim
- Dates run: August 20 – 21 2010
- Stages: 14 (202.73 km; 125.97 miles)
- Stage surface: Tarmac

Statistics
- Crews: 52 at start, 31 at finish

Overall results
- Overall winner: (Republic of Ireland) Derek McGarrity; Subaru Impreza S12B WRC (A8)

2010 Ulster Rally incorporating Rally Northern Ireland was held between 20–21 August 2010. The Rally HQ located in Antrim, County Antrim, Northern Ireland and organised by the Northern Ireland Motor Club (NIMC) The 2010 Ulster Rally was the fifth round of the 2010 MSA British Rally Championship and the sixth round of the 2010 MSA British Historic Rally Championship.

== Special Stages ==
=== Rally Northern Ireland ===
Day	Stage	Time	Name	Length	Winner	Time	Avg. spd.	Rally leader
1 (20 Aug)	SS1	14:29	Knockboy 1	9.37 miles	(United Kingdom) Gwyndaf Evans	7:04.6	79.44 mph	(United Kingdom) Gwyndaf Evans
1 (20 Aug)	SS2	15:06	Glendun 1	9.09 miles	(Republic of Ireland) Craig Breen	7:31.1	72.55 mph	(Republic of Ireland) Craig Breen
1 (20 Aug)	SS3	15:31	Torr Head 1	7.96 miles	(Republic of Ireland) Keith Cronin	7:14.2	65.99 mph	(Republic of Ireland) Craig Breen
1 (20 Aug)	SS4	18:47	Knockboy 2	9.37 miles	(Republic of Ireland) Keith Cronin	6:57.6	80.76 mph	(Republic of Ireland) Craig Breen
1 (20 Aug)	SS5	19:24	Glendun 2	9.09 miles	(Republic of Ireland) Keith Cronin	7:19.7	58.47 mph	(Republic of Ireland) Craig Breen
1 (20 Aug)	SS6	19:50	Torr Head 2	7.96 miles	(Republic of Ireland) Craig Breen	7:05.0	67.43 mph	(Republic of Ireland) Craig Breen
2 (21 Aug)	SS7	08:03	Cairncastle 1	12.54 miles	(United Kingdom) Gwyndaf Evans	9:51.6	76.31 mph	(Republic of Ireland) Craig Breen
2 (21 Aug)	SS8	08:32	Slemish 1	9.17 miles	(Republic of Ireland) Keith Cronin	6:53.8	79.78 mph	(Republic of Ireland) Craig Breen
2 (21 Aug)	SS9	10:11	Tardree 1	8.09 miles	(Republic of Ireland) Craig Breen	7:28.6	64.93 mph	(Republic of Ireland) Craig Breen
2 (21 Aug)	SS10	11:01	Langford Lodge 1	6.54 miles	(Republic of Ireland) Keith Cronin	5:03.0	77.71 mph	(Republic of Ireland) Craig Breen
2 (21 Aug)	SS11	13:08	Cairncastle 2	12.54 miles	(Republic of Ireland) Craig Breen	9:46.0	77.04 mph	(Republic of Ireland) Craig Breen
2 (21 Aug)	SS12	13:37	Slemish 2	9.17 miles	(Republic of Ireland) Craig Breen	6:53.5	79.84 mph	(Republic of Ireland) Craig Breen
2 (21 Aug)	SS13	8.09	Tardree 2	8.09 miles	(Republic of Ireland) Craig Breen	7:33.6	64.21 mph	(Republic of Ireland) Craig Breen
2 (21 Aug)	SS14	16:31	Langford Lodge 2	6.54 miles	(Republic of Ireland) Keith Cronin	5:08.2	63.98 mph	(Republic of Ireland) Craig Breen

=== Final Classification ===
Pos.	Driver	Co-driver	Car	Time	Difference	Points
Ulster Rally (WRC)
1.	(Republic of Ireland) Derek McGarrity	(Republic of Ireland) James McKee	Subaru Impreza S12B WRC	1:39.44.6	0.0	–
2.	(Republic of Ireland) Gareth MacHale	(Republic of Ireland) Brian Murphy	Ford Focus	1:39.45.7	0:0.01.1	–
3.	(Republic of Ireland) Aaron MacHale	(Republic of Ireland) Eugene O' Donnell	Ford Focus	1:43.37.0	0:03.52.4	–
4.	(Netherlands) Arjen de Koning	(Netherlands) Hein Verschuuren	Mitsubishi Lancer Evo VII	1:52.26.3	0:12.41.7	–
Rally Northern Ireland (BRC)
1.	(Republic of Ireland) Craig Breen	(United Kingdom) Gareth Roberts	Ford Fiesta S2000	1:42:09.5	0.0	20
2.	(Republic of Ireland) Keith Cronin	(United Kingdom) Barry McNulty	Subaru Impreza N15	1:43.36.5	0:01.50.9	18
3.	(United Kingdom) Alastair Fisher	(Republic of Ireland) Rory Kennedy	Mitsubishi Lancer Evo IX	1:44:00.4	0:01.50.9	16
4.	(United Kingdom) Jonathan Greer	(United Kingdom) Gordon Noble	Subaru Impreza N11	1:44.43.2	0:02.33.7	15
5.	(France) Bryan Bouffier	(Poland) Xavier Panseri	Citroën DS3 R3	1:45.12.7	0:03.03.2	14
6.	(United Kingdom) Jason Pritchard	(United Kingdom) Robbie Durant	Subaru Impreza N16	1:47.20.4	0:05.10.9	13
7.	(United Kingdom) Jonathan Greer	(United Kingdom) Dai Roberts	Mitsubishi Lancer Evo IX	1:47.37.0	0:05.27.5	12
8.	(United Kingdom) Mark Donnelly	(United Kingdom) Stephen O'Hanlon	Mitsubishi Lancer Evo IX	1:48.19.3	0:06.09.8	10
9.	(United Kingdom) Martin McCormack	(Republic of Ireland) David Moynihan	Citroën C2 R2 Max	1:49.06.5	0:06.57.0	9
10.	(United Kingdom) Alan Carmichael	(United Kingdom) Ivor Lamont	Mitsubishi Lancer Evo IX	1:49.58.2	0:07.48.7	8

== Retirements ==
Rally Northern Ireland

- (United Kingdom) Gwyndaf Evans/Phil Pugh (Mitsubishi Lancer Evo X) – Engine (SS11);
- (Australia) Molly Taylor/Coral Taylor (Citroën C2 R2 Max) – Accident (SS8);
- (United Kingdom) Dave Weston_Jnr/Ieuan Thomas (Subaru Impreza N2010) – Accident (SS1);
- (Finland) Jarkko Nikara/Petri Nikara (Renault Twingo) – Accident (SS10);
- (Finland) Mikko Pajunen/Janne Perälä (Suzuki Swift) – Accident (SS8);
- (Republic of Ireland) Robert Barrable/Damien Connolly (Citroën C2 R2 Max) – Lost Wheel (SS7);

== 2010 British Rally Championship Drivers' championship (after 5 rounds of 6) ==
Pos	Driver	BUL (Wales)	PIR (England)	JCR (Scotland)	IOM (Isle of Man)	ULS (Northern Ireland)	YOR (England)	Pts
1	(United Kingdom) Jonathan Greer	5	2	4	4	7		75
2	(Republic of Ireland) Keith Cronin	1	Ret	3	1	2		74
3	(United Kingdom) Jason Pritchard	7	6	5	3	6		69
4	(United Kingdom) Gwyndaf Evans	Ret	1	1	2	Ret		58
5	(United Kingdom) Adam Gould	3	10	6	Ret	4		53
6	(United Kingdom) Elfyn Evans	9	9	13	8	11		49
7	(Iceland) Daníel Sigurðarson	8	4	7	Ret	20		46
8	(United Kingdom) Dave Weston, Jr.	2	Ret	8	6	Ret		42
9	(Finland) Jarkko Nikara	13	7	14	5	Ret		38
10	(United Kingdom) Mark Donnelly	11	17	11	12	13		38
11	(Republic of Ireland) Craig Breen	Ret	3	Ret		1		36
12	(United Kingdom) Alastair Fisher	Ret	Ret	2	Ret	3		34
13	(Republic of Ireland) Robert Barrable	15	12	9	10	Ret		31
14	(United Kingdom) Euan Thorburn	4	14	DNS	9			30
15	(Finland) Matti Rantanen	Ret	Ret	12	7	15		29
16	(United Kingdom) Alan Cookson	Ret	8	10	Ret			20
17	(United Kingdom) John MacCrone	24	Ret	23	13	16		18
18	(United Kingdom) Max Utting	14	15	16	16			17
19	(Republic of Ireland) Owen Murphy	Ret	5	Ret				14
20	(United Kingdom) Darren Gass	6						13
21	(Finland) Mikko Pajunen	17	11	19	Ret	Ret		12
22	(United Kingdom) Steve Graham	25	21	21	20	26		5
23	(Australia) Molly Taylor	18	19	17	14	Ret		5
24	(United Kingdom) David Bogie	12	Ret					8
25	(Republic of Ireland) Joe McGonigle	19	16	15	Ret	Ret		8
26	(United Kingdom) Luke Pinder	20	13	Ret				7
27	(United Kingdom) Tom Clark			20	Ret	27		7
28	(United Kingdom) Peter Taylor	Ret	18	Ret	15			6
29	(Kenya) Peter Horsey	16						4
30	(United Kingdom) David Harrison	23	Ret		18			4
31	(United Kingdom) John Boyd	21	Ret	18				2
32	(United Kingdom) Spencer Wilkinson	22	Ret					1
Pos	Driver	BUL (Wales)	PIR (England)	JCR (Scotland)	IOM (Isle of Man)	ULS (Northern Ireland)	YOR (England)	Pts

Key
Colour	Result
Gold	Winner
Silver	2nd place
Bronze	3rd place
Green	Non-podium finish
Purple	Did not finish (Ret)
Black	Disqualified (DSQ)
Black	Excluded (EXC)
White	Did not start (DNS)
*	Joker played
