= 2010 British Rally Championship =

Seasons
- ← 2009 2011 →

The 2010 Dulux Trade MSA British Rally Championship was the 52nd season of the British Rally Championship. The season consisted of six rounds and began on 27 March, with International Rally North Wales. The season ended on 25 September at the International Rally Yorkshire. Dulux Trade was the title sponsor of the series, which is part of a two-year deal agreed in February 2010.

Irishman Keith Cronin won the championship for the second year in a row in a Subaru Impreza, taking wins in both the Bulldog and Isle of Man rallies on the way to the title.

== Calendar ==
The calendar consisted of six rounds as in 2009.

Round	Dates	Location	Rally HQ	Surface	Winner
1	27 March	Bulldog International Rally North Wales	Bala	Gravel	(Republic of Ireland) Keith Cronin
2	23–24 April	Pirelli International Rally	Carlisle	Gravel	(United Kingdom) Gwyndaf Evans
3	28–29 May	Jim Clark International Rally	Duns	Asphalt	(United Kingdom) Gwyndaf Evans
4	9–10 July	Isle of Man International Rally	Douglas	Asphalt	(Republic of Ireland) Keith Cronin
5	20–21 August	International Rally Northern Ireland	Antrim	Asphalt	(Republic of Ireland) Craig Breen
6	24–25 September	International Rally Yorkshire	Pickering	Gravel	(United Kingdom) Gwyndaf Evans

== Drivers championship standings ==
Pos	Driver	BUL	PIR	JCR	IOM	ULS	YOR	Pts
1	(Republic of Ireland) Keith Cronin	1	Ret	3	1	2	3	98
2	(United Kingdom) Gwyndaf Evans	Ret	1	1	2	Ret	1	88
3	(United Kingdom) Jason Pritchard	7	6	5	3	6	5	78
4	(United Kingdom) Jonathan Greer	5	2	4	4	7		75
5	(Iceland) Daníel Sigurðarson	8	4	7	Ret	20	6	65.5
6	(United Kingdom) Alastair Fisher	Ret	Ret	2	Ret	3	2	61
7	(United Kingdom) Elfyn Evans	9	9	13	8	11	13	55
8	(United Kingdom) Adam Gould	3	10	6	Ret	4		53
9	(Republic of Ireland) Craig Breen	Ret	3	Ret			9	52.5
10	(Republic of Ireland) Robert Barrable	15	12	9	10	Ret	12	44.5
11	(United Kingdom) Dave Weston, Jr.	2	Ret	8	6	Ret		42
12=	(Finland) Jarkko Nikara	13	7	14	5	Ret		38
12=	(United Kingdom) Mark Donnelly	11	17	11	12	13		38
12=	(United Kingdom) Alan Cookson	Ret	8	10	Ret		7	38
15	(United Kingdom) Euan Thorburn	4	14	DNS	9			30
16	(Finland) Matti Rantanen	Ret	Ret	12	7	15		29
17	(Finland) Mikko Pajunen	17	11	19	Ret	Ret	10	27
18	(United Kingdom) John MacCrone	24	Ret	23	13	16	17	25.5
19	(Republic of Ireland) Daniel McKenna						4	22.5
20	(Australia) Molly Taylor	18	19	17	14	Ret	14	21.5
21	(United Kingdom) Max Utting	14	15	16	16		8	17
22=	(Republic of Ireland) Owen Murphy	Ret	5	Ret				14
22=	(United Kingdom) Steve Graham	25	21	21	20	26	20	14
24=	(United Kingdom) Darren Gass	6						13
24=	(United Kingdom) Tom Clark			20	Ret	27	18	13
26	(United Kingdom) John Boyd	21	Ret	18			15	11
27=	(United Kingdom) David Bogie	12	Ret					8
27=	(Republic of Ireland) Joe McGonigle	19	16	15	Ret	Ret		8
29	(United Kingdom) Luke Pinder	20	13	Ret				7
30	(United Kingdom) Peter Taylor	Ret	18	Ret	15			6
31	(United Kingdom) Mark Gamble						19	4.5
32=	(United Kingdom) David Harrison	23	Ret		18			4
32=	(Kenya) Peter Horsey	16						4
34	(United Kingdom) Spencer Wilkinson	22	Ret					1
Pos	Driver	BUL	PIR	JCR	IOM	ULS	YOR	Pts

Key
Colour	Result
Gold	Winner
Silver	2nd place
Bronze	3rd place
Green	Non-podium finish
Purple	Did not finish (Ret)
Black	Disqualified (DSQ)
Black	Excluded (EXC)
White	Did not start (DNS)
*	Joker played
