= 2009 Rally Isle of Man =

2009 Rally Isle of Man 46th Rally Isle of Man
Round 4 of the 2009 British Rally Championship
← Previous event	Next event →
- Host country: Isle of Man
- Rally base: Douglas, Isle of Man
- Dates run: July 10 – 11 2009
- Stages: 20 (302.43 km; 187.92 miles)
- Stage surface: Tarmac

Statistics
- Crews: 42 at start, 26 at finish

Overall results
- Overall winner: (United Kingdom) Mark Higgins (United Kingdom) Pirelli TEG Sport

2009 Rally Isle of Man was held on July 9–11, 2009, the 46th Rally Isle of Man and was round 4 of the 2009 MSA British Rally Championship, round 6 of the 2009 Irish Tarmac Rally Championship and round 5 of the 2009 MSA British Historic Rally Championship.

A fifth win in the International section of the 2009 Rally Isle of Man, Mark Higgins became the most successive driver in the event with co-driver Bryan Thomas in a Subaru Impreza N11. In second place was close title rivals in the BRC Championship with Keith Cronin/Greg Shinnors from the pairing of Alastair Fisher/Rory Kennedy in third place both driving Mitsubishi Evo 9 cars. The 2009 Historic Rally provided a seventh overall win for Dessie Nutt with co-driver Geraldine McBride with a Porsche 911. The Post-Historic class was won by Steve Smith/John Nichols also driving a Porsche 911 and Classic section won by Gwyndaf Evans/John Nichols with a Ford Escort. The first leg of the Isle of Man Rally Challenge was won by Matt Edward/Rob Fagg and the second leg by Ross Ford/Gary McElhinney both driving Ford Fiesta ST cars. The 2009 Manx Trophy Rally provided the third win for local Isle of Man crew of George Collister/Janet Craine driving a Mitsubishi Evo 3 rally car.

== Special stages ==
Day	Stage	Time	Name	Length	Winner	Time	Avg. spd.	Rally leader
1 (10 July)	SS1	10:28	Staarvey 1	7.22 miles	(United Kingdom) Mark Higgins	6' 12.0	68.97 mph	(United Kingdom) Mark Higgins
1 (10 July)	SS2	11:06	Kella 1	11.21 miles	(Republic of Ireland) Keith Cronin	9' 50.7	68.32 mph	(Republic of Ireland) Keith Cronin
1 (10 July)	SS3	11:39	Ravensdale	7.14 miles	(Republic of Ireland) Keith Cronin	6' 10.0	69.97 mph	(Republic of Ireland) Keith Cronin
1 (10 July)	SS4	13:23	Newtown 1	21.28 miles	(United Kingdom) Mark Higgins	17' 23.4	73.42 mph	(United Kingdom) Mark Higgins
1 (10 July)	SS5	14:08	Cringle 1	13.66 miles	(United Kingdom) Mark Higgins	11' 23.4	71.89 mph	(United Kingdom) Mark Higgins
1 (10 July)	SS6	15:58	Glen Roy 1	4.66 miles	(United Kingdom) Mark Higgins	4' 29.3	62.30 mph	(United Kingdom) Mark Higgins
1 (10 July)	SS7	16:48	Maughold 1	3.30 miles	(United Kingdom) Mark Higgins	3' 07.8	63.25 mph	(United Kingdom) Mark Higgins
1 (10 July)	SS8	16:51	Dog Mills	12.47 miles	(Republic of Ireland) Keith Cronin	10' 08.8	73.74 mph	(United Kingdom) Mark Higgins
1 (10 July)	SS9	18:48	Marine	5.07 miles	(United Kingdom) Mark Higgins	4' 34.7	66.45 mph	(United Kingdom) Mark Higgins
1 (10 July)	SS10	19:13	Castletown 1	1.26 miles	(United Kingdom) Mark Higgins	1' 25.5	53.11 mph	(United Kingdom) Mark Higgins
1 (10 July)	SS11	19:30	Castletown 2	1.26 miles	(Republic of Ireland) Keith Cronin	1' 24.4	53.80 mph	(United Kingdom) Mark Higgins
1 (10 July)	SS12	20:03	West Baldwin	11.65 miles	(United Kingdom) Mark Higgins	9' 41.3	72.15 mph	(United Kingdom) Mark Higgins
2 (11 July)	SS13	09:33	Glen Roy 2	4.66 miles	(Republic of Ireland) Keith Cronin	4' 41.6	59.58 mph	(United Kingdom) Mark Higgins
2 (11 July)	SS14	10:01	Maughold 2	3.30 miles	(Republic of Ireland) Keith Cronin	3' 04.3	64.45 mph	(United Kingdom) Mark Higgins
2 (11 July)	SS15	10:26	Glascoe	5.83 miles	(Republic of Ireland) Keith Cronin	4' 42.7	74.22 mph	(United Kingdom) Mark Higgins
2 (11 July)	SS16	10:47	Kella 2	11.21 miles	(Republic of Ireland) Keith Cronin	9' 45.7	68.90 mph	(United Kingdom) Mark Higgins
2 (11 July)	SS17	12:33	Newtown 2	21.38 miles	(United Kingdom) Mark Higgins	17' 03.8	75.15 mph	(United Kingdom) Mark Higgins
2 (11 July)	SS18	13:18	Cringle 2	13.66 miles	(United Kingdom) Mark Higgins	12' 17.0	66.71 mph	(United Kingdom) Mark Higgins
2 (11 July)	SS19	15:03	Staarvey 2	7.22 miles	(Republic of Ireland) Keith Cronin	6' 12.6	69.76 mph	(United Kingdom) Mark Higgins
2 (11 July)	SS20	15:41	Classic	13.27 miles	(Republic of Ireland) Keith Cronin	12' 19.4	64.62 mph	(United Kingdom) Mark Higgins

== Results ==
Pos.	Driver	Co-driver	Car	Time	Difference	Points
Isle of Man International Rally(BRC)
1.	(United Kingdom) Mark Higgins	(United Kingdom) Bryan Thomas	Subaru Impreza N11	2:37.47.2	0.0	20
2.	(Republic of Ireland) Keith Cronin	(Republic of Ireland) Greg Shinnors	Mitsubishi Evo 9	2:39.13.6	1' 26.4	18
3.	(United Kingdom) Alistair Fisher	(Republic of Ireland) Rory Kennedy	Mitsubishi Evo 9	2:44.12.5	6' 25.3	16
4.	(United Kingdom) Steven Quine	(United Kingdom) Paul McCann	Mitsubishi Evo 6	2:47.44.0	9' 56.8	15
5.	(United Kingdom) Euan Thorburn	(United Kingdom) Cambell Roy	Subaru Impreza N11	2:48.18.9	10' 31.7	14
6.	(United Kingdom) Dave Weston Jnr	(United Kingdom) Aled Davis	Subaru Impreza N11	2:52.10.0	14' 22.8	13
7.	(United Kingdom) Martin McCormack	(United Kingdom) Phil Clarke	Subaru Impreza N11	2:53.07.4	15' 30.2	12
8.	(United Kingdom) Jason Pritchard	(United Kingdom) Andrew Edwards	Citroën C2 R2 Max	2:54.15.4	16' 28.2	10
9.	(United Kingdom) Tom Walster	(United Kingdom) Craig Parry	Renault Clio R3	2:54.30.5	16' 43.3	9
10.	(United Kingdom) Andrew Leece	(United Kingdom) Richard Skinner	Ford Fiesta ST	2:57.47.8	20' 00.6	8
Isle of Man Historic Rally – Category 1 Cars (registered before 31/12/67)
1.	(United Kingdom) Dessie Nutt	(United Kingdom) Geraldine McBride	Porsche 911 B5	2:58.14.0	0.0	15.5
2.	(United Kingdom) Gary Edington	(United Kingdom) Jane Edington	Singer Chamois	3:04.27.8	6' 13.8	15
3.	(United Kingdom) Stephen Higgins	(United Kingdom) David Corlett	Mini Cooper S	3:14.22.8	16' 08.8	–
4.	(Japan) Shinobu Kitani	(Japan) Makoto Mizoi	Austin Mini Cooper S	3:20.34.8	22' 20.8	–
5.	(United Kingdom) John Moxon	(United Kingdom) Stephen Moxon	Volvo Amazon 122 S	3:21.40.9	23' 26.9	14
6.	(United Kingdom) Alan Honess	(United Kingdom) Tim Sayer	Ford Cortina Mk 1	3:32.08.8	33' 54.8	–
7.	(United Kingdom) Matt Pearce	(United Kingdom) Derek Pearce	Mini Cooper S	4:15.09.6	1:16.55.6	–
8.	(United Kingdom) Philip Smith	(United Kingdom) Barbara Smith	Porsche 911	4:45.41.7	1:47.27.2	12.5
Isle of Man Historic Rally – Category 2 Cars (registered between 1/1/68 and 31/12/74)
1.	(United Kingdom) Steve Smith	(United Kingdom) John Nichols	Porsche 911	2:41.16.6	0.0	15.5
2.	(United Kingdom) David Stokes	(United Kingdom) Guy Weaver	Ford Escort RS 1600	2:42.28.0	1' 11.4	15
3.	(United Kingdom) Ernie Graham	(United Kingdom) Ashley Trimble	Ford Escort RS 1600	2:44.15.7	2' 59.1	12.5
4.	(United Kingdom) Derek Boyd	(United Kingdom) Roisin Boyd	Porsche 911	2:44.40.7	3' 24.1	11.5
5.	(United Kingdom) Rupert Lomax	(United Kingdom) David Alcock	Ford Escort Mk 1	2:44.56.7	3' 40.1	11
6.	(United Kingdom) Drew Wylie	(United Kingdom) Ken Forster	Ford Escort RS 2000	2:47.20.1	6' 03.5	13
7.	(United Kingdom) Ken Forster	(United Kingdom) John Stager-Leathers	Ford Escort Mk 1 RS 2000	2:49.08.7	7' 52.1	10
8.	(United Kingdom) Peter Smith	(United Kingdom) Graham Wild	Porsche 911	2:49.14.6	7' 58.0	9.5
9.	(France) Peter Lythell	(United Kingdom) Gill Cotton	Porsche 911	2:51.03.5	9' 46.9	7.5
10.	(United Kingdom) Andrew Siddall	(United Kingdom) Colin Thompson	Ford Escort	2:51.53.0	9' 46.9	8
Isle of Man Historic Rally – Category 3 Cars (registered between 1/1/75 to 31/12/81)
1.	(United Kingdom) Gwyndaf Evans	(United Kingdom) John Nichols	Ford Escort	2:32.59.3	0.0	15.5
2.	(United Kingdom) Phil Collins	(Republic of Ireland) Diarmuid Farley	Opel Ascona	2:38.14.1	5' 14.8	–
3.	(United Kingdom) Mark Solloway	(United Kingdom) Den Golding	Ford Escort RS 1800	2:40.38.3	7' 39.0	–
4.	(United Kingdom) Darren Moon	(United Kingdom) Chris Parson	Ford Escort Mk II	2:43.26.1	10' 26.8	12.5
5.	(United Kingdom) Ian Corkill	(United Kingdom) Rivka Corkill	Ford Escort Mk II RS 1800	2:44.46.5	11' 47.2	–
6.	(United Kingdom) Guy Woodcock	(United Kingdom) Iwan Jones	Ford Escort	2:45.32.3	12' 33.0	–
7.	(United Kingdom) William Onions	(United Kingdom) Tim Hobbs	Ford Escort Mk 1 RS 1800	2:49.05.0	16' 01.2	9.5
8.	(United Kingdom) Roger Kilty	(United Kingdom) Lynette Banks	Vauxhall Chevette HSR	2:51.12.6	18' 13.3	11
9.	(United Kingdom) Chris Shooter	(United Kingdom) Bev LeGood	Ford Escort	2:56.47.8	23' 48.5	–
10.	(United Kingdom) Adrian Young	(United Kingdom) Keith Fellows	Ford Escort RS 2000	2:59.35.1	26' 35.8	–
Isle of Man Challenge 1 Rally
1.	(United Kingdom) Matt Edwards	(United Kingdom) Rob Fagg	Ford Fiesta ST	1:21.59.4	0.0	31
2.	(Republic of Ireland) Ross Forde	(Republic of Ireland) Gary McElhinney	Ford Fiesta ST	1:22.01.1	0' 01.7	–
3.	(United Kingdom) Neil Matthews	(United Kingdom) John Connor	Vauxhall Nova	1:25.08.7	3' 07.6	29
4.	(United Kingdom) Brett Griffin	(United Kingdom) Sam Fordham	Peugeot 205 GTI 1.9	1:33.43.7	8' 35.0	27
Isle of Man Challenge 2 Rally
1.	(Republic of Ireland) Ross Forde	(Republic of Ireland) Gary McElhinney	Ford Fiesta ST	1:17.30.9	0.0	–
2.	(United Kingdom) Matt Edwards	(United Kingdom) Rob Fagg	Ford Fiesta ST	1:17.36.8	0' 05.9	31
3.	(United Kingdom) Neil Matthews	(United Kingdom) John Connor	Vauxhall Nova	1:22.08.4	4' 37.5	29
4.	(United Kingdom) David Radcliffe	(United Kingdom) Steve Hartley	Suzuki Swift GTI	1:23.06.09	5' 36.0	25
5.	(United Kingdom) Austin McKinlay	(United Kingdom) Anthony Palmer	Peugeot 106 GTI	1:23.10.2	5' 36.9	24
6.	(United Kingdom) Brett Griffin	(United Kingdom) Sam Fordham	Peugeot 205 GTI 1.9	1:23.20.9	5' 50.0	25
7.	(United Kingdom) James Watts	(United Kingdom) Janice Moore	Volkswagen Polo	1:25.30.1	7' 59.2	20
Isle of Man Trophy Rally
1.	(United Kingdom) George Collister	(United Kingdom) Janet Craine	Mitsubishi Evo 3	55' 31.0	0.0	–
2.	(United Kingdom) Lee Batty	(United Kingdom) David Batty	Ford Escort Mk II	56' 27.6	0' 56.6	–
3.	(United Kingdom) James Hoseason	(United Kingdom) Maurice Jellie	Darrian T90 GT	57' 28.8	1' 57.8	–
4.	(United Kingdom) David Corris	(United Kingdom) Paul Bumfrey	Ford Cosworth WRC	59' 05.3	3' 34.3	–
5.	(United Kingdom) James Quirk	(United Kingdom) Edwin Kennaugh	Vauxhall Corsa	1:00.18.7	4' 47.7	–
6.	(United Kingdom) Mark Straker	(United Kingdom) Neil Harrison	Darrian T9	1:00.42.2	5' 11.2	–
7.	(United Kingdom) Glenn Leece	(United Kingdom) John Tarrant	Subaru Impreza N11	1:00.45.3	5' 14.3	–
8.	(United Kingdom) Kevin Vondy	(United Kingdom) Nicholas Kaighin	Vauxhall Corsa	1:00.46.6	5' 15.6	–
9.	(United Kingdom) David Craine	(United Kingdom) Janet Leece	Ford Escort Cosworth	1:02.06.1	6' 35.1	–
10.	(United Kingdom) Guy Simpkiss	(United Kingdom) Debbie Parry	Vauxhall Astra	1:02.06.1	7' 16.3	–

== Retirements ==
International

- (United Kingdom) Jonathan Greer/Kirsty Riddick (Mitusbishi Evo 9) – Rolled (SS8);
- (Australia) Molly Taylor/Jemma Bellingham (Suzuki Swift Sport) – Rolled (SS13);
- (United Kingdom) Adam Gould/Sebastian Marshall (Subaru Impreza) – Rolled (SS17);
- (Finland) Matti Rantanen/Mikko Lukka (Renault Clio Ragnotti) – Accident (SS18);

== 2009 British Rally Championship Drivers' championship ==
Pos	Driver	IRNW (United Kingdom)	PIR (United Kingdom)	JCIR (United Kingdom)	RIOM (United Kingdom)	UIR (United Kingdom)	IROY (United Kingdom)	Pts
1	(Republic of Ireland) Keith Cronin	1	1	7	2			76
2	(United Kingdom) Mark Higgins	2	2	6	1			76
3	(United Kingdom) Alastair Fisher	7	4	10	3			57
4	(United Kingdom) Dave Weston Jnr	6	6	Ret	6			40
5	(United Kingdom) Jonathan Greer	8	5	11	Ret			38
6	(United Kingdom) Martin McCormack	14	11	15	7			38
7	(United Kingdom) David Bogie	5	3	Ret	20			33
8	(United Kingdom) Adam Gould	4	Ret	8	Ret			31
9	(United Kingdom) Tom Walster	9	21	16	9			31
10	(United Kingdom) Euan Thorburn	Ret	Ret	9	5			30
11	(United Kingdom) Jason Pritchard	11	30	17	8			29
12	(United Kingdom) Chris Firth	13	8	23	Ret			22
13	(Republic of Ireland) Craig Breen	10	10	Ret	Ret			19
14	(United Kingdom) Stuart Jones	3						16
15	(Iceland) Daniel Siguardason		7					12
16	(United Kingdom) Geoff Jones			12				12
17	(United Kingdom) Luke Pinder	25	Ret	25	12			12
18	(Finland) Matti Rantanen	Ret	Ret	13	Ret			11
19	(United Kingdom) Mark Gamble	21	18	18	Ret			11
20	(United Kingdom) Kris Hall	Ret	Ret	Ret	11			10
21	(United Kingdom) Kyle Orr	17	13	Ret				10
22	(United Kingdom) Gordon Nichol	28	23	24	17			10
Pos	Driver	IRNW (Wales)	PIR (England)	JCIR (Scotland)	RIOM (Isle of Man)	UIR (Northern Ireland)	IROY (England)	Pts

Key
Colour	Result
Gold	Winner
Silver	2nd place
Bronze	3rd place
Green	Points finish
Blue	Non-points finish
Blue	Non-classified finish (NC)
Purple	Did not finish (Ret)
Black	Excluded (EX)
Black	Disqualified (DSQ)
White	Did not start (DNS)
White	Cancelled (C)
Blank	Withdrew entry from the event (WD)
