= 2011 British Rally Championship =

Seasons
- ← 2010 2012 →

The 2011 Dulux Trade MSA British Rally Championship was the 53rd season of the British Rally Championship. The addition of the Rally Sunseeker International to the calendar was due to bring the number of events to seven. The season begins on 26 February in Bournemouth and ends on 24 September in Yorkshire. Dulux Trade is once again the sponsor of the series, which is part of a two-year deal agreed in February 2010.

== Season summary ==
In September, following the International Rally Yorkshire, David Bogie and co-driver Kevin Rae were declared champions having won three out of the six events and scoring 110 points. Runners up with 100 points were Elfyn Evans and co-driver Andrew Edwards. The final podium position was taken by Jonny Greer and Dai Roberts with 95 points.

== Calendar ==
The 2011 calendar originally consisted of seven rounds, one more event than in 2010. However, the final round of the championship, Rally Isle of Man, was cancelled in September 2011.

Round	Dates	Location	Rally HQ	Surface	Winner
1	26 February	Rallye Sunseeker International	Bournemouth	Gravel	(United Kingdom) David Bogie
2	2 April	Bulldog International Rally North Wales	Welshpool	Gravel	(United Kingdom) Elfyn Evans
3	30 April	Pirelli International Rally	Carlisle	Gravel	(United Kingdom) David Bogie
4	27–28 May	Jim Clark International Rally	Kelso	Asphalt	(United Kingdom) David Bogie
5	19–20 August	International Rally Northern Ireland	Antrim	Asphalt	(United Kingdom) Martin McCormack
6	23–24 September	International Rally Yorkshire	Scarborough	Gravel	(United Kingdom) Elfyn Evans

== Drivers championship standings ==
Pos	Driver	SUN	BUL	PIR	JCR	ULS	YOR	Pts
1	(United Kingdom) David Bogie	1	2	1	1	4	3	110
2	(United Kingdom) Elfyn Evans	3	1	4	4	6	1	100
3	(United Kingdom) Jonathan Greer	6	4	3	2	5	2	95
4	(United Kingdom) Martin McCormack		8	5	5	2	4	74
5	(Finland) Mikko Pajunen	11	12	Ret	9	12	7	49
6	(United Kingdom) Adam Gould	4	3	Ret	3			47
7	(Estonia) Siim Plangi	10	11	11	Ret	15	8	45
8	(United Kingdom) Tom Clark	8	6	10	13			40
9	(United Kingdom) Callum Black	12	10	Ret	12	Ret	6	37
10	(United Kingdom) Mark Donnelly	Ret	7	8	Ret	8		36
11	(United Kingdom) Peter Taylor		Ret	12	7	Ret	5	33
12	(United Kingdom) Osain Pryce	20	15	15	15	18	12	31
13	(Republic of Ireland) Robert Barrable	7		2	Ret			30
14	(Republic of Ireland) Craig Breen	14	9	7	Ret			28
14	(Republic of Ireland) Joe McGonigle				11	13	11	28
16	(Finland) Jussi Kumpumaki		13	21	14	9	Ret	25
17	(United Kingdom) Jason Pritchard	Ret	5	9	Ret			24
18	(Republic of Ireland) Desi Henry	Ret	Ret	17	10	Ret	10	22
19	(United Kingdom) Kit Leigh		Ret	16	17	22	13	20
20	(United Kingdom) Tom Cave	2	Ret	Ret	Ret			18
20	(Republic of Ireland) Tommy Doyle					3		18
20	(United Kingdom) Nick Cristofaro	15	16	14	16		Ret	18
23	(Republic of Ireland) Daniel Barry	5	Ret	Ret				14
24	(Finland) Jukka Korhonen			6				13
24	(United Kingdom) Alastair Fisher				6			13
26	(United Kingdom) Louise Cook	18	18	19	19		15	12
27	(United Kingdom) Alan Carmichael	9			Ret	Ret		10
28	(United Kingdom) Alex Laffey	19	Ret	18	20	Ret	14	9
29	(Republic of Ireland) Daniel O'Brien	16	17	20	Ret			8
30	(Australia) Molly Taylor	Ret	Ret	13				6
31	(United Kingdom) John Boyd	17	Ret	Ret				3
Not registered for BRC points
	(United Kingdom) Garry Jennings					1		0
	(Republic of Ireland) Sam Moffett					7		0
	(United Kingdom) David Mann				8			0
	(France) Vincent Dubert						9	0
	(Republic of Ireland) Kieran Daly					10		0
	(Republic of Ireland) Scott McElhinney					11		0
	(Barbados) Neil Armstrong	13						0
	(United Kingdom) Wug Utting		14					0
	(United Kingdom) Willie Mavitty					14		0
	(Republic of Ireland) David Carney					16		0
	(United Kingdom) Jeremy Taylor					17		0
	(United Kingdom) Steve Wood				18			0
	(Republic of Ireland) Liam Egan					19		0
	(Republic of Ireland) Peter O'Kane					20		0
	(United Kingdom) Joe Shrimpton					21		0
	(United Kingdom) Barry Greer					23		0
Pos	Driver	SUN	BUL	PIR	JCR	ULS	YOR	Pts

Key
Colour	Result
Gold	Winner
Silver	2nd place
Bronze	3rd place
Green	Non-podium finish
Purple	Did not finish (Ret)
Black	Disqualified (DSQ)
Black	Excluded (EXC)
White	Did not start (DNS)
*	Joker played

Points are awarded to the highest placed registered driver on each event as follows: 20, 18, 16, 15, and so on deleting one point per placing down to one single point for all finishers.
