= 2012 British Rally Championship =

Seasons
- ← 2011 2013 →

The 2012 MSA British Rally Championship was the 54th season of the British Rally Championship. The season began on 24 February in Bournemouth and ended on 29 September in Yorkshire.

== Season summary ==
The 2012 season will start without a defending champion as last years winner David Bogie announced in February that he will not contest the BRC series this year. Instead he intends to concentrate on the Scottish Rally Championship.

== Calendar ==
The 2012 calendar consists of six rounds.

Round	Dates	Location	Rally HQ	Surface	Winner
1	24/25 February	Rallye Sunseeker International	Bournemouth	Gravel	(United Kingdom) Mark Donnelly
2	23/24 March	Bulldog International Rally North Wales	Welshpool	Gravel	(United Kingdom) Tom Cave
3	27/28 April	Pirelli International Rally	Carlisle	Gravel	(Republic of Ireland) Keith Cronin
4	1/3 June	Jim Clark International Rally	Kelso	Asphalt	(Republic of Ireland) Keith Cronin
5	17/18 August	International Rally Northern Ireland	Antrim	Asphalt	(Republic of Ireland) Keith Cronin
6	28/29 September	International Rally Yorkshire	Scarborough	Gravel	(United Kingdom) Tom Cave

== Drivers championship standings ==
Top 10 positions

Pos	Driver	SUN	BUL	PIR	JCR	ULS	YOR	Pts
1	(Republic of Ireland) Keith Cronin	Ret	2	1	1	1	3	102
2	(United Kingdom) Tom Cave	12	1	9	2	6	1	94
3	(United Kingdom) Osian Pryce	4	4	Ret	5	3	2	87
4	(United Kingdom) Elfyn Evans	3	5	4	4	2		78
5	(United Kingdom) Jonathan Greer		6	10	3	4	12	65
6	(United Kingdom) Matthew Cathcart	8	13	Ret	8	7	7	61
7	(Republic of Ireland) Desi Henry	2	8	16	15	Ret	4	59.5
8	(Finland) Jukka Korhonen	Ret	7	6	7	Ret	5	58
9	(United Kingdom) Mark Donnelly	1	Ret	3	6	Ret		49
10	(United Kingdom) Callum Black	Ret			9	8	6	41.5
Pos	Driver	SUN	BUL	PIR	JCR	ULS	YOR	Pts

Key
Colour	Result
Gold	Winner
Silver	2nd place
Bronze	3rd place
Green	Non-podium finish
Purple	Did not finish (Ret)
Black	Disqualified (DSQ)
Black	Excluded (EXC)
White	Did not start (DNS)
*	Joker played

Points are awarded to the highest placed registered driver on each event as follows: 20, 18, 16, 15, and so on deleting one point per placing down to one single point for all finishers.
