= 2004 Swedish Rally =

Rallying motorsport event

2004 Swedish Rally 53rd Uddeholm Swedish Rally
Round 2 of the 2004 World Rally Championship season
← Previous event	Next event →
- Host country: Sweden
- Rally base: Hagfors
- Dates run: February 6, 2004 – February 8, 2004
- Stages: 19 (394.80 km; 245.32 miles)
- Stage surface: Snow
- Overall distance: 1,981.68 km (1,231.36 miles)

Statistics
- Crews: 70 at start, 49 at finish

Overall results
- Overall winner: (France) Sébastien Loeb (Monaco) Daniel Elena (France) Citroën Total; Citroën Xsara WRC

The 2004 Swedish Rally (formally the 53rd Uddeholm Swedish Rally) was the second round of the 2004 World Rally Championship. The race was held over three days between 6 February and 8 February 2004, and was based in Hagfors, Sweden. Citroën's Sébastien Loeb won the race, his 6th win in the World Rally Championship.

== Background ==
=== Entry list ===
No.	Driver	Co-Driver	Entrant	Car	Tyre
World Rally Championship manufacturer entries
1	(Norway) Petter Solberg	(United Kingdom) Phil Mills	(Japan) 555 Subaru World Rally Team	Subaru Impreza S9 WRC '03	P
2	(Finland) Mikko Hirvonen	(Finland) Jarmo Lehtinen	(Japan) 555 Subaru World Rally Team	Subaru Impreza S9 WRC '03	P
3	(France) Sébastien Loeb	(Monaco) Daniel Elena	(France) Citroën Total WRT	Citroën Xsara WRC	M
4	(Spain) Carlos Sainz	(Spain) Marc Martí	(France) Citroën Total WRT	Citroën Xsara WRC	M
5	(Finland) Marcus Grönholm	(Finland) Timo Rautiainen	(France) Marlboro Peugeot Total	Peugeot 307 WRC	M
6	(Belgium) Freddy Loix	(Belgium) Sven Smeets	(France) Marlboro Peugeot Total	Peugeot 307 WRC	M
7	(Estonia) Markko Märtin	(United Kingdom) Michael Park	(United Kingdom) Ford Motor Co. Ltd.	Ford Focus RS WRC '03	M
8	(Finland) Janne Tuohino	(Finland) Jukka Aho	(United Kingdom) Ford Motor Co. Ltd.	Ford Focus RS WRC '03	M
9	(France) Gilles Panizzi	(France) Hervé Panizzi	(Japan) Mitsubishi Motors	Mitsubishi Lancer WRC 04	M
10	(Finland) Kristian Sohlberg	(Finland) Kaj Lindström	(Japan) Mitsubishi Motors	Mitsubishi Lancer WRC 04	M
World Rally Championship entries
11	(Belgium) François Duval	(Belgium) Stéphane Prévot	(United Kingdom) Ford Motor Co. Ltd.	Ford Focus RS WRC '03	M
12	(Norway) Henning Solberg	(Norway) Cato Menkerud	(France) Bozian Racing	Peugeot 206 WRC	M
14	(Sweden) Daniel Carlsson	(Sweden) Matthias Andersson	(France) Bozian Racing	Peugeot 206 WRC	M
15	(Sweden) Tobias Johansson	(Sweden) Bosse Holmstrand	(Sweden) Rally Team Olsbergs	Ford Focus RS WRC '02	M
16	(Sweden) Andreas Eriksson	(Sweden) Pecka Svensson	(Sweden) Andreas Eriksson	Ford Focus RS WRC '02	P
17	(Finland) Jari Viita	(Finland) Timo Hantunen	(United Kingdom) M-Sport	Ford Focus RS WRC '03	M
18	(Germany) Antony Warmbold	(United Kingdom) Gemma Price	(United Kingdom) M-Sport	Ford Focus RS WRC '02	M
61	(Norway) Kristian Kolberg	(Norway) Ola Fløene	(Norway) Kristian Kolberg	Hyundai Accent WRC2	C
62	(Norway) Thomas Schie	(Norway) Ragnar Engen	(Norway) Thomas Schie	Toyota Corolla WRC	M
63	(Norway) Thomas Kolberg	(Norway) Ole Kristian Unnerud	(Norway) Thomas Kolberg	Hyundai Accent WRC2	C
75	(Hungary) Balázs Benik	(Hungary) Zoltan Doromby	(Hungary) Balázs Benik	Ford Focus RS WRC '02	M
77	(Slovakia) Jozef Béreš Jr.	(Czech Republic) Petr Starý	(Slovakia) Jozef Béreš Jr.	Hyundai Accent WRC3	M
78	(United Kingdom) Andrew Nesbitt	(Republic of Ireland) James O'Brien	(United Kingdom) Andrew Nesbitt	Subaru Impreza S7 WRC '01	P
81	(Sweden) Mikael Ericsson	(Sweden) Dorothe Larsson	(Sweden) Mikael Ericsson	Mitsubishi Lancer VI	—N/a
PWRC entries
31	(Japan) Toshihiro Arai	(New Zealand) Tony Sircombe	(Japan) Subaru Team Arai	Subaru Impreza WRX STI	P
32	(Malaysia) Karamjit Singh	(Malaysia) Allen Oh	Proton Pert Malaysia	Proton Pert	P
33	(Spain) Daniel Solà	(Spain) Xavier Amigò	Ralliart Italy	Mitsubishi Lancer Evo VII	—N/a
35	(Argentina) Marcos Ligato	(Argentina) Rubén García	(Italy) Top Run SRL	Subaru Impreza WRX STI	—N/a
36	(Mexico) Ricardo Triviño	(Spain) Jordi Barrabés	(Mexico) Triviño Racing	Mitsubishi Lancer Evo VII	—N/a
37	(Sweden) Joakim Roman	(Sweden) Ragnar Spjuth	(Sweden) Milbrooks World Rally Team	Subaru Impreza WRX STI	M
38	(Bulgaria) Georgi Geradzhiev Jr.	(Bulgaria) Nikola Popov	(Bulgaria) Racing Team Bulgartabac	Mitsubishi Lancer Evo VII	—N/a
39	(United Kingdom) Alister McRae	(United Kingdom) David Senior	(United Kingdom) R.E.D World Rally Team	Subaru Impreza WRX STI	P
40	(Austria) Manfred Stohl	(Austria) Ilka Minor	(Austria) OMV World Rally Team	Mitsubishi Lancer Evo VII	P
41	(Finland) Jani Paasonen	(Finland) Sirkka Rautiainen	(Austria) OMV World Rally Team	Mitsubishi Lancer Evo VII	P
42	(United Kingdom) Mark Higgins	(United Kingdom) Michael Gibson	(Italy) Top Run SRL	Subaru Impreza STI	—N/a
43	(Italy) Gianluigi Galli	(Italy) Guido D'Amore	Ralliart Italy	Mitsubishi Lancer Evo VII	P
44	(Qatar) Nasser Al-Attiyah	(United Kingdom) Steve Lancaster	(United Kingdom) Autotek Motorsport	Subaru Impreza STI	—N/a
45	(Italy) Fabio Frisiero	(Italy) Giovanni Agnese	(Italy) Top Run SRL	Subaru Impreza WRX STI	—N/a
46	(Poland) Tomasz Kuchar	(Poland) Maciej Wodniak	Kuchar Team Poland	Mitsubishi Lancer Evo VII	M
47	(Spain) Xavier Pons	(Spain) Oriol Julià	Ralliart Spain	Mitsubishi Lancer Evo VII	M
49	(Spain) Sergio López-Fombona	(Spain) Guifré Pujol	Ralliart Spain	Mitsubishi Lancer Evo VII	—N/a
50	(Germany) Sebastian Vollak	(Germany) Michael Kölbach	(Austria) OMV World Rally Team	Mitsubishi Lancer Evo VI	P

=== Itinerary ===
All dates and times are CET (UTC+1).

Date	Time	No.	Stage name	Distance
Leg 1 — 145.80 km
6 February	08:22	SS1	Lidsbron	19.59 km
6 February	09:34	SS2	Torntorp	19.21 km
6 February	11:37	SS3	Granberget 1	52.57 km
6 February	15:05	SS4	Granberget 2	52.57 km
6 February	17:04	SS5	Hagfors Sprint 1	1.86 km
Leg 2 — 152.40 km
7 February	07:46	SS6	Sundsjon 1	20.78 km
7 February	08:22	SS7	Malta 1	11.25 km
7 February	10:18	SS8	Fredriksberg	20.13 km
7 February	11:05	SS9	Lejen	26.40 km
7 February	13:32	SS10	Malta 2	11.25 km
7 February	14:27	SS11	Sundsjon 1	20.78 km
7 February	15:46	SS12	Vargåsen	39.95 km
7 February	17:11	SS13	Hagfors Sprint 2	1.86 km
Leg 3 — 96.60 km
8 February	08:04	SS14	Sågen 1	14.17 km
8 February	08:54	SS15	Rämmen 1	23.35 km
8 February	10:06	SS16	Hara 1	10.78 km
8 February	12:18	SS17	Sågen 2	14.17 km
8 February	13:08	SS18	Rämmen 2	23.35 km
8 February	14:20	SS19	Hara 2	10.78 km

== Results ==
=== Overall ===
Pos.	No.	Driver	Co-driver	Team	Car	Time	Difference	Points
1	3	(France) Sébastien Loeb	(Monaco) Daniel Elena	(France) Citroën Total	Citroën Xsara WRC	3:26:17.7		10
2	5	(Finland) Marcus Grönholm	(Finland) Timo Rautiainen	(France) Marlboro Peugeot Total	Peugeot 307 WRC	3:27:04.1	+46.4	8
3	1	(Norway) Petter Solberg	(United Kingdom) Phil Mills	(Japan) 555 Subaru World Rally Team	Subaru Impreza S9 WRC '03	3:27:39.2	+1:21.5	6
4	8	(Finland) Janne Tuohino	(Finland) Jukka Aho	(United Kingdom) Ford Motor Co. Ltd.	Ford Focus RS WRC '03	3:27:59.8	+1:42.1	5
5	4	(Spain) Carlos Sainz	(Spain) Marc Martí	(France) Citroën Total WRT	Citroën Xsara WRC	3:28:44.7	+2:27.0	4
6	12	(Norway) Henning Solberg	(Norway) Cato Menkerud	(France) Bozian Racing	Peugeot 206 WRC	3:30:35.3	+4:17.6	3
7	7	(Estonia) Markko Märtin	(United Kingdom) Michael Park	(United Kingdom) Ford Motor Co Ltd	Ford Focus RS WRC '03	3:31:56.0	+5:38.3	2
8	14	(Sweden) Daniel Carlsson	(Sweden) Matthias Andersson	(France) Bozian Racing	Peugeot 206 WRC	3:32:08.1	+5:50.4	1

=== World Rally Cars ===
==== Classification ====
Position		No.	Driver	Co-driver	Entrant	Car	Time	Difference	Points
Event	Class	No.	Driver	Co-driver	Entrant	Car	Time	Difference	Points
1	1	3	(France) Sébastien Loeb	(Monaco) Daniel Elena	(France) Citroën Total	Citroën Xsara WRC	3:26:17.7		10
2	2	5	(Finland) Marcus Grönholm	(Finland) Timo Rautiainen	(France) Marlboro Peugeot Total	Peugeot 307 WRC	3:27:04.1	+46.4	8
3	3	1	(Norway) Petter Solberg	(United Kingdom) Phil Mills	(Japan) 555 Subaru World Rally Team	Subaru Impreza S9 WRC '03	3:27:39.2	+1:21.5	6
4	4	8	(Finland) Janne Tuohino	(Finland) Jukka Aho	(United Kingdom) Ford Motor Co. Ltd.	Ford Focus RS WRC '03	3:27:59.8	+1:42.1	5
5	5	4	(Spain) Carlos Sainz	(Spain) Marc Martí	(France) Citroën Total WRT	Citroën Xsara WRC	3:28:44.7	+2:27.0	4
7	6	7	(Estonia) Markko Märtin	(United Kingdom) Michael Park	(United Kingdom) Ford Motor Co Ltd	Ford Focus RS WRC '03	3:31:56.0	+5:38.3	2
9	7	2	(Finland) Mikko Hirvonen	(Finland) Jarmo Lehtinen	(Japan) 555 Subaru World Rally Team	Subaru Impreza S9 WRC '03	3:35:35.9	+9:18.2	0
Retired SS12		6	(Belgium) Freddy Loix	(Belgium) Sven Smeets	(France) Marlboro Peugeot Total	Peugeot 307 WRC	Engine		0
Retired SS6		10	(Finland) Kristian Sohlberg	(Finland) Kaj Lindström	(Japan) Mitsubishi Motors	Mitsubishi Lancer WRC 04	Transmission		0
Retired SS4		9	(France) Gilles Panizzi	(France) Hervé Panizzi	(Japan) Mitsubishi Motors	Mitsubishi Lancer WRC 04	Gearbox		0

==== Special stages ====
Day	Stage	Stage name	Length	Winner	Car	Time	Class leaders
Leg 1 (6 Feb)	SS1	Lidsbron	19.59 km	(Finland) Marcus Grönholm	Peugeot 307 WRC	9:20.4	(Finland) Marcus Grönholm
Leg 1 (6 Feb)	SS2	Torntorp	19.21 km	(Spain) Carlos Sainz	Citroën Xsara WRC	10:10.0	(Finland) Marcus Grönholm
Leg 1 (6 Feb)	SS3	Granberget 1	52.57 km	(Estonia) Markko Märtin	Ford Focus RS WRC '03	24:47.4	(Estonia) Markko Märtin
Leg 1 (6 Feb)	SS4	Granberget 2	52.57 km	(Estonia) Markko Märtin	Ford Focus RS WRC '03	25:01.8	(Estonia) Markko Märtin
Leg 1 (6 Feb)	SS5	Hagfors Sprint 1	1.86 km	(France) Sébastien Loeb	Citroën Xsara WRC	1:58.6	(Estonia) Markko Märtin
Leg 2 (7 Feb)	SS6	Sundsjon 1	20.78 km	(Finland) Marcus Grönholm	Peugeot 307 WRC	11:22.4	(Estonia) Markko Märtin
Leg 2 (7 Feb)	SS7	Malta 1	11.25 km	(Finland) Marcus Grönholm	Peugeot 307 WRC	5:46.8	(Estonia) Markko Märtin
Leg 2 (7 Feb)	SS8	Fredriksberg	20.13 km	(Finland) Marcus Grönholm	Peugeot 307 WRC	11:55.7	(Estonia) Markko Märtin
Leg 2 (7 Feb)	SS9	Lejen	26.40 km	(France) Sébastien Loeb	Citroën Xsara WRC	13:45.2	(Estonia) Markko Märtin
Leg 2 (7 Feb)	SS10	Malta 2	11.25 km	(Finland) Marcus Grönholm	Peugeot 307 WRC	5:34.9	(Estonia) Markko Märtin
Leg 2 (7 Feb)	SS11	Sundsjon 1	20.78 km	(France) Sébastien Loeb	Citroën Xsara WRC	10:54.4	(France) Sébastien Loeb
Leg 2 (7 Feb)	SS12	Vargåsen	39.95 km	(France) Sébastien Loeb	Citroën Xsara WRC	20:57.9	(France) Sébastien Loeb
Leg 2 (7 Feb)	SS13	Hagfors Sprint 2	1.86 km	(Norway) Petter Solberg	Subaru Impreza S9 WRC '03	1:55.5	(France) Sébastien Loeb
Leg 3 (8 Feb)	SS14	Sågen 1	14.17 km	(Spain) Carlos Sainz	Citroën Xsara WRC	7:29.0	(France) Sébastien Loeb
Leg 3 (8 Feb)	SS15	Rämmen 1	23.35 km	(Finland) Janne Tuohino	Ford Focus RS WRC '03	12:08.6	(France) Sébastien Loeb
Leg 3 (8 Feb)	SS16	Hara 1	10.78 km	(Finland) Marcus Grönholm	Peugeot 307 WRC	6:03.6	(France) Sébastien Loeb
Leg 3 (8 Feb)	SS17	Sågen 2	14.17 km	(Spain) Carlos Sainz (Finland) Janne Tuohino	Citroën Xsara WRC; Ford Focus RS WRC '03	7:28.9	(France) Sébastien Loeb
Leg 3 (8 Feb)	SS18	Rämmen 2	23.35 km	(Finland) Marcus Grönholm	Peugeot 307 WRC	12:05.4	(France) Sébastien Loeb
Leg 3 (8 Feb)	SS19	Hara 2	10.78 km	(Finland) Marcus Grönholm	Peugeot 307 WRC	6:05.3	(France) Sébastien Loeb

==== Championship standings ====
Pos.	Drivers' championships			Co-drivers' championships			Manufacturers' championships		
Pos.	Move	Driver	Points	Move	Co-driver	Points	Move	Manufacturer	Points
1		(France) Sébastien Loeb	20		(Monaco) Daniel Elena	20	1	(France) Citroën Total WRT	24
2	2	(Finland) Marcus Grönholm	13	2	(Finland) Timo Rautiainen	13	1	(United Kingdom) Ford Motor Co. Ltd.	22
3	1	(Estonia) Markko Märtin	10	1	(United Kingdom) Michael Park	10		(France) Marlboro Peugeot Total	17
4	New entry	(Norway) Petter Solberg	8	New entry	(United Kingdom) Phil Mills	8	1	(Japan) 555 Subaru World Rally Team	10
5	2	(Belgium) François Duval	6	2	(Belgium) Stéphane Prévot	6	1	(Japan) Mitsubishi Motors	3

=== Production World Rally Championship ===
==== Classification ====
Position		No.	Driver	Co-driver	Entrant	Car	Time	Difference	Points
Event	Class	No.	Driver	Co-driver	Entrant	Car	Time	Difference	Points
16	1	41	(Finland) Jani Paasonen	(Finland) Sirkka Rautiainen	(Austria) OMV World Rally Team	Mitsubishi Lancer Evo VII	3:43:04.0		10
17	2	39	(United Kingdom) Alister McRae	(United Kingdom) David Senior	(United Kingdom) R.E.D World Rally Team	Subaru Impreza WRX STI	3:44:06.8	+1:02.8	8
20	3	33	(Spain) Daniel Solà	(Spain) Xavier Amigò	Ralliart Italy	Mitsubishi Lancer Evo VII	3:46:28.5	+3:24.5	6
22	4	46	(Poland) Tomasz Kuchar	(Poland) Maciej Wodniak	Kuchar Team Poland	Mitsubishi Lancer Evo VII	3:47:55.3	+4:51.3	5
24	5	43	(Italy) Gianluigi Galli	(Italy) Guido D'Amore	Ralliart Italy	Mitsubishi Lancer Evo VII	3:48:38.9	+5:34.9	4
26	6	31	(Japan) Toshihiro Arai	(New Zealand) Tony Sircombe	(Japan) Subaru Team Arai	Subaru Impreza WRX STI	3:49:12.1	+6:08.1	3
32	7	44	(Qatar) Nasser Al-Attiyah	(United Kingdom) Steve Lancaster	(United Kingdom) Autotek Motorsport	Subaru Impreza STI	3:57:25.0	+14:21.0	2
33	8	49	(Spain) Sergio López-Fombona	(Spain) Guifré Pujol	Ralliart Spain	Mitsubishi Lancer Evo VII	3:58:41.8	+15:37.8	1
34	9	37	(Sweden) Joakim Roman	(Sweden) Ragnar Spjuth	(Sweden) Milbrooks World Rally Team	Subaru Impreza WRX STI	4:00:12.7	+17:08.7	0
35	10	32	(Malaysia) Karamjit Singh	(Malaysia) Allen Oh	Proton Pert Malaysia	Proton Pert	4:00:18.5	+17:14.5	0
37	11	38	(Bulgaria) Georgi Geradzhiev Jr.	(Bulgaria) Nikola Popov	(Bulgaria) Racing Team Bulgartabac	Mitsubishi Lancer Evo VII	4:02:59.9	+19:55.9	0
38	12	36	(Mexico) Ricardo Triviño	(Spain) Jordi Barrabés	(Mexico) Triviño Racing	Mitsubishi Lancer Evo VII	4:03:28.4	+20:24.4	0
39	13	50	(Germany) Sebastian Vollak	(Germany) Michael Kölbach	(Austria) OMV World Rally Team	Mitsubishi Lancer Evo VI	4:03:57.8	+20:53.8	0
40	14	45	(Italy) Fabio Frisiero	(Italy) Giovanni Agnese	(Italy) Top Run SRL	Subaru Impreza WRX STI	4:06:15.9	+23:11.9	0
46	15	47	(Spain) Xavier Pons	(Spain) Oriol Julià	Ralliart Spain	Mitsubishi Lancer Evo VII	4:34:35.0	+51:31.0	0
Retired SS8		42	(United Kingdom) Mark Higgins	(United Kingdom) Michael Gibson	(Italy) Top Run SRL	Subaru Impreza STI	Accident		0
Retired SS7		35	(Argentina) Marcos Ligato	(Argentina) Rubén García	(Italy) Top Run SRL	Subaru Impreza WRX STI	Accident		0
Retired SS1		40	(Austria) Manfred Stohl	(Austria) Ilka Minor	(Austria) OMV World Rally Team	Mitsubishi Lancer Evo VII	Accident		0

==== Special stages ====
Day	Stage	Stage name	Length	Winner	Car	Time	Class leaders
Leg 1 (6 Feb)	SS1	Lidsbron	19.59 km	(Finland) Jani Paasonen	Mitsubishi Lancer Evo VII	10:17.6	(Finland) Jani Paasonen
Leg 1 (6 Feb)	SS2	Torntorp	19.21 km	(Finland) Jani Paasonen	Mitsubishi Lancer Evo VII	10:45.5	(Finland) Jani Paasonen
Leg 1 (6 Feb)	SS3	Granberget 1	52.57 km	(Finland) Jani Paasonen	Mitsubishi Lancer Evo VII	26:58.7	(Finland) Jani Paasonen
Leg 1 (6 Feb)	SS4	Granberget 2	52.57 km	(Finland) Jani Paasonen	Mitsubishi Lancer Evo VII	27:10.2	(Finland) Jani Paasonen
Leg 1 (6 Feb)	SS5	Hagfors Sprint 1	1.86 km	(Finland) Jani Paasonen	Mitsubishi Lancer Evo VII	2:07.3	(Finland) Jani Paasonen
Leg 2 (7 Feb)	SS6	Sundsjon 1	20.78 km	(Finland) Jani Paasonen	Mitsubishi Lancer Evo VII	12:13.3	(Finland) Jani Paasonen
Leg 2 (7 Feb)	SS7	Malta 1	11.25 km	(Japan) Toshihiro Arai	Subaru Impreza WRX STI	6:14.8	(Finland) Jani Paasonen
Leg 2 (7 Feb)	SS8	Fredriksberg	20.13 km	(Finland) Jani Paasonen	Mitsubishi Lancer Evo VII	12:36.6	(Finland) Jani Paasonen
Leg 2 (7 Feb)	SS9	Lejen	26.40 km	(Finland) Jani Paasonen	Mitsubishi Lancer Evo VII	14:53.8	(Finland) Jani Paasonen
Leg 2 (7 Feb)	SS10	Malta 2	11.25 km	(Finland) Jani Paasonen	Mitsubishi Lancer Evo VII	6:10.2	(Finland) Jani Paasonen
Leg 2 (7 Feb)	SS11	Sundsjon 1	20.78 km	(Finland) Jani Paasonen	Mitsubishi Lancer Evo VII	11:58.6	(Finland) Jani Paasonen
Leg 2 (7 Feb)	SS12	Vargåsen	39.95 km	(United Kingdom) Alister McRae	Subaru Impreza WRX STI	22:55.5	(Finland) Jani Paasonen
Leg 2 (7 Feb)	SS13	Hagfors Sprint 2	1.86 km	(Finland) Jani Paasonen	Mitsubishi Lancer Evo VII	2:03.7	(Finland) Jani Paasonen
Leg 3 (8 Feb)	SS14	Sågen 1	14.17 km	(Finland) Jani Paasonen	Mitsubishi Lancer Evo VII	8:08.3	(Finland) Jani Paasonen
Leg 3 (8 Feb)	SS15	Rämmen 1	23.35 km	(Finland) Jani Paasonen	Mitsubishi Lancer Evo VII	13:06.7	(Finland) Jani Paasonen
Leg 3 (8 Feb)	SS16	Hara 1	10.78 km	(Japan) Toshihiro Arai	Subaru Impreza WRX STI	6:36.6	(Finland) Jani Paasonen
Leg 3 (8 Feb)	SS17	Sågen 2	14.17 km	(Italy) Gianluigi Galli	Mitsubishi Lancer Evo VII	8:02.8	(Finland) Jani Paasonen
Leg 3 (8 Feb)	SS18	Rämmen 2	23.35 km	(Italy) Gianluigi Galli	Mitsubishi Lancer Evo VII	13:00.1	(Finland) Jani Paasonen
Leg 3 (8 Feb)	SS19	Hara 2	10.78 km	(Japan) Toshihiro Arai	Subaru Impreza WRX STI	6:34.0	(Finland) Jani Paasonen

==== Championship standings ====
Pos.	Drivers' championships		
Pos.	Move	Driver	Points
1	New entry	(Finland) Jani Paasonen	10
2	New entry	(United Kingdom) Alister McRae	8
3	New entry	(Spain) Daniel Solà	6
4	New entry	(Poland) Tomasz Kuchar	5
5	New entry	(Italy) Gianluigi Galli	4
