= 2009 British Rally Championship =

Seasons
- ← 2008 2010 →

The 2009 MSA British Rally Championship season was the 51st season of the British Rally Championship. The season consisted of six rounds and began on 28 March with International Rally North Wales. The season ended on 26 September, at the International Rally Yorkshire. Irishman Keith Cronin won the title at his first attempt after a season-long battle with Mark Higgins.

== Calendar ==
The calendar still has six rounds in 2009. Last years season climax, Wales Rally GB is no longer a round of the BRC and is replaced with a new season opener, the Bulldog International Rally North Wales.

Round	Dates	Location	Rally HQ	Surface
1	28 March	Bulldog International Rally North Wales	Bala	Gravel
2	17–18 April	Pirelli International Rally	Carlisle	Gravel
3	22–23 May	Jim Clark International Rally	Duns	Asphalt
4	10–11 July	Isle of Man International Rally	Douglas	Asphalt
5	21–22 August	toddsleap.com Ulster International Rally	Antrim	Asphalt
6	26 September	International Rally Yorkshire	Pickering	Gravel

== Major Entries ==
=== R4 Class ===
Team (sponsor)	Car	Driver	Co-driver
PIRELLI TEG SPORT	Subaru Impreza	(United Kingdom) Mark Higgins	(United Kingdom) Bryan Thomas
PIRELLI TEG SPORT	Subaru Impreza	(United Kingdom) Adam Gould	(United Kingdom) Sebastian Marshall
TEAM JRM LICO	Mitsubishi Lancer Evo	(United Kingdom) Stuart Jones	(United Kingdom) Andy Bull
TEAM JRM LICO	Mitsubishi Lancer Evo	(United Kingdom) David Bogie	(United Kingdom) Kevin Rae
TEAM JRM LICO	Mitsubishi Lancer Evo	(Iceland) Daniel Sigurdarson	(United Kingdom) Andy Bull
REVOLUTION WHEELS	Subaru Impreza	(United Kingdom) Euan Thorburn	(United Kingdom) Campbell Roy
REVOLUTION WHEELS	Subaru Impreza	(United Kingdom) Rob Swann	(United Kingdom) Darren Garrod
REVOLUTION WHEELS	Subaru Impreza	(United Kingdom) Geoff Jones	(United Kingdom) Sam Collis
Cronin Motorsport	Mitsubishi Lancer Evo	(Republic of Ireland) Keith Cronin	(Republic of Ireland) Greg Shinnors
PPG Protective & Marine Coatings	Mitsubishi Lancer Evo	(United Kingdom) Alastair Fisher	(Republic of Ireland) Rory Kennedy
Ramsport	Mitsubishi Lancer Evo	(United Kingdom) Dave Weston Jnr	(United Kingdom) Aled Davies
Mellors Elliott Motorsport	Proton Satria Neo	(United Kingdom) Guy Wilks	(United Kingdom) Phil Pugh

== Results ==
Round	Rally name	Podium finishers		
Round	Rally name	Rank	Driver / Co-Driver	Car
1	Bulldog International Rally North Wales (28 March)	1	(Republic of Ireland) Keith Cronin/ (Republic of Ireland) Greg Shinnors	Mitsubishi Lancer Evo
1	Bulldog International Rally North Wales (28 March)	2	(United Kingdom) Mark Higgins/ (United Kingdom) Bryan Thomas	Subaru Impreza N11
1	Bulldog International Rally North Wales (28 March)	3	(United Kingdom) Stuart Jones/ (United Kingdom) Andy Bull	Mitsubishi Lancer Evo
2	Pirelli International Rally (17/18 April)	1	(Republic of Ireland) Keith Cronin/ (Republic of Ireland) Greg Shinnors	Mitsubishi Lancer Evo
2	Pirelli International Rally (17/18 April)	2	(United Kingdom) Mark Higgins/ (United Kingdom) Bryan Thomas	Subaru Impreza N11
2	Pirelli International Rally (17/18 April)	3	(United Kingdom) David Bogie/ (United Kingdom) Kevin Rae	Mitsubishi Lancer Evo 10
3	Jim Clark International Rally (22/23 May)	1	(United Kingdom) Mark Higgins/ (United Kingdom) Bryan Thomas	Subaru Impreza N11
3	Jim Clark International Rally (22/23 May)	2	(Republic of Ireland) Keith Cronin/ (Republic of Ireland) Greg Shinnors	Mitsubishi Lancer Evo
3	Jim Clark International Rally (22/23 May)	3	(United Kingdom) Adam Gould/ (United Kingdom) Sebastian Marshall	Subaru Impreza N14
4	2009 Rally Isle of Man (10/11 July)	1	(United Kingdom) Mark Higgins/ (United Kingdom) Bryan Thomas	Subaru Impreza N11
4	2009 Rally Isle of Man (10/11 July)	2	(Republic of Ireland) Keith Cronin/ (Republic of Ireland) Greg Shinnors	Mitsubishi Evo 9
4	2009 Rally Isle of Man (10/11 July)	3	(United Kingdom) Alastair Fisher/ (Republic of Ireland) Rory Kennedy	Mitsubishi Evo 9
5	Toddsleap.com Ulster International Rally (21/22 August)	1	(United Kingdom) Mark Higgins/ (United Kingdom) Bryan Thomas	Subaru Impreza N11
5	Toddsleap.com Ulster International Rally (21/22 August)	2	(United Kingdom) Alastair Fisher/ (Republic of Ireland) Rory Kennedy	Mitsubishi Evo 9
5	Toddsleap.com Ulster International Rally (21/22 August)	3	(United Kingdom) David Bogie/ (United Kingdom) Kevin Rae	Mitsubisho Evo 10
6	International Rally Yorkshire (26 September)	1	(Republic of Ireland) Keith Cronin/ (Republic of Ireland) Greg Shinnors	Mitsubishi Evo 9
6	International Rally Yorkshire (26 September)	2	(United Kingdom) Stuart Jones/ (United Kingdom) Andy Bull	Mitsubishi Lancer Evo 10
6	International Rally Yorkshire (26 September)	3	(United Kingdom) Jonny Greer/ (United Kingdom) Kirsty Riddick	Mitsubishi Evo 9

== Drivers' Championship standings ==
These results are based on overall positions in the rally, in which there may be entries which are not eligible for BRC points. Only the five best results from the six rallies count towards a driver's final score. (*) denotes the dropped score.

Pos	Driver	BUL	PIR	JCR	IOM	ULS	YOR	Pts
1	(Republic of Ireland) Keith Cronin	1	1	7	2	Ret*	1	106
2	(United Kingdom) Mark Higgins	2	2	6	1	4	Ret*	96
3	(United Kingdom) Alastair Fisher	7*	4	10	3	6	6	82.5
4	(United Kingdom) Dave Weston Jnr	6	6	Ret*	6	14	5	75
5	(United Kingdom) Jonathan Greer	8	5	11	Ret*	Ret	3	62
6	(United Kingdom) Adam Gould	4	Ret*	8	Ret	Ret	4	53.5
7	(United Kingdom) Martin McCormack	14	11	15	7	12		53
8	(United Kingdom) Chris Firth	13	8	23	Ret*	26	11	49.5
9	(United Kingdom) David Bogie	5	3	Ret*	20	11	Ret	49
10	(United Kingdom) Euan Thorburn	Ret*	Ret	9	5	Ret	7	48
11	(United Kingdom) Stuart Jones	3					2	43
12	(United Kingdom) Jason Pritchard	11	30	17	8	Ret*	15	41
13	(Republic of Ireland) Craig Breen	10	10	Ret	Ret	17		32
14	(United Kingdom) Tom Walster	9	21	16	9			31
15	(United Kingdom) Luke Pinder	25	Ret*	25	12	40	13	29
16	(United Kingdom) Gordon Nichol	28*	23	24	17	32	16	26.5
17	(United Kingdom) Nick Everard	Ret*	25	Ret	18	37	14	23.5
18	(United Kingdom) Richard Sykes	Ret*	29	27	Ret	30	9	20
19	(United Kingdom) David Harrison	Ret	22	Ret	13	31		17
20	(United Kingdom) Andrew Hockridge	26		26	Ret	20		14
21	(United Kingdom) Mark Donnelly	16	Ret		Ret	27		14
22	(Iceland) Daniel Siguardason		7					12
22	(United Kingdom) Geoff Jones			12				12
24	(Finland) Matti Rantanen	Ret	Ret	13	Ret	Ret		11
25	(United Kingdom) Mark Gamble	21	18	18	Ret		Ret	11
26	(United Kingdom) Kris Hall	Ret	Ret	Ret	11	Ret	Ret	10
27	(United Kingdom) Kyle Orr	17	13	Ret		Ret		10
28	(United Kingdom) Stevie Brown	23		20		39		10
29	(Australia) Molly Taylor	24	20	28	Ret	36	Ret	9
30	(United Kingdom) Rob Swann	Ret	12					8
31	(Republic of Ireland) Joseph McGonigle	27	24	Ret	16	Ret		8
32	(United Kingdom) Steve Graham	31	28	Ret	21	38		8
33	(United Kingdom) Harry Hunt				15	Ret		7
34	(United Kingdom) Martyn Jones	32	14					7
35	(United Kingdom) Stefan Davis	30		21	Ret			6
36	(United Kingdom) Peter Stephenson		15					5
37	(United Kingdom) Barry Greer	Ret	16			Ret		4
38	(Republic of Ireland) Ross Forde	22	17					4
39	(Republic of Ireland) Finn McCaul	Ret	27	Ret	22			2
40	(New Zealand) Patrick Malley	Ret	19					1
41	(United Kingdom) Rory Hall	20						1
42	(Sweden) Andreas Sjolander	Ret	26					1
	(United Kingdom) Guy Wilks		Ret					0
	(United Kingdom) Phillip Morrow		Ret					0
	(United Kingdom) Thomas Watson				Ret			0
	(Republic of Ireland) Daniel Barry					Ret	Ret	0
Pos	Driver	BUL	PIR	JCR	IOM	ULS	YOR	Pts

Key
Colour	Result
Gold	Winner
Silver	2nd place
Bronze	3rd place
Green	Non-podium finish
Purple	Did not finish (Ret)
Black	Disqualified (DSQ)
Black	Excluded (EXC)
White	Did not start (DNS)
*	Joker played

*NOTE: All finishers score points
