= Andrew Nesbitt =

Irish racing driver (born 1960)

- Born: 2 September 1960 (age 66); Newtonhamilton
- Citizenship: Northern Ireland

Irish Tarmac Rally Championship
- Years active: 1988–2007
- Wins: 18
- Podiums: 28
- Best finish: Champion in 2000 and 2002

Andrew Nesbitt (born 2 September 1960) is a former rally driver and businessman from Newtownhamilton, County Armagh, Northern Ireland. He won two Irish Tarmac Rally Championships (2000 and 2002) and won the Donegal International Rally six times (1996, 1998, 2000, 2002, 2003, and 2006). His co-driver was James O'Brien from County Cork.

== Rally career ==
Nesbitt is best known for driving the Subaru Impreza but first made his name driving a Toyota Celica on the 1996 Donegal International Rally.

Since then he has had a host of rally wins, such as in 2000 when he won the Donegal International Rally while recording the fastest time on all 22 stages. He went on to become Irish Tarmac Rally Champion in 2000 and 2002.

Nesbitt has taken a number of wins since 2002, but has failed to reclaim the tarmac title. He was often leading rallies or was in a strong position, until mechanical failures let him down.

Nesbitt won all the events he finished in 2000, when he won the Tarmac Championship for the first time. In 2002, he won every round of the Tarmac Championship he finished too.

Previously, his car has been prepared by McKinstry Motorsport. In 2004, Nesbitt realised his dream by entering the WRC (World Rally Championship) for the first time in a Subaru Impreza WRC. He entered the snow event in Sweden and finished 28th, coming 5th amongst the privateer crews. Among the achievements of Nesbitt's career was winning the Jim Clark Memorial Rally for three consecutive years, breaking the record in the process. Nesbitt also holds the record of wins at the Donegal International Rally, with 6 wins, ahead of Billy Coleman and Bertie Fisher (each with 4 wins).

On 11 and 12 August 2007, at Maasmechelen in Belgium, Nesbitt contested his first ever round of the FIA European Championships for Rallycross Drivers with a 550+bhp strong spare Saab 9-3 T16 4x4 of Swede Per Eklund.

By 2020, Nesbitt had competed in around ninety events, winning 31, 19 of which were international rally wins. He has won a total of 260 stage wins.

== Cars ==
During his career, Nesbitt was best for driving the Subaru Impreza WRC, of which he has used many different variants. His two Tarmac Championships were won in a Subaru Impreza S5 WRC '99 (2000 championship) and a Subaru Impreza S6 WRC '00 (2002 championship), with "Cuisine de France" livery. He has also taken wins in other variants, like his 2005 Rally of the Lakes win in an S9 WRC '03. He has also taken wins in other cars, such as his 1998 Donegal International Rally win in a Toyota Celica Turbo 4WD or his 2006 Donegal Win in a Mitsubishi Lancer WRC 05.

== Rallying style ==
Nesbitt himself stated that he "drives it to the absolute maximum" on every rally stage he does. One notable performance was in Donegal in 1999; after going off on stage one and losing three minutes to drop to 114th, Nesbitt pushed hard to finish fourth. Early in his career he had some large crashes, such as when his car went through a hedge at 120 miles per hour and spun through the air in the 1997 Ulster Rally. This maximum-attack style of driving has led to some memorable moments with co-driver James O'Brien, with O'Brien telling Nesbitt to slow down in some rallies. Fellow competitors like Eugene Donnelly have complimented his rallying skill and consistency.

== Irish Tarmac Championship victories ==
Irish Tarmac Rally Championship wins:

· 2006 Donegal International Rally - Nesbitt, O'Brien (Mitsubishi Lancer WRC '05)
· 2005 Rally of the Lakes - Nesbitt, O'Brien (Subaru Impreza S9 WRC '03)
· 2004 Jim Clark Rally - Nesbitt, O'Brien (Subaru Impreza S9 WRC '03)
· 2003 Jim Clark Rally - Nesbitt, O'Brien (Subaru Impreza S7 WRC '01)
· 2003 Donegal International Rally - Nesbitt, O'Brien (Subaru Impreza S7 WRC '01)
· 2002 - Cork 20 Rally - Nesbitt, O'Brien (Subaru Impreza S6 WRC '00)
· 2002 - Ulster Rally - Nesbitt, O'Brien (Subaru Impreza S6 WRC '00)
· 2002 - Manx International Rally - Nesbitt, O'Brien (Subaru Impreza S6 WRC '00)
· 2002 - Jim Clark Rally - Nesbitt, O'Brien (Subaru Impreza S6 WRC '00)
· 2002 - Donegal International Rally - Nesbitt, O'Brien (Subaru Impreza S6 WRC '00)
· 2002 - Rally of the Lakes - Nesbitt, O'Brien (Subaru Impreza S6 WRC '00)
· 2002 - Circuit of Ireland - Nesbitt, O'Brien (Subaru Impreza S6 WRC '00)
· 2000 - Cork 20 Rally - Nesbitt, O'Brien (Subaru Impreza S5 WRC '99)
· 2000 - Manx Rally - Nesbitt, O'Brien (Subaru Impreza S5 WRC '99)
· 2000 - Donegal International Rally - Nesbitt, O'Brien (Subaru Impreza S5 WRC '99)
· 2000 - Fisher Engineering Summit Rally - Nesbitt, O'Brien (Subaru Impreza S5 WRC '99)
· 1998 - Donegal International Rally - Nesbitt, O'Brien (Toyota Celica Turbo 4WD (ST185))
· 1996 - Donegal International Rally - Nesbitt, Millar (Toyota Celica Turbo 4WD (ST185))

Overall, Nesbitt has taken 18 Tarmac Championship victories; 17 with co-driver James O'Brien and 1 with co-driver George Millar.

== Other Irish Tarmac Championship podiums ==
Other Irish Tarmac Championship podiums (2nd and 3rd place finishes):

· 2005 Circuit of Ireland - Nesbitt, O'Brien (Subaru Impreza S9 WRC '03): 2nd place
· 2003 Circuit of Ireland - Nesbitt, O'Brien (Subaru Impreza S7 WRC '01): 2nd place
· 1999 Cork 20 Rally - Nesbitt, O'Brien (Subaru Impreza S5 WRC '98): 2nd place
· 1999 Donegal International Rally - Nesbitt, O'Brien (Subaru Impreza 555): 3rd place
· 1999 Circuit of Ireland - Nesbitt, O'Brien (Subaru Impreza 555): 2nd place
· 1998 Rally of the Lakes - Nesbitt, O'Brien (Toyota Celica Turbo 4WD (ST185)): 3rd place
· 1998 Circuit of Ireland - Nesbitt, O'Brien (Toyota Celica Turbo 4WD (ST185)): 3rd place
· 1998 Galway International Rally - Nesbitt, O'Brien (Toyota Celica Turbo 4WD (ST185)): 3rd place
· 1997 Ulster Rally - Nesbitt, Kennedy (Toyota Celica Turbo 4WD (ST185)): 3rd place
· 1996 Circuit of Ireland - Nesbitt, Millar (Toyota Celica Turbo 4WD (ST185)): 2nd place
