= Mark Gamble =

Australian rules footballer

Personal information
- Full name: Mark Gamble
- Born: 6 April 1962 (age 64)
- Original team: Frankston (VFA)
- Height: 188 cm (6 ft 2 in)
- Weight: 87 kg (192 lb)
- Position: Defence

Playing career^{1}
Years	Club	Games (Goals)
1986–88	St Kilda	35 (0)
- ^{1} Playing statistics correct to the end of 1988.

Mark Gamble (born 6 April 1962) is a former Australian rules footballer who played with St Kilda in the Victorian Football League (VFL).
