= Mike Horne =

M. A. C. Horne FCIT, who wrote as Mike Horne, was a British transport writer who specialised in the history of London's railways. He died of a heart attack on 26 March 2020 (not connected with COVID-19).

== Selected publications ==
- The Victoria Line - A short history (1988) ISBN 1 870354 02 8
- The Northern Line (second edn 1999) ISBN 1 85414 208 9
- The Jubilee Line (2000) ISBN 1 85414 220 8
- The Bakerloo Line (second edn 2001) ISBN 1 85414 248 8
- The Metropolitan Line (2003) ISBN 1 85414 275 5
- The Victoria Line (second edition 2004) ISBN 1 85414 281 X
- The District Line (2006) ISBN 1 85414 292 5
- The Piccadilly Tube - A History of the First Hundred Years (2007) ISBN 978 1 85414 305 1 (Hardback)
- London’s District Railway: A History of the Metropolitan District Railway. (2018) ISBN 978-1-85414-425-6
- The Last Link - The First 30 Years of the Hampstead Railway ISBN 978 0 9507416 6 6
- 150 Years of the Hammersmith & City Railway Published jointly with London Underground Ltd
- The Aldwych Branch of the Piccadilly Line (with Antony Badsey-Ellis). Capital Transport 2009 ISBN 978 1 85414 321 1
