= Murray Grierson =

Murray Grierson, is a Scottish rally driver from Dalbeattie.

Born in Balmaclellan in 1948, Grierson began rallying a Mini in the early 1970s. He was a stalwart of the Scottish Rally Championship, winning it outright in 1987, using an Opel Kadett 400 and again in 1993, using an MG Metro 6R4. In 1988, Grierson turned his attention to the British National Rally Championship, winning numerous rallies outright and finishing runner-up in the Championship in 1988, using an Opel Kadett 400 and again in 1997 and 1998, using a Subaru Impreza 555.

Latterly, Grierson was often seen at rounds of the World Rally Championship where he was gravel note leader for Alister McRae in the Hyundai Accent WRC and for Colin McRae in the Subaru Impreza WRC, Ford Focus WRC and the Citroen Xsara WRC.
