= Galway International Rally =

Annual motor rally in Galway, Ireland

- Category: Rally
- Inaugural season: 1971
- Drivers' champion: (Republic of Ireland) Josh Moffett
- Co-Drivers' champion: (Republic of Ireland) Andy Hayes

Irish Tarmac Rally Championship

European Rally Championship (1975-1982)

Galway International Rally
- Dates: 5 February 2022 - 6 February 2022
- Frequency: Annual
- Location: County Galway
- Country: (Republic of Ireland) Ireland
- Most recent: 2022
- Organiser: Galway Motor Club
- Sponsor: Corrib Oil
- Website: Website; Facebook page

The Galway Rally, or Galway International Rally, is an annual motorsport tarmac rallying event held in Galway, Ireland. Promoted and organised by Galway Motor Club, the rally was first run in 1971.

== History ==
The rally has been staged annually as an International event from its inception in 1971, being the first international rally run in Ireland. From 1975 to 1982, the Galway International Rally was included as a stage of the European Rally Championship, while in 1978 the rally hosted the opening stage of the first Irish Tarmac Rally Championship. The rally introduced the first computer-generated result system (1975), saw the first female Clerk of the Course, Bridget Brophy (in 1982), and introduced the youngest Clerk of the Course of an any International Rally, Mike Smith (in 1988).

For various reasons, the events did not run in 1983, 1987, 2000, 2001, 2003, 2018 and 2022.

== Roll of honour ==
Year	Full Event Name	Overall winner	Co-driver	Car
2024	Corrib Oil Galway International Rally	Keith Cronin	Mikie Galvin	Ford Fiesta Rally2
2023	Corrib Oil Galway International Rally	Meirion Evans	Jonathan Jackson	Volkswagen Polo GTI R5
2022	Corrib Oil Galway International Rally	Josh Moffett	Andy Hayes	Hyundai i20 R5
2021	No event (COVID-19 pandemic)			
2020	Corrib Oil Galway International Rally	Alastair Fisher	Gordon Noble	Volkswagen Polo GTI R5
2019	Corrib Oil Galway International Rally	Craig Breen	Paul Nagle	Ford Fiesta R5
2018	No event (Cancelled)			
2017	Corrib Oil Galway International Rally	Garry Jennings	Rory Kennedy	Subaru Impreza S12B WRC '07
2016	Corrib Oil Galway International Rally	Garry Jennings	Rory Kennedy	Subaru Impreza S12B WRC '07
2015	Colm Quinn BMW Galway International Rally	Donagh Kelly	Kevin Flanagan	Ford Focus RS WRC '08
2014	Colm Quinn BMW Galway International Rally	Declan Boyle	Brian Boyle	Subaru Impreza S12B WRC '07
2013	Safety Direct Galway International Rally	Keith Cronin	Marshall Clarke	Subaru Impreza S11 WRC '05
2012	Safety Direct Galway International Rally	Darren Gass	Enda Sherry	Subaru Impreza S10 WRC '04
2011	Safety Direct Galway International Rally	Tim McNulty	Paul Kiely	Subaru Impreza S12B WRC '07
2010	Safety Direct Galway International Rally	Gareth MacHale	Brian Murphy	Ford Focus RS WRC '06
2009	Galway International Rally	Eugene Donnelly	Paddy Toner	Škoda Fabia WRC
2008	Galway International Rally	Mark Higgins	Rory Kennedy	Subaru Impreza S12 WRC '06
2007	First Choice Flooring Galway International Rally	Marcus Grönholm	Timo Rautiainen	Ford Focus RS WRC '06
2006	First Choice Flooring Galway International Rally	Eugene Donnelly	Paul Kiely	Toyota Corolla WRC
2005	First Choice Flooring Galway International Rally	Eugene Donnelly	Paul Kiely	Toyota Corolla WRC
2004	First Choice Flooring Galway International Rally	Tapio Laukkanen	Harri Kaapro	Subaru Impreza S7 WRC '01
2003	No event			
2002	West International Rally	Eugene Donnelly	Paul Kiely	Subaru Impreza S4 WRC '98
2001	No event (Cancelled)			
2000	No event (Cancelled)			
1999	Statoil Galway International Rally	Bertie Fisher	Rory Kennedy	Subaru Impreza 555
1998	Statoil Galway International Rally	Austin MacHale	Brian Murphy	Toyota Celica Turbo 4WD
1997	Statoil Galway International Rally	Austin MacHale	Brian Murphy	Toyota Celica Turbo 4WD (ST185)
1996	Statoil Galway International Rally	Bertie Fisher	Rory Kennedy Subaru Impreza 555	
1995	Statoil Galway International Rally	Frank Meagher	Pat Moloughney	Ford Escort RS Cosworth
1994	Statoil Galway International Rally	Kenny McKinstry	Robbie Philpott	Subaru Legacy RS
1993	Galway International Rally	Austin MacHale	Dermot O'Gorman	Toyota Celica GT-4 (ST165)
1992	Clarenbridge Crystal Galway International Rally	Kenny McKinstry	Robbie Philpott	Subaru Legacy RS
1991	Skoda Sport Galway International Rally	Austin MacHale	Dermot O'Gorman	BMW M3
1990	Lydon House Bakery Galway International Rally	Austin MacHale	Ronan McNamee	BMW M3
1989	Lydon House Bakery Galway International Rally	Mark Lovell	Ronan Morgan	Ford Sierra RS Cosworth
1988	Lydon House Galway International Rally	Mark Lovell	Roger Freeman	Ford Sierra RS Cosworth
1987	No event			
1986	Clarenbridge Crystal Galway International Rally	Billy Coleman	Ronan Morgan	Porsche 911 SC RS
1985	Galway International Rally	Austin MacHale	Christy Farrell	Opel Manta 400
1984	Agip Galway International Rally	Brendan Fagan	Ronan McNamee	Vauxhall Chevette 2300 HSR
1983	No event			
1982	BP Galway International Rally	Jimmy McRae	Ian Grindrod	Opel Ascona 400
1981	Galway International Rally	Ger Buckley	Mr Murphy	Vauxhall Chevette 2300 HSR
1980	Galway International Rally	Jimmy McRae	Frank Main	Vauxhall Chevette 2300 HS
1979	Galway International Rally	Billy Coleman	Frank O'Donoghue	Ford Escort RS 1800 MKII
1978	Galway International Rally	John Taylor	Phil Short	Ford Escort RS 1800 MKII
1977	Galway International Rally	Roger Clark	Jim Porter	Ford Escort RS 1800 MKII
1976	STP Galway International Rally	Billy Coleman	Jim Porter	Ford Escort RS 1800 MKII
1975	STP Galway Rally	Dessie McCartney	Terry Harryman	Porsche 911 Carrera RS 2.7
1974	Galway Rally	No data	No data	
1973	STP Galway Rally	Adrian Boyd	Beatty Crawford	Ford Escort RS 1600 MKI
1972	STP Galway Rally	Ronnie McCartney	Dessie McCartney	Triumph 2.5 Pi
1971	STP Galway International Rally	Cathal Curley	Austin Frazer	Ford Escort Twin Cam

Top drivers with most wins (>1) / most starts (>11). (As of 2022)

Driver	Most Wins	Most Starts
Austin MacHale	6	23
Eugene Donnelly	4	12
Billy Coleman	3	12
Mark Lovell	2	2
Jimmy McRae	2	5
Kenny McKinstry	2	10
Bertie Fisher	2	12
Garry Jennings	2	14
Frank Meagher	1	12
Pat Kelly	0	17
Tommy Flanagan	0	14
Eamonn Boland	0	13
David Quigley	0	13
Tom Flaherty	0	13
