= Steve Graham =

Paralympic skiing coach (born 1962)

Personal information
- Nationality: Australia
- Born: 23 January 1962 (age 64) Palm Beach, Queensland

Steve Graham (born 23 January 1962) is a retired Australian Paralympic winter sport coach. He was head coach of Australia's Winter Paralympic team for the 1994 Winter Paralympics, 2006 Winter Paralympics, 2010 Winter Paralympics and 2014 Winter Paralympics. As of 2014, after the Sochi winter Paralympics Graham ceased to be the current head coach of the Australian Paralympic Committee's Winter Paralympic program.

== Personal ==
Graham was born on 23 January 1962 in Palm Beach, Queensland. His hobbies include doing yoga and going to the beach.

== Coaching ==
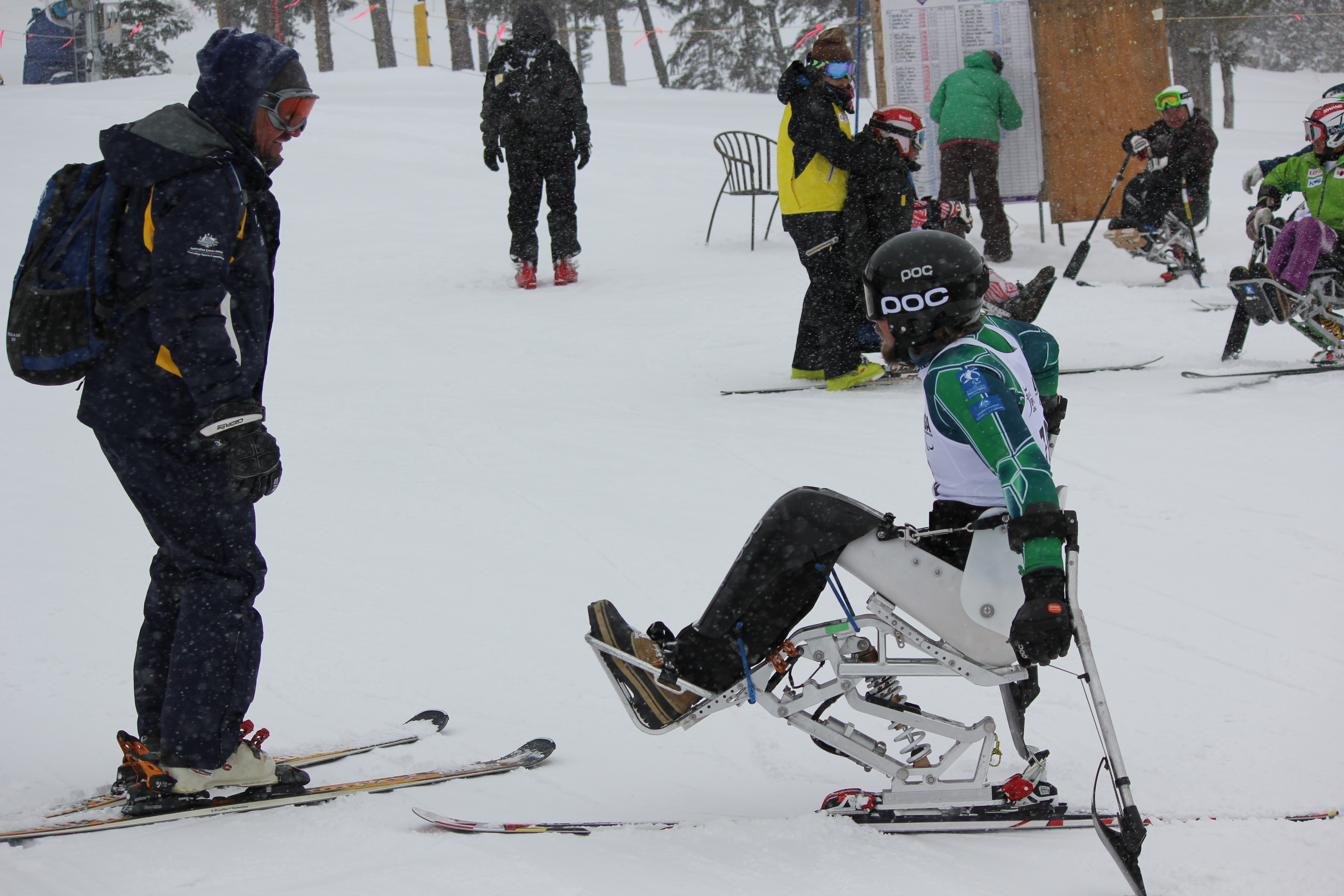
Steve Graham and skier Lincoln Budge at the 2012 IPC NorAm Cup

Graham is a skiing coach for Paralympic athletes whose focus is coaching on sitting, standing and vision impaired skiers. His coaching philosophy involves athletes training hard every day as if the next day they would be competing in an event. He mentored and coached Michael Milton, Australia's first Winter Paralympics medallist. Milton gave one of the gold medals he earned at the 2002 Winter Paralympics to Graham. Graham also coached Jessica Gallagher, Australia's first female Winter Paralympic medallist, and Cameron Rahles Rahbula and Toby Kane. He helped the Australian ski team finish sixth at the IPC Alpine Skiing World Championships in Korea in 2009, where two athletes that he coached individually, Cameron Rahles‐Rahbula and Shannon Dallas, finished in first place. Other athletes he has coached include Mitchell Gourley, who finished first in the giant slalom event at Australian National Skiing Championships.

Graham was the assistant coach for the team at the 1992 Winter Paralympics. He then became head coach of Australia's Winter Paralympic team for the 1994 Winter Paralympics, 2006 Winter Paralympics, 2010 Winter Paralympics and the 2014 Winter Paralympics. In 2003, he was named the Australian Paralympic Committee’s Winter Paralympic Program head coach, and in 2010 signed a four-year deal to remain on in the position. As of 2014, Graham is the current head coach of the Australian Paralympic Committee's Winter Paralympic program. According to an interview published on the Australian Paralympic Committee site, his immediate priority was to prepare athletes for the 2014 Winter Paralympics, while at the same time working to insure the Australian winter sport program will be competitive for the 2018 Winter Paralympics. Part of the effort involves having an athlete retention of seventy-five percent.

Graham has spoken out against the classification system used by the International Paralympic Committee when it comes to classifying skiers. He felt the system was unfair. In an interview with Cerebral Palsy Australia, he said "We have three of the best 5 or 6 skiers in the world in the standing class and in the old system we would’ve won 8 or 10 medals. The new system definitely affected the Australian team achieving its medal goals.”

== Recognition ==
In 2010, Graham was a finalist the Coach of the Year award given by the Australian Institute of Sport. That same year, Graham was also named by Australian Paralympic Committee as the Coach of the Year.
