= Keith Cronin =

Irish rally driver (born 1986)

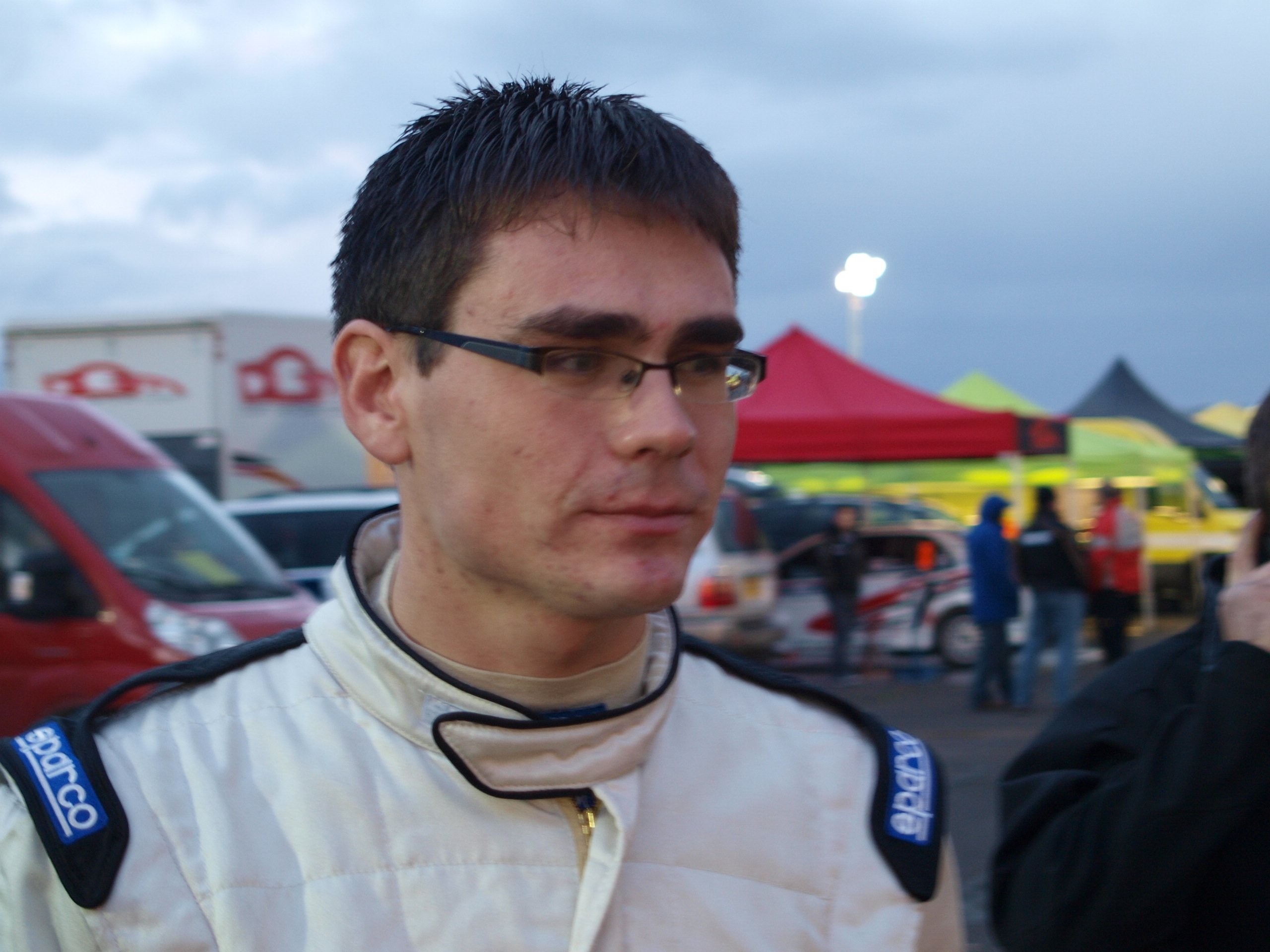
- Cronin at service before the start of the 2010 Rally Scotland
- Nationality: (Republic of Ireland) Irish
- Born: 18 July 1986 (age 40)

British Rally Championship career
- Debut season: 2004
- Current team: Autosport Technology
- Co-driver: Barry McNulty, Greg Shinnors, Marshall Clark, Mikie Galvin
- Former teams: Pirelli TEG Sport, TTec Rally Prep, Cronin Motorsport, Proton R3 Malaysia Rally Team
- Wins: 15
- Best finish: 1st in Bulldog and Isle of Man

Championship titles
- 2009, 2010, 2012, 2017: British Rally Championship

Keith Cronin (born 18 July 1986) is an Irish rally driver and four-time winner of the British Rally Championship. He won the 2009 British Rally Championship in his first year in the series, defeating multiple champion Mark Higgins in his privately entered TTec Rally Prep Cronin Motorsport Mitsubishi Lancer Evolution IX. Cronin successfully defended his title in 2010 driving a Subaru Impreza. After missing the 2011 season, he returned to the Championship in 2012. He won three out of six events in his Citroen DS3 R3, meaning he won the overall title for the third time in his career. 2017 saw him crowned British Rally Champion for the fourth time.

In addition to competing in national events, in 2010, Cronin took part in two Intercontinental Rally Challenge events, driving a Proton Satria Neo S2000 for the Proton R3 Malaysia Rally Team.

In 2012, Cronin also competed in three rounds of the French Citroen Racing Trophy.

In 2013, Cronin won the Galway International Rally in a Subaru S11 WRC.

== Racing record ==
=== Complete WRC results ===
Year	Entrant	Car	1	2	3	4	5	6	7	8	9	10	11	12	13	Pos	Points
2013	Charles Hurst Citroën Belfast	Citroën DS3 R3T	MON	SWE	MEX	POR; 31	ARG	GRE	ITA; 17	FIN; 20	GER; 16	AUS	FRA; 15	ESP	GBR; 36	NC	0
