= Gwyndaf Evans =

Welsh rally driver (born 1959)

Personal information
- Nationality: (United Kingdom) British
- Full name: Gwyndaf Evans
- Born: 4 June 1959 (age 67); Dolgellau, Wales

World Rally Championship record
- Years active: 1987–2004, 2006–2008
- Co-driver: (United Kingdom) Howard Davies (United Kingdom) Chris Patterson (United Kingdom) Claire Mole (United Kingdom) Huw Lewis (United Kingdom) Gareth Roberts
- Teams: Ford, SEAT, MG, Mitsubishi
- Rallies: 32
- Championships: 0
- Rally wins: 0
- Podiums: 0
- Stage wins: 1
- Total points: 10
- First rally: 1987 RAC Rally
- Last rally: 2008 Wales Rally GB

Gwyndaf Evans (Welsh pronunciation: [ˈɡwɨ̞ndav ˈɛvans]; born 4 June 1959) is a Welsh former rally driver. He won the British Rally Championship in 1996, and was also the runner-up in 1995, 1998, 1999 and 2010. On the international stage his participation was limited, but he used his local knowledge to great success in the RAC Rally, where he won the Group N production car class twice driving a Ford Sierra RS Cosworth 4x4, in 1990 and Ford Escort RS Cosworth in 1993. In 1994, driving a Group A Ford Escort RS2000, he scored a then career high seventh place overall, winning his class once more, before going one better with a sixth place finish the following year, and his fourth class victory in six years.

In 1997, Evans switched to SEAT, who were competing with their Ibiza GTI 16v, and later the Córdoba WRC from 1999 to 2001. In 2002, he moved to MG and an MG ZR S1600, spending two years on the international circuit with Chris Patterson, and the British Championship with Claire Mole, after splitting with long-time co-driver Howard Davies.

Evans drove a Mitsubishi Lancer Evolution in the now renamed Wales Rally GB in 2004 and 2006, with the latter being where he won the 2006 Mitsubishi Evo Challenge Trophy. His prize was a works-prepared Lancer Evolution for the 2007 British Rally Championship.

Evans now runs the family Ford and Suzuki dealership in Dolgellau, first established by his grandfather in Dinas Mawddwy in 1930, and renamed to Gwyndaf Evans Motors in 1983. The company now supports Gwyndaf's son Elfyn, the 2026 World Rally Champion.

== World Rally Championship results ==
Year	Team/Entrant	Car	WRC Round																WDC	Points
Year	Team/Entrant	Car	1	2	3	4	5	6	7	8	9	10	11	12	13	14	15	16	WDC	Points
1987	Gwyndaf Evans	Ford Sierra RS Cosworth	MON	SWE	POR	KEN	FRA	GRE	USA	NZL	ARG	FIN	CIV	ITA	GBR; Ret				–	0
1988	Peacocks	Ford Sierra RS Cosworth	MON	SWE	POR	KEN	FRA	GRE	USA	NZL	ARG	FIN	CIV	ITA	GBR; Ret				–	0
1989	Brooklyn Motorsport	Ford Sierra RS Cosworth	SWE	MON	POR	KEN	FRA	GRE	NZL	ARG	FIN	AUS	CIV	ITA	GBR; 11				–	0
1990	Q8 Team Ford	Ford Sierra RS Cosworth 4X4	MON	POR	KEN	FRA	GRE	NZL	ARG	FIN; 23	AUS	ITA; 12	CIV	GBR; 11					–	0
1991	Q8 Team Ford	Ford Sierra RS Cosworth 4X4	MON	SWE; Ret	POR	KEN	FRA	GRC	NZL	ARG	FIN	AUS	ITA	CIV	ESP	GBR; Ret			–	0
1992	Gwyndaf Evans	Ford Sierra RS Cosworth 4X4	MON	SWE	POR	KEN	FRA	GRC	NZL	ARG	FIN	AUS	ITA	CIV	ESP	GBR; Ret			–	0
1993	Shell Helix Motor Oils	Ford Escort RS Cosworth	MON	SWE	POR	KEN	FRA	GRC	ARG	NZL	FIN	AUS	ITA	ESP	GBR; 11				–	0
1994	Gwyndaf Evans	Ford Escort RS Cosworth	MON	POR	KEN	FRA	GRC	ARG	NZL	FIN	ITA	GBR; 7							35th	4
1995	Ford Motorsport	Ford Escort RS Cosworth	MON	SWE	POR	FRA	NZL	AUS	ESP	GBR; 6									12th	6
1996	Ford Motor Co Ltd.	Ford Escort RS Cosworth	SWE	KEN	INA; Ret	GRC	ARG	FIN	AUS	ITA	GBR; Ret								–	0
1997	SEAT Cupra Sport	SEAT Ibiza Kit Car Evo2	MON	SWE	KEN	POR	ESP	FRA	ARG	GRC	NZL	FIN	INA	ITA	AUS	GBR; Ret			–	0
1998	SEAT Cupra Sport	SEAT Ibiza Kit Car Evo2	MON	SWE	KEN	POR	ESP	FRA	ARG	GRC	NZL	FIN; Ret	ITA	AUS; 20					–	0
1998	SEAT Cupra Sport	SEAT Córdoba WRC													GBR; Ret				–	0
1999	SEAT Cupra Sport	SEAT Ibiza Kit Car Evo2	MON	SWE	KEN	POR	ESP	FRA	ARG; Ret	GRC	NZL	FIN	CHN	ITA	AUS				–	0
1999	SEAT Cupra Sport	SEAT Córdoba WRC														GBR; Ret			–	0
2000	SEAT Cupra Sport	SEAT Córdoba WRC	MON	SWE	KEN	POR	ESP	ARG	GRC	NZL	FIN	CYP	FRA	ITA	AUS	GBR; Ret			–	0
2001	SEAT Cupra Sport	SEAT Córdoba WRC	MON	SWE	POR	ESP	ARG	CYP	GRC	KEN	FIN	NZL	ITA	FRA	AUS	GBR; Ret			–	0
2002	MG Sport & Racing	MG ZR S1600	MON; Ret	SWE	FRA	ESP; Ret	CYP	ARG	GRC; Ret	KEN	FIN	GER; Ret	ITA; 26	NZL	AUS	GBR; Ret			–	0
2003	MG Sport & Racing	MG ZR 160	MON	SWE	TUR	NZL	ARG	GRC	CYP	GER	FIN	AUS	ITA	FRA	ESP	GBR; 27			–	0
2004	Geoff Jones	Mitsubishi Lancer Evolution VII	MON	SWE	MEX	NZL	CYP	GRC	TUR	ARG	FIN	GER	JPN	GBR; 17	ITA	FRA	ESP	AUS	–	0
2006	Gwyndaf Evans	Mitsubishi Lancer Evolution IX	MON	SWE	MEX	ESP	FRA	ARG	ITA	GRC	GER	FIN	JPN	CYP	TUR	AUS	NZL	GBR; 65	–	0
2007	Mitsubishi Motors UK	Mitsubishi Lancer Evolution IX	MON	SWE	NOR	MEX	POR	ARG	ITA	GRC	FIN	GER	NZL	ESP	FRA	JPN	IRL	GBR; 40	–	0
2008	Mitsubishi Motors UK	Mitsubishi Lancer Evolution IX	MON	SWE	MEX	ARG	JOR	ITA	GRC	TUR	FIN	GER	NZL	ESP	FRA	JPN	GBR; 18		–	0

Awards and achievements
Preceded by Alister McRae	Autosport; National Rally Driver of the Year; 1996	Succeeded by Mark Higgins
