= 2021 Arctic Rally Finland =

57th edition of Arctic Rally

2021 Arctic Rally Finland Arctic Rally Finland Powered by CapitalBox 2021
Round 2 of 12 in the 2021 World Rally Championship
← Previous event	Next event →
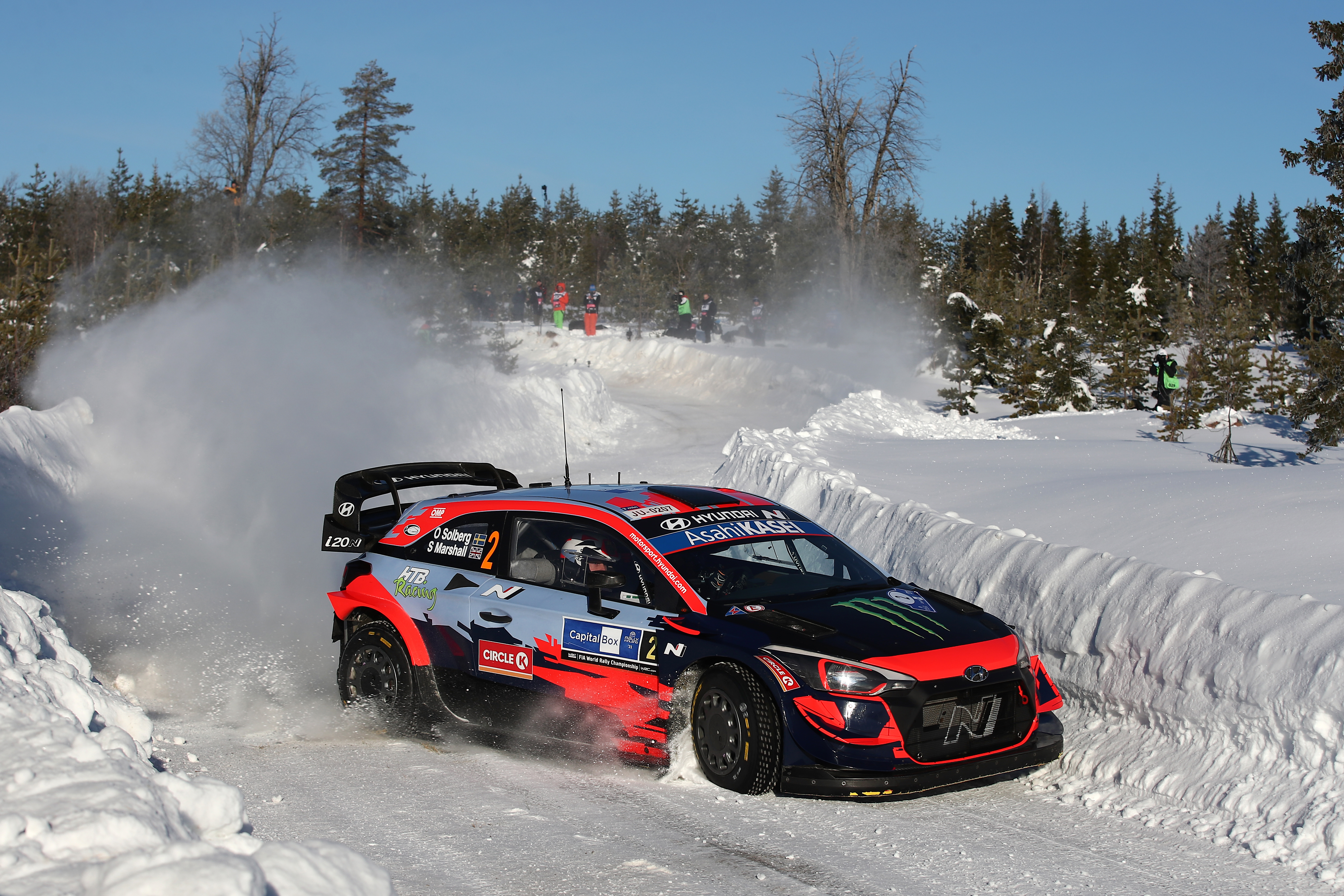
- The rally is the first World Rally Championship round held inside the Arctic Circle.
- Host country: Finland
- Rally base: Rovaniemi, Lapland
- Dates run: 26 – 28 February 2021
- Stages: 10 (251.08 km; 156.01 miles)
- Stage surface: Snow
- Transport distance: 604.97 km (375.91 miles)
- Overall distance: 856.05 km (531.92 miles)

Statistics
- Crews registered: 56
- Crews: 55 at start, 52 at finish

Overall results
- Overall winner: (Estonia) Ott Tänak (Estonia) Martin Järveoja (South Korea) Hyundai Shell Mobis WRT; 2:03:49.6
- Power Stage winner: (Finland) Kalle Rovanperä (Finland) Jonne Halttunen (Japan) Toyota Gazoo Racing WRT; 10:02.4

Support category results
- WRC-2 winner: (Finland) Esapekka Lappi (Finland) Janne Ferm (Italy) Movisport; 2:09:56.6
- WRC-3 winner: (Finland) Teemu Asunmaa (Finland) Marko Salminen; 2:11:55.3

The 2021 Arctic Rally Finland (also known as the Arctic Rally Finland Powered by CapitalBox 2021) was a motor racing event for rally cars that was held over three days between 26 and 28 February 2021. It marked the fifty-seventh running of the Arctic Rally, and the first time the event has been run as a round of the World Rally Championship. The event was the second round of the 2021 World Rally Championship, World Rally Championship-2 and World Rally Championship-3. The 2021 event was based in Rovaniemi in Lapland and was contested over ten special stages totalling 251.08 km (156.01 mi) in competitive distance.

Kalle Rovanperä and Jonne Halttunen were the defending rally winners, having won the 2020 rally when it was held as part of the Finnish Rally Championship.

Ott Tänak and Martin Järveoja won the event. Esapekka Lappi and Janne Ferm won the World Rally Championship-2 category, while Teemu Asunmaa and Marko Salminen were the winners in the World Rally Championship-3.

== Background ==
=== Addition on the calendar ===
The Arctic Rally was not included on the first calendar published by the World Motorsport Council. The event was a late addition when Rally Sweden was cancelled in response to the COVID-19 pandemic. The Arctic Rally was chosen over six other reserve events because Rally Sweden was the only snow-based event on the calendar, and none of the reserve events were planned to run on snow. Competitors are required to wear warmer overalls than usual for safety reasons.

The Arctic Rally was run twice in 2021. The first running in January was held as a round of the Finnish national rally Championship, while the second running in February was a World Championship round. The national-level event was won by Juho Hänninen, driving a Toyota Yaris WRC. The two events have the same organisers and similar routes.

=== Championship standings prior to the event ===
Reigning World Champions Sébastien Ogier and Julien Ingrassia entered the round with a nine-point lead over Elfyn Evans and Scott Martin. Thierry Neuville and Martijn Wydaeghe were third, a further four points behind. In the World Rally Championship for Manufacturers, Toyota Gazoo Racing WRT held a twenty-two-point lead over defending manufacturers' champions Hyundai Shell Mobis WRT, followed by M-Sport Ford WRT.

In the World Rally Championship-2 standings, Andreas Mikkelsen and Ola Fløene held an eight-point lead ahead of Adrien Fourmaux and Renaud Jamoul in the drivers' and co-drivers' standings respectively, with Eric Camilli and François-Xavier Buresi in third. In the teams' championship, Toksport WRT led Movisport by ten points.

In the World Rally Championship-3 standings, Yohan Rossel and Benoît Fulcrand led the drivers' and co-drivers' standings by six points respectively. Yoann Bonato and Benjamin Boulloud were second, with Nicolas Ciamin and Yannick Roche in third in both standings, trailing by two points.

=== Entry list ===
The following crews were entered into the rally. The event was open to crews competing in the World Rally Championship, its support categories, the World Rally Championship-2 and World Rally Championship-3, and privateer entries that were not registered to score points in any championship. Thirteen entries for the World Rally Championship were received, as were ten in the World Rally Championship-2 and twenty-three in the World Rally Championship-3.

Rally1 entries competing in the World Rally Championship
No.	Driver	Co-Driver	Entrant	Car	Tyre
1	(France) Sébastien Ogier	(France) Julien Ingrassia	(Japan) Toyota Gazoo Racing WRT	Toyota Yaris WRC	P
2	(Sweden) Oliver Solberg	(United Kingdom) Sebastian Marshall	(France) Hyundai 2C Competition	Hyundai i20 Coupe WRC	P
3	(Finland) Teemu Suninen	(Finland) Mikko Markkula	(United Kingdom) M-Sport Ford WRT	Ford Fiesta WRC	P
7	(France) Pierre-Louis Loubet	(France) Vincent Landais	(France) Hyundai 2C Competition	Hyundai i20 Coupe WRC	P
8	(Estonia) Ott Tänak	(Estonia) Martin Järveoja	(South Korea) Hyundai Shell Mobis WRT	Hyundai i20 Coupe WRC	P
11	(Belgium) Thierry Neuville	(Belgium) Martijn Wydaeghe	(South Korea) Hyundai Shell Mobis WRT	Hyundai i20 Coupe WRC	P
12	(Finland) Janne Tuohino	(Finland) Reeta Hämäläinen	(Finland) JanPro	Ford Fiesta WRC	P
18	(Japan) Takamoto Katsuta	(United Kingdom) Daniel Barritt	(Japan) Toyota Gazoo Racing WRT	Toyota Yaris WRC	P
33	(United Kingdom) Elfyn Evans	(United Kingdom) Scott Martin	(Japan) Toyota Gazoo Racing WRT	Toyota Yaris WRC	P
37	(Italy) Lorenzo Bertelli	(Italy) Simone Scattolin	(United Kingdom) M-Sport Ford WRT	Ford Fiesta WRC	P
42	(Republic of Ireland) Craig Breen	(Republic of Ireland) Paul Nagle	(South Korea) Hyundai Shell Mobis WRT	Hyundai i20 Coupe WRC	P
44	(United Kingdom) Gus Greensmith	(United Kingdom) Elliott Edmondson	(United Kingdom) M-Sport Ford WRT	Ford Fiesta WRC	P
69	(Finland) Kalle Rovanperä	(Finland) Jonne Halttunen	(Japan) Toyota Gazoo Racing WRT	Toyota Yaris WRC	P

Rally2 entries competing in the World Rally Championship-2
No.	Driver	Co-Driver	Entrant	Car	Tyre
20	(Norway) Andreas Mikkelsen	(Norway) Ola Fløene	(Germany) Toksport WRT	Škoda Fabia R5 Evo	P
21	(France) Adrien Fourmaux	(Belgium) Renaud Jamoul	(United Kingdom) M-Sport Ford WRT	Ford Fiesta R5 Mk. II	P
22	(Norway) Eyvind Brynildsen	(Norway) Veronica Engan	(Germany) Toksport WRT	Škoda Fabia R5 Evo	P
23	(United States) Sean Johnston	(United States) Alex Kihurani	(France) Saintéloc Junior Team	Citroën C3 Rally2	P
24	(Finland) Jari Huttunen	(Finland) Mikko Lukka	(South Korea) Hyundai Motorsport N	Hyundai i20 R5	P
25	(Finland) Esapekka Lappi	(Finland) Janne Ferm	(Italy) Movisport	Volkswagen Polo GTI R5	P
26	(Norway) Ole Christian Veiby	(Sweden) Jonas Andersson	(South Korea) Hyundai Motorsport N	Hyundai i20 R5	P
27	Nikolay Gryazin (Note: Nikolay Gryazin is Russian, but he competes as a neutral competitor using the designation RAF (Russian Automobile Federation), as the Court of Arbitration for Sport upheld a ban on Russia competing at World Championships. The ban was implemented by the World Anti-Doping Agency in response to state-sponsored doping program of Russian athletes.)	Konstantin Aleksandrov (Note: Konstantin Aleksandrov is Russian, but he competes as a neutral competitor using the designation RAF (Russian Automobile Federation), as the Court of Arbitration for Sport upheld a ban on Russia competing at World Championships. The ban was implemented by the World Anti-Doping Agency in response to state-sponsored doping program of Russian athletes.)	(Italy) Movisport	Volkswagen Polo GTI R5	P
28	(Estonia) Georg Linnamäe	(Ukraine) Volodymyr Korsia	(Estonia) ALM Motorsport	Volkswagen Polo GTI R5	P
29	(Czech Republic) Martin Prokop	(Czech Republic) Michal Ernst	(United Kingdom) M-Sport Ford WRT	Ford Fiesta R5 Mk. II	P

Rally2 entries competing in the World Rally Championship-3 (Note: Under the Sporting Regulations, each car competing in the World Rally Championship-3 is entered under the driver's name.)
No.	Driver	Co-Driver	Entrant	Car	Tyre
30	(Finland) Teemu Asunmaa	(Finland) Marko Salminen	(Finland) Teemu Asunmaa	Škoda Fabia R5 Evo	P
31	(Finland) Emil Lindholm	(Finland) Mikael Korhonen	(Finland) Emil Lindholm	Škoda Fabia R5 Evo	P
32	(Finland) Mikko Heikkilä	(Finland) Topi Luhtinen	(Finland) Mikko Heikkilä	Škoda Fabia R5 Evo	P
34	(Finland) Eerik Pietarinen	(Finland) Antti Linnaketo	(Finland) Eerik Pietarinen	Škoda Fabia R5 Evo	P
35	(Sweden) Johan Kristoffersson	(Sweden) Patrik Barth	(Sweden) Kristoffersson Motorsport	Volkswagen Polo GTI R5	P
36	(Sweden) Mattias Ekström	(Sweden) Emil Bergkvist	(Sweden) Mattias Ekström	Škoda Fabia R5 Evo	P
38	(Estonia) Egon Kaur	(Estonia) Silver Simm	(Estonia) Kaur Motorsport	Volkswagen Polo GTI R5	P
39	(Estonia) Gregor Jeets	(Estonia) Andrus Toom	(Estonia) Gregor Jeets	Škoda Fabia R5 Evo	P
40	(Finland) Ville Ruokanen	(Finland) Timo Pallari	(Finland) Ville Ruokanen	Škoda Fabia R5 Evo	P
41	(Finland) Pekka Keski-Korsu	(Finland) Markus Silfvast	(Finland) Pekka Keski-Korsu	Škoda Fabia R5	P
43	(Finland) Tuomas Skantz	(Finland) Kari Kallio	(Finland) Tuomas Skantz	Škoda Fabia R5	P
45	(Finland) Jussi Keskiniva	(Finland) Mikko Kaikkonen	(Finland) Jussi Keskiniva	Škoda Fabia R5	P
46	(Finland) Ari-Pekka Koivisto	(Finland) Jussi Kärpijoki	(Finland) Ari-Pekka Koivisto	Škoda Fabia R5	P
47	(Paraguay) Fabrizio Zaldívar	(Spain) Carlos del Barrio	(Paraguay) Fabrizio Zaldívar	Škoda Fabia R5 Evo	P
48	(Sweden) Lars Stugemo	(Sweden) Karl-Olof Lexe	(Sweden) Lars Stugemo	Škoda Fabia R5	P
49	(Saudi Arabia) Rakan Al-Rashed	(Portugal) Hugo Magalhães	(Saudi Arabia) Rakan Al-Rashed	Volkswagen Polo GTI R5	P
50	(Germany) Albert von Thurn und Taxis	(Austria) Bernhard Ettel	(Germany) Albert von Thurn und Taxis	Škoda Fabia R5 Evo	P
51	(Poland) Michał Sołowow	(Poland) Maciek Baran	(Poland) Michał Sołowow	Citroën C3 Rally2	P
52	(Lithuania) Vladas Jurkevičius	(Lithuania) Aisvydas Paliukėnas	(Lithuania) Vladas Jurkevičius	Škoda Fabia R5 Evo	P
53	(Finland) Marko Viitanen	(Finland) Tapio Suominen	(Finland) Marko Viitanen	Škoda Fabia R5	P
54	(Italy) Mauro Miele	(Italy) Luca Beltrame	(Italy) Mauro Miele	Škoda Fabia R5	P
55	(Spain) Miguel Díaz-Aboitiz	(Spain) Rodrigo Sanjuan	(Spain) Miguel Díaz-Aboitiz	Škoda Fabia R5 Evo	P
56	(Poland) Adrian Chwietczuk	(Poland) Jarosław Baran	(Poland) Adrian Chwietczuk	Škoda Fabia R5 Evo	P

==== In detail ====
Oliver Solberg is set to make his Rally1 début in a Hyundai i20 Coupe WRC prepared and entered by Hyundai's satellite team Hyundai 2C Competition at the rally. His co-driver for this rally is Sebastian Marshall as his regular co-driver Aaron Johnston has to miss the rally after he was found positive with COVID-19. FIA World Rallycross Championship driver Mattias Ekström will make a one-off appearance in the rally.

=== Route ===
The rally will be contested over ten special stages totalling 251.08 km (156.01 mi) in competitive distance. The route of the rally is different to that of the first running of the event in January 2021. All of the stages will be run in reverse, with the exception of the Aittajärvi Power Stage. The Mustalampi stage returned to the itinerary from previous runnings of the Arctic Rally, with some sections being brand-new.

==== Itinerary ====
All dates and times are EET (UTC+2).

Leg	Date	Time	No.	Stage name	Distance
—N/a	26 February	08:31	—	Vennivaara [Shakedown]	5.69 km
1	26 February	15:08	SS1	Sarriojärvi 1	31.05 km
1	26 February	18:38	SS2	Sarriojärvi 2	31.05 km
2	27 February	09:08	SS3	Mustalampi 1	24.43 km
2	27 February	10:38	SS4	Kaihuavaara 1	19.91 km
2	27 February	12:08	SS5	Siikakämä 1	27.68 km
2	27 February	15:38	SS6	Mustalampi 2	24.43 km
2	27 February	17:08	SS7	Kaihuavaara 2	19.91 km
2	27 February	18:38	SS8	Siikakämä 2	27.68 km
3	28 February	10:08	SS9	Aittajärvi 1	22.47 km
3	28 February	13:18	SS10	Aittajärvi 2 [Power Stage]	22.47 km

== Report ==
=== World Rally Cars ===
Ott Tänak and Martin Järveoja won the event for Hyundai. Kalle Rovanperä and Jonne Halttunen finished second for Toyota and took the lead in the championship. Ogier crashed on Saturday but was allowed to restart the next day. Solberg lost fifteen seconds to an off on the power stage, on which Rovanperä set the fastest time to claim the maximum bonus points, 0.2 seconds faster than Craig Breen and Paul Nagle.

==== Classification ====
Position		No.	Driver	Co-driver	Entrant	Car	Time	Difference	Points	
Event	Class	No.	Driver	Co-driver	Entrant	Car	Time	Difference	Event	Stage
1	1	8	Ott Tänak	Martin Järveoja	Hyundai Shell Mobis WRT	Hyundai i20 Coupe WRC	2:03:49.6	0.0	25	2
2	2	69	Kalle Rovanperä	Jonne Halttunen	Toyota Gazoo Racing WRT	Toyota Yaris WRC	2:04:07.1	+17.5	18	5
3	3	11	Thierry Neuville	Martijn Wydaeghe	Hyundai Shell Mobis WRT	Hyundai i20 Coupe WRC	2:04:09.4	+19.8	15	3
4	4	42	Craig Breen	Paul Nagle	Hyundai Shell Mobis WRT	Hyundai i20 Coupe WRC	2:04:42.2	+52.6	12	4
5	5	33	Elfyn Evans	Scott Martin	Toyota Gazoo Racing WRT	Toyota Yaris WRC	2:04:51.1	+1:01.5	10	0
6	6	18	Takamoto Katsuta	Daniel Barritt	Toyota Gazoo Racing WRT	Toyota Yaris WRC	2:05:27.4	+1:37.8	8	0
7	7	2	Oliver Solberg	Sebastian Marshall	Hyundai 2C Competition	Hyundai i20 Coupe WRC	2:05:28.6	+1:39.0	6	0
8	8	3	Teemu Suninen	Mikko Markkula	M-Sport Ford WRT	Ford Fiesta WRC	2:05:58.6	+2:09.0	4	0
9	9	44	Gus Greensmith	Elliott Edmondson	M-Sport Ford WRT	Ford Fiesta WRC	2:07:29.0	+3:39.4	2	0
20	10	1	Sébastien Ogier	Julien Ingrassia	Toyota Gazoo Racing WRT	Toyota Yaris WRC	2:14:55.8	+11:06.2	0	1
39	11	7	Pierre-Louis Loubet	Vincent Landais	Hyundai 2C Competition	Hyundai i20 Coupe WRC	3:14:50.1	+18:16.4	0	0
51	12	37	Lorenzo Bertelli	Simone Scattolin	M-Sport Ford WRT	Ford Fiesta WRC	3:06:43.5	+1:02:53.9	0	0
Retired SS9		12	Janne Tuohino	Reeta Hämäläinen	JanPro	Ford Fiesta WRC	Medical reasons		0	0

==== Special stages ====
Day	Stage	Stage name	Length	Winners	Car	Time	Class leaders
26 February	—	Vennivaara [Shakedown]	5.69 km	Tänak / Järveoja	Hyundai i20 Coupe WRC	2:35.4	—N/a
26 February	SS1	Sarriojärvi 1	31.05 km	Tänak / Järveoja	Hyundai i20 Coupe WRC	15:57.8	Tänak / Järveoja
26 February	SS2	Sarriojärvi 2	31.05 km	Tänak / Järveoja	Hyundai i20 Coupe WRC	15:52.9	Tänak / Järveoja
27 February	SS3	Mustalampi 1	24.43 km	Tänak / Järveoja	Hyundai i20 Coupe WRC	13:54.5	Tänak / Järveoja
27 February	SS4	Kaihuavaara 1	19.91 km	Evans / Martin	Toyota Yaris WRC	9:06.6	Tänak / Järveoja
27 February	SS5	Siikakämä 1	27.68 km	Tänak / Järveoja	Hyundai i20 Coupe WRC	12:30.1	Tänak / Järveoja
27 February	SS6	Mustalampi 2	24.43 km	Tänak / Järveoja	Hyundai i20 Coupe WRC	13:57.3	Tänak / Järveoja
27 February	SS7	Kaihuavaara 2	19.91 km	Rovanperä / Halttunen	Toyota Yaris WRC	9:08.8	Tänak / Järveoja
27 February	SS8	Siikakämä 2	27.68 km	Neuville / Wydaeghe	Hyundai i20 Coupe WRC	12:44.0	Tänak / Järveoja
28 February	SS9	Aittajärvi 1	22.47 km	Evans / Martin	Toyota Yaris WRC	10:07.5	Tänak / Järveoja
28 February	SS10	Aittajärvi 2 [Power Stage]	22.47 km	Rovanperä / Halttunen	Toyota Yaris WRC	10:02.4	Tänak / Järveoja

==== Championship standings ====
Pos.	Drivers' championships			Co-drivers' championships			Manufacturers' championships		
Pos.	Move	Driver	Points	Move	Co-driver	Points	Move	Manufacturer	Points
1	3	Kalle Rovanperä	39	3	Jonne Halttunen	39		Toyota Gazoo Racing WRT	88
2	1	Thierry Neuville	35	1	Martijn Wydaeghe	35		Hyundai Shell Mobis WRT	77
3	2	Sébastien Ogier	31	2	Julien Ingrassia	31		M-Sport Ford WRT	24
4	2	Elfyn Evans	31	2	Scott Martin	31		Hyundai 2C Competition	22
5	7	Ott Tänak	27	7	Martin Järveoja	27			

=== World Rally Championship-2 ===
==== Classification ====
Position		No.	Driver	Co-driver	Entrant	Car	Time	Difference	Points		
Event	Class	No.	Driver	Co-driver	Entrant	Car	Time	Difference	Class	Stage	Event
10	1	25	Esapekka Lappi	Janne Ferm	Movisport	Volkswagen Polo GTI R5	2:09:56.6	0.0	25	4	1
11	2	20	Andreas Mikkelsen	Ola Fløene	Toksport WRT	Škoda Fabia R5 Evo	2:10:44.3	+47.7	18	5	0
12	3	27	Nikolay Gryazin	Konstantin Aleksandrov	Movisport	Volkswagen Polo GTI R5	2:11:26.9	+1:30.3	15	2	0
15	4	22	Eyvind Brynildsen	Veronica Engan	Toksport WRT	Škoda Fabia R5 Evo	2:12:41.5	+2:44.9	12	0	0
16	5	26	Ole Christian Veiby	Jonas Andersson	Hyundai Motorsport N	Hyundai i20 R5	2:12:50.8	+2:54.2	10	3	0
21	6	29	Martin Prokop	Michal Ernst	M-Sport Ford WRT	Ford Fiesta R5 Mk. II	2:16:56.7	+7:00.1	8	0	0
30	7	23	Sean Johnston	Alex Kihurani	Saintéloc Junior Team	Citroën C3 Rally2	2:24:30.1	+14:33.5	6	0	0
37	8	28	Georg Linnamäe	Volodymyr Korsia	ALM Motorsport	Volkswagen Polo GTI R5	2:31:54.4	+21:57.8	4	0	0
48	9	21	Adrien Fourmaux	Renaud Jamoul	M-Sport Ford WRT	Ford Fiesta R5 Mk. II	2:47:17.8	+37:21.2	2	1	0
Retired SS1		24	Jari Huttunen	Mikko Lukka	Hyundai Motorsport N	Hyundai i20 R5	Engine		0	0	0

==== Special stages ====
Day	Stage	Stage name	Length	Winners	Car	Time	Class leaders
26 February	—	Vennivaara [Shakedown]	5.69 km	Mikkelsen / Fløene	Škoda Fabia R5 Evo	2:47.6	—N/a
26 February	SS1	Sarriojärvi 1	31.05 km	Lappi / Ferm	Volkswagen Polo GTI R5	16:40.6	Lappi / Ferm
26 February	SS2	Sarriojärvi 2	31.05 km	Lappi / Ferm	Volkswagen Polo GTI R5	16:38.3	Lappi / Ferm
27 February	SS3	Mustalampi 1	24.43 km	Lappi / Ferm	Volkswagen Polo GTI R5	14:29.7	Lappi / Ferm
27 February	SS4	Kaihuavaara 1	19.91 km	Lappi / Ferm	Volkswagen Polo GTI R5	9:36.2	Lappi / Ferm
27 February	SS5	Siikakämä 1	27.68 km	Lappi / Ferm	Volkswagen Polo GTI R5	13:09.4	Lappi / Ferm
27 February	SS6	Mustalampi 2	24.43 km	Lappi / Ferm	Volkswagen Polo GTI R5	14:26.9	Lappi / Ferm
27 February	SS7	Kaihuavaara 2	19.91 km	Lappi / Ferm	Volkswagen Polo GTI R5	9:34.0	Lappi / Ferm
27 February	SS8	Siikakämä 2	27.68 km	Gryazin / Aleksandrov	Volkswagen Polo GTI R5	13:40.8	Lappi / Ferm
28 February	SS9	Aittajärvi 1	22.47 km	Lappi / Ferm	Volkswagen Polo GTI R5	10:51.7	Lappi / Ferm
28 February	SS10	Aittajärvi 2 [Power Stage]	22.47 km	Mikkelsen / Fløene	Škoda Fabia R5 Evo	10:41.1	Lappi / Ferm

==== Championship standings ====
Pos.	Drivers' championships			Co-drivers' championships			Teams' championships		
Pos.	Move	Driver	Points	Move	Co-driver	Points	Move	Manufacturer	Points
1		Andreas Mikkelsen	52		Ola Fløene	52		Toksport WRT	70
2	New entry	Esapekka Lappi	29	New entry	Janne Ferm	29		Movisport	70
3	1	Adrien Fourmaux	25	1	Renaud Jamoul	25	New entry	M-Sport Ford WRT	18
4	1	Eric Camilli	17	1	François-Xavier Buresi	17			
5	New entry	Nikolay Gryazin	17	New entry	Konstantin Aleksandrov	17			

=== World Rally Championship-3 ===
==== Classification ====
Position		No.	Driver	Co-driver	Entrant	Car	Time	Difference	Points		
Event	Class	No.	Driver	Co-driver	Entrant	Car	Time	Difference	Class	Stage	Event
13	1	30	Teemu Asunmaa	Marko Salminen	Teemu Asunmaa	Škoda Fabia R5 Evo	2:11:55.3	0.0	25	3	0
14	2	38	Egon Kaur	Silver Simm	Kaur Motorsport	Volkswagen Polo GTI R5	2:11:59.5	+4.2	18	5	0
17	3	32	Mikko Heikkilä	Topi Luhtinen	Mikko Heikkilä	Škoda Fabia R5 Evo	2:13:33.9	+1:38.6	15	0	0
18	4	34	Eerik Pietarinen	Antti Linnaketo	Eerik Pietarinen	Škoda Fabia R5 Evo	2:13:40.6	+1:45.3	12	1	0
19	5	36	Mattias Ekström	Emil Bergkvist	Mattias Ekström	Škoda Fabia R5 Evo	2:14:29.2	+2:33.9	10	2	0
22	6	39	Gregor Jeets	Andrus Toom	Gregor Jeets	Škoda Fabia R5 Evo	2:18:12.8	+6:17.5	8	0	0
24	7	41	Pekka Keski-Korsu	Markus Silfvast	Pekka Keski-Korsu	Škoda Fabia R5	2:20:45.7	+8:50.4	6	0	0
25	8	43	Tuomas Skantz	Kari Kallio	Tuomas Skantz	Škoda Fabia R5	2:20:53.5	+8:58.2	4	0	0
26	9	51	Michał Sołowow	Maciek Baran	Michał Sołowow	Citroën C3 Rally2	2:20:54.3	+8:59.0	2	0	0
27	10	35	Johan Kristoffersson	Patrik Barth	Kristoffersson Motorsport	Volkswagen Polo GTI R5	2:22:24.6	+10:29.3	1	4	0
29	11	49	Rakan Al-Rashed	Hugo Magalhães	Rakan Al-Rashed	Volkswagen Polo GTI R5	2:23:37.8	+11:42.5	0	0	0
32	12	56	Adrian Chwietczuk	Jarosław Baran	Adrian Chwietczuk	Škoda Fabia R5 Evo	2:26:13.4	+14:18.1	0	0	0
33	13	47	Fabrizio Zaldívar	Carlos del Barrio	Fabrizio Zaldívar	Škoda Fabia R5 Evo	2:26:55.9	+15:00.6	0	0	0
34	14	45	Jussi Keskiniva	Mikko Kaikkonen	Jussi Keskiniva	Škoda Fabia R5	2:27:33.8	+15:38.5	0	0	0
35	15	53	Marko Viitanen	Tapio Suominen	Marko Viitanen	Škoda Fabia R5	2:28:00.4	+16:05.1	0	0	0
36	16	48	Lars Stugemo	Karl-Olof Lexe	Lars Stugemo	Škoda Fabia R5	2:28:21.3	+16:26.0	0	0	0
38	17	40	Ville Ruokanen	Timo Pallari	Ville Ruokanen	Škoda Fabia R5 Evo	2:32:37.2	+20:41.9	0	0	0
40	18	52	Vladas Jurkevičius	Aisvydas Paliukėnas	Vladas Jurkevičius	Škoda Fabia R5 Evo	2:34:46.8	+22:51.5	0	0	0
43	19	46	Ari-Pekka Koivisto	Jussi Kärpijoki	Ari-Pekka Koivisto	Škoda Fabia R5	2:37:35.8	+25:40.5	0	0	0
47	20	55	Miguel Díaz-Aboitiz	Rodrigo Sanjuan	Miguel Díaz-Aboitiz	Škoda Fabia R5 Evo	2:43:25.7	+31:30.4	0	0	0
49	21	54	Mauro Miele	Luca Beltrame	Mauro Miele	Škoda Fabia R5	2:51:47.4	+39:52.1	0	0	0
Retired SS10		50	Albert von Thurn und Taxis	Bernhard Ettel	Albert von Thurn und Taxis	Škoda Fabia R5 Evo	Personal		0	0	0
Retired SS4		31	Emil Lindholm	Mikael Korhonen	Emil Lindholm	Škoda Fabia R5 Evo	Accident		0	0	0

==== Special stages ====
Day	Stage	Stage name	Length	Winners	Car	Time	Class leaders
26 February	—	Vennivaara [Shakedown]	5.69 km	Kaur / Simm	Volkswagen Polo GTI R5	2:47.0	—N/a
26 February	SS1	Sarriojärvi 1	31.05 km	Lindholm / Korhonen	Škoda Fabia R5 Evo	16:50.4	Lindholm / Korhonen
26 February	SS2	Sarriojärvi 2	31.05 km	Lindholm / Korhonen	Škoda Fabia R5 Evo	16:48.5	Lindholm / Korhonen
27 February	SS3	Mustalampi 1	24.43 km	Kaur / Simm	Volkswagen Polo GTI R5	14:44.0	Lindholm / Korhonen
27 February	SS4	Kaihuavaara 1	19.91 km	Asunmaa / Salminen	Škoda Fabia R5 Evo	9:47.4	Asunmaa / Salminen
27 February	SS5	Siikakämä 1	27.68 km	Kaur / Simm	Volkswagen Polo GTI R5	13:17.5	Asunmaa / Salminen
27 February	SS6	Mustalampi 2	24.43 km	Asunmaa / Salminen	Škoda Fabia R5 Evo	14:38.6	Asunmaa / Salminen
27 February	SS7	Kaihuavaara 2	19.91 km	Asunmaa / Salminen	Škoda Fabia R5 Evo	9:51.3	Asunmaa / Salminen
27 February	SS8	Siikakämä 2	27.68 km	Kaur / Simm	Volkswagen Polo GTI R5	13:39.5	Asunmaa / Salminen
28 February	SS9	Aittajärvi 1	22.47 km	Kaur / Simm	Volkswagen Polo GTI R5	10:52.5	Asunmaa / Salminen
28 February	SS10	Aittajärvi 2 [Power Stage]	22.47 km	Kaur / Simm	Volkswagen Polo GTI R5	10:45.3	Asunmaa / Salminen

==== Championship standings ====
Pos.	Drivers' championships			Co-drivers' championships		
Pos.	Move	Driver	Points	Move	Co-driver	Points
1		Yohan Rossel	28		Benoît Fulcrand	28
2	New entry	Teemu Asunmaa	28	New entry	Marko Salminen	28
3	New entry	Egon Kaur	23	New entry	Silver Simm	23
4	2	Yoann Bonato	22	2	Benjamin Boulloud	22
5	2	Nicolas Ciamin	20	2	Yannick Roche	20

== Notes ==
Previous rally: 2021 Monte Carlo Rally	2021 FIA World Rally Championship	Next rally: 2021 Croatia Rally
Previous rally: n/a	2021 Arctic Rally Finland	Next rally: TBD
