= 2021 Rally Monza =

42nd edition of Rally Monza

2021 ACI Rally Monza: 42. FORUM8 ACI Rally Monza 2021
Round 12 of 12 in the 2021 World Rally Championship
← Previous event
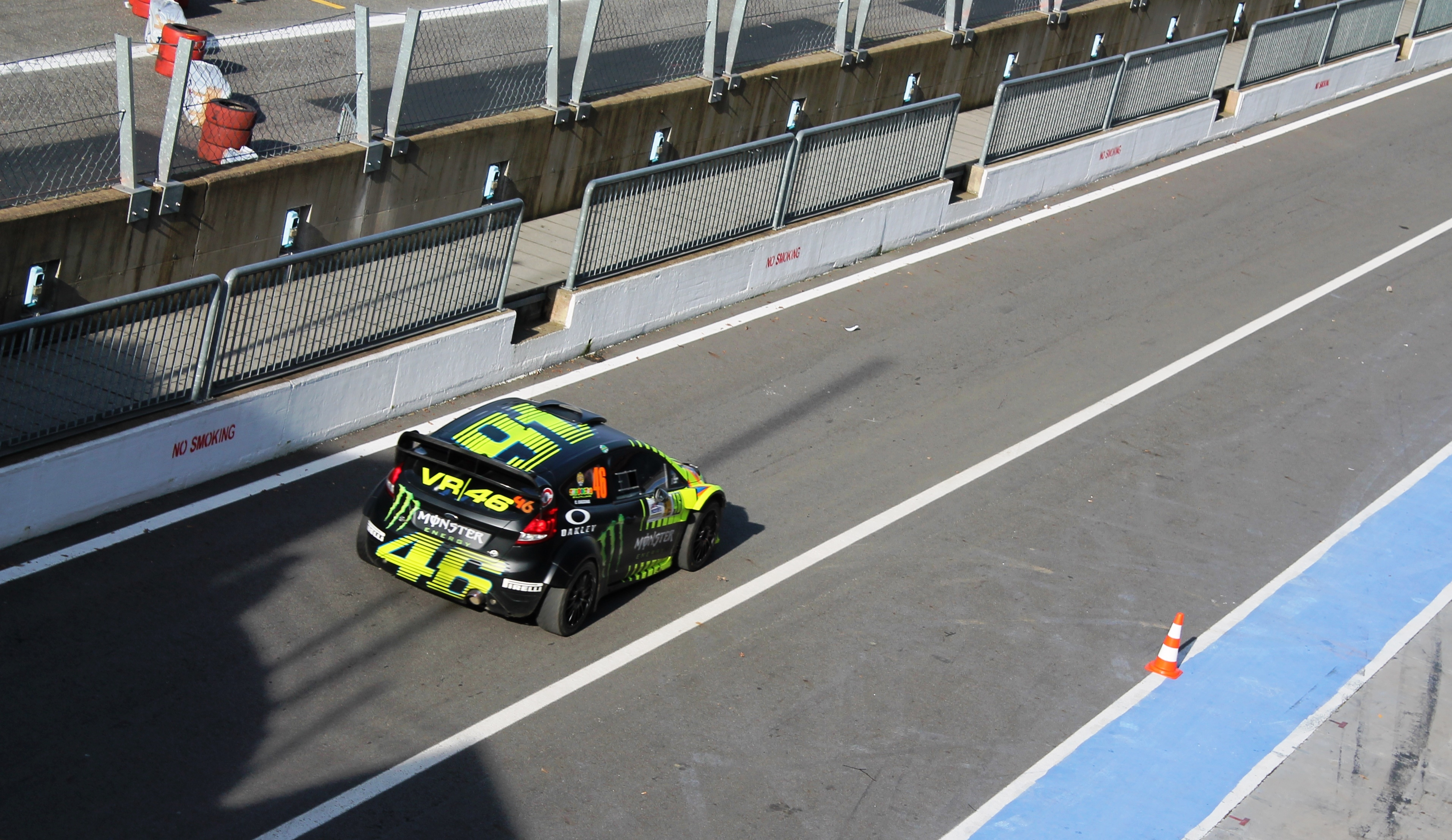
- Rally Monza replaced Rally Japan to hold the season finale for the second year in a row.
- Host country: Italy
- Rally base: Monza, Brianza
- Dates run: 18 – 21 November 2021
- Start location: Gerosa, Bergamo
- Finish location: Monza, Brianza
- Stages: 16 (253.18 km; 157.32 miles)
- Stage surface: Tarmac
- Transport distance: 425.76 km (264.55 miles)
- Overall distance: 677.62 km (421.05 miles)

Statistics
- Crews registered: 81
- Crews: 80 at start, 67 at finish

Overall results
- Overall winner: (France) Sébastien Ogier (France) Julien Ingrassia (Japan) Toyota Gazoo Racing WRT; 2:39:08.6
- Power Stage winner: (Belgium) Thierry Neuville (Belgium) Martijn Wydaeghe (South Korea) Hyundai Shell Mobis WRT; 10:04.4

Support category results
- WRC-2 winner: (Finland) Jari Huttunen (Finland) Mikko Lukka (United Kingdom) M-Sport Ford WRT; 2:49:28.6
- WRC-3 winner: (Italy) Andrea Crugnola (Italy) Pietro Ometto; 2:48:15.5

The 2021 Rally Monza (also known as FORUM8 ACI Rally Monza 2021) was a motor racing event for rally cars that held over four days between 18 and 21 November 2021. It marked the forty-second running of Monza Rally Show and was the twelfth and final round of the 2021 World Rally Championship, World Rally Championship-2, World Rally Championship-3. The event was based in the famous Autodromo Nazionale di Monza circuit near Milan, where the Italian Grand Prix was held. The rally covered a total competitive distance of 253.18 km (157.32 mi).

Sébastien Ogier and Julien Ingrassia were the defending rally winners. Their team, Toyota Gazoo Racing WRT, were the defending manufacturers' winners. Mads Østberg and Torstein Eriksen were the defending winners in the WRC-2 category. Andreas Mikkelsen and Anders Jæger-Amland weer the defending winners in the WRC-3 category, but they did not defend their title as Mikkelsen was competing in the WRC-2 category for Toksport WRT.

Ogier and Ingrassia successfully defended their titles. Their team, Toyota Gazoo Racing WRT, successfully defended their titles. The result saw them confirm the world titles. In the World Rally Championship-2 category, Jari Huttunen and Mikko Lukka won the event, while Torstein Eriksen confirmed to win the WRC-2 co-driver title. In the World Rally Championship-3 category, Andrea Crugnola and Pietro Ometto won the rally. Meanwhile, Yohan Rossel and Maciej Szczepaniak took the driver's and co-driver's title in the class respectively.

== Background ==
=== Championship standings prior to the event ===
Reigning World Champions Sébastien Ogier and Julien Ingrassia entered the round with a seventeen-point lead over Elfyn Evans and Scott Martin. Thierry Neuville and Martijn Wydaeghe were third, a further twenty-eight points behind. In the World Rally Championship for Manufacturers, Toyota Gazoo Racing WRT held a massive forty-seven-point lead over defending manufacturers' champions Hyundai Shell Mobis WRT, followed by M-Sport Ford WRT.

In the World Rally Championship-2 standings, newly-crowned champion Andreas Mikkelsen led Mads Østberg in the drivers' championship, with Marco Bulacia Wilkinson in third. In the co-drivers' championship Torstein Eriksen held a twenty-two-point lead over Marcelo Der Ohannesian, with Ola Fløene in third.

In the World Rally Championship-3 standings, Yohan Rossel led Kajetan Kajetanowicz by twelve points in the drivers' championship, with Emil Lindholm in third. In the co-drivers' championship, newly-crowned champion Maciek Szczepaniak held a thirteen-six-point lead over Alexandre Coria, with Ross Whittock in third.

=== Entry list ===
The following crews entered the rally. The event opened to crews competing in the World Rally Championship, its support categories, the World Rally Championship-2 and World Rally Championship-3, and privateer entries that were not registered to score points in any championship. Ten entries for the World Rally Championship were received, as were four in the World Rally Championship-2 and twenty-one in the World Rally Championship-3.

Rally1 entries competing in the World Rally Championship
No.	Driver	Co-Driver	Entrant	Car	Tyre
1	(France) Sébastien Ogier	(France) Julien Ingrassia	(Japan) Toyota Gazoo Racing WRT	Toyota Yaris WRC	P
2	(Sweden) Oliver Solberg	(United Kingdom) Elliott Edmondson	(France) Hyundai 2C Competition	Hyundai i20 Coupe WRC	P
3	(Finland) Teemu Suninen	(Finland) Mikko Markkula	(South Korea) Hyundai Shell Mobis WRT	Hyundai i20 Coupe WRC	P
6	(Spain) Dani Sordo	(Spain) Cándido Carrera	(South Korea) Hyundai Shell Mobis WRT	Hyundai i20 Coupe WRC	P
11	(Belgium) Thierry Neuville	(Belgium) Martijn Wydaeghe	(South Korea) Hyundai Shell Mobis WRT	Hyundai i20 Coupe WRC	P
16	(France) Adrien Fourmaux	(France) Alexandre Coria	(United Kingdom) M-Sport Ford WRT	Ford Fiesta WRC	P
18	(Japan) Takamoto Katsuta	(Republic of Ireland) Aaron Johnston	(Japan) Toyota Gazoo Racing WRT	Toyota Yaris WRC	P
33	(United Kingdom) Elfyn Evans	(United Kingdom) Scott Martin	(Japan) Toyota Gazoo Racing WRT	Toyota Yaris WRC	P
44	(United Kingdom) Gus Greensmith	(Sweden) Jonas Andersson	(United Kingdom) M-Sport Ford WRT	Ford Fiesta WRC	P
69	(Finland) Kalle Rovanperä	(Finland) Jonne Halttunen	(Japan) Toyota Gazoo Racing WRT	Toyota Yaris WRC	P

Rally2 entries competing in the World Rally Championship-2
No.	Driver	Co-Driver	Entrant	Car	Tyre
20	(Norway) Andreas Mikkelsen	(United Kingdom) Phil Hall	(Germany) Toksport WRT	Škoda Fabia Rally2 evo	P
21	(Bolivia) Marco Bulacia Wilkinson	(Argentina) Marcelo Der Ohannesian	(Germany) Toksport WRT	Škoda Fabia Rally2 evo	P
22	(Finland) Jari Huttunen	(Finland) Mikko Lukka	(United Kingdom) M-Sport Ford WRT	Ford Fiesta Rally2	P
25	(Italy) Enrico Brazzoli	(Italy) Maurizio Barone	(Italy) Movisport	Škoda Fabia Rally2 evo	P

Rally2 entries competing in the World Rally Championship-3 (Note: Under the Sporting Regulations, each car competing in the World Rally Championship-3 is entered under the driver's name.)
No.	Driver	Co-Driver	Entrant	Car	Tyre
26	(Poland) Kajetan Kajetanowicz	(Poland) Maciej Szczepaniak	(Poland) Kajetan Kajetanowicz	Škoda Fabia Rally2 evo	P
27	(France) Yohan Rossel	(France) Jacques-Julien Renucci	(France) Yohan Rossel	Citroën C3 Rally2	P
28	(United Kingdom) Chris Ingram	(United Kingdom) Ross Whittock	(United Kingdom) Chris Ingram	Škoda Fabia Rally2 evo	P
29	(Republic of Ireland) Josh McErlean	(Republic of Ireland) James Fulton	(Republic of Ireland) Josh McErlean	Hyundai i20 N Rally2	P
30	(Italy) Mauro Miele	(Italy) Luca Beltrame	(Italy) Mauro Miele	Škoda Fabia Rally2 evo	P
31	(Luxembourg) Grégoire Munster	(Belgium) Louis Louka	(Luxembourg) Grégoire Munster	Hyundai i20 N Rally2	P
32	(Italy) Giacomo Ogliari	(Italy) Giacomo Ciucci	(Italy) Giacomo Ogliari	Citroën C3 Rally2	P
34	(Italy) Pablo Biolghini	(Switzerland) Marco Menchini	(Italy) Pablo Biolghini	Škoda Fabia Rally2 evo	P
35	(Italy) Andrea Crugnola	(Italy) Pietro Ometto	(Italy) Andrea Crugnola	Hyundai i20 N Rally2	P
36	(Italy) Stefano Albertini	(Italy) Danilo Fappani	(Italy) Stefano Albertini	Hyundai i20 N Rally2	P
37	(Italy) Damiano De Tommaso	(Italy) Giorgia Ascalone	(Italy) Damiano De Tommaso	Škoda Fabia Rally2 evo	P
38	(Italy) Alessandro Perico	(Italy) Mauro Turati	(Italy) Alessandro Perico	Škoda Fabia Rally2 evo	P
39	(Italy) Alberto Dall'Era	(Italy) Edoardo Brovelli	(Italy) Alberto Dall'Era	Volkswagen Polo GTI R5	P
40	(Italy) Marco Paccagnella	(Italy) Mattia Orio	(Italy) Marco Paccagnella	Škoda Fabia Rally2 evo	P
41	(United Kingdom) Frank Bird	(United Kingdom) Jack Morton	(United Kingdom) Frank Bird	Ford Fiesta Rally2	P
42	(Italy) Marco Roncoroni	(Italy) Paolo Brusadelli	(Italy) Marco Roncoroni	Škoda Fabia R5	P
43	(Italy) Lorenzo Bontempelli	(Italy) Gianluca Marchioni	(Italy) Lorenzo Bontempelli	Škoda Fabia Rally2 evo	P
46	(Italy) Rachele Somaschini	(Italy) Nicola Arena	(Italy) Rachele Somaschini	Citroën C3 Rally2	P
47	(Italy) Jacopo Civelli	(Italy) Massimo Moriconi	(Italy) Jacopo Civelli	Škoda Fabia R5	P
48	(Italy) Patrizia Perosino	(Italy) Veronica Verzoletto	(Italy) Patrizia Perosino	Škoda Fabia R5	P
49	(Italy) Giancarlo Terzi	(Italy) Samuele Perino	(Italy) Giancarlo Terzi	Škoda Fabia R5	P

Other major entries
No.	Driver	Co-Driver	Entrant	Car	Tyre
23	Nikolay Gryazin (Note: Nikolay Gryazin is Russian, but he competes as a neutral competitor using the designation RAF (Russian Automobile Federation), as the Court of Arbitration for Sport upheld a ban on Russia competing at World Championships. The ban was implemented by the World Anti-Doping Agency in response to state-sponsored doping program of Russian athletes.)	Konstantin Aleksandrov (Note: Konstantin Aleksandrov is Russian, but he competes as a neutral competitor using the designation RAF (Russian Automobile Federation), as the Court of Arbitration for Sport upheld a ban on Russia competing at World Championships. The ban was implemented by the World Anti-Doping Agency in response to state-sponsored doping program of Russian athletes.)	(Italy) Movisport (Note: Gryazin and Aleksandrov are competing for teams' championship points in the WRC-2.)	Škoda Fabia Rally2 evo	P
24	(Estonia) Georg Linnamäe	(United Kingdom) James Morgan	(Estonia) ALM Motorsport (Note: Linnamäe and Morgan are competing for co-drivers' championship points in the WRC-2.)	Volkswagen Polo GTI R5	P
45	(France) Stéphane Lefebvre	(France) Gilles de Turckheim	(France) Gilles de Turckheim	Citroën C3 Rally2	P

=== Route ===
The first and second leg of action are set to take place both in stages inside the Autodromo Nazionale di Monza and in public stages north of Bergamo in the foothills of the Alps, while the third leg, including the Power Stage, will take place solely inside the circuit.

==== Itinerary ====
All dates and times are CEST (UTC+2).

Date	Time	No.	Stage name	Distance
18 November	18:01	—	Monza Circuit PZero [Shakedown]	4.09 km
19 November	7:31	SS1	Gerosa 1	10.96 km
19 November	8:16	SS2	Costa Valle Imagna 1	22.11 km
19 November	10:20	SS3	Gerosa 2	10.96 km
19 November	11:08	SS4	Costa Valle Imagna 2	22.11 km
19 November	13:38	SS5	Cinturato 1	14.49 km
19 November	15:48	SS6	Cinturato 2	14.49 km
19 November	18:20	SS7	Grand Prix 1	10.29 km
20 November	7:38	SS8	San Fermo 1	14.80 km
20 November	8:33	SS9	Selvino 1	24.93 km
20 November	11:08	SS10	San Fermo 2	14.80 km
20 November	12:03	SS11	Selvino 2	24.93 km
20 November	14:51	SS12	Sottozero 1	14.39 km
20 November	17:19	SS13	Sottozero 2	14.39 km
21 November	7:48	SS14	Grand Prix 2	10.29 km
21 November	10:08	SS15	Serraglio 1	14.62 km
21 November	12:18	SS16	Serraglio 2 [Power Stage]	14.62 km

== Report ==
=== World Rally Cars ===
==== Classification ====
Position		No.	Driver	Co-driver	Entrant	Car	Time	Difference	Points	
Event	Class	No.	Driver	Co-driver	Entrant	Car	Time	Difference	Event	Stage
1	1	1	Sébastien Ogier	Julien Ingrassia	Toyota Gazoo Racing WRT	Toyota Yaris WRC	2:39:08.6	0.0	25	1
2	2	33	Elfyn Evans	Scott Martin	Toyota Gazoo Racing WRT	Toyota Yaris WRC	2:39:15.9	+7.3	18	2
3	3	6	Dani Sordo	Cándido Carrera	Hyundai Shell Mobis WRT	Hyundai i20 Coupe WRC	2:39:29.9	+21.3	15	3
4	4	11	Thierry Neuville	Martijn Wydaeghe	Hyundai Shell Mobis WRT	Hyundai i20 Coupe WRC	2:39:40.6	+32.0	12	5
5	5	2	Oliver Solberg	Elliott Edmondson	Hyundai Motorsport N	Hyundai i20 Coupe WRC	2:40:40.6	+1:32.0	10	0
6	6	3	Teemu Suninen	Mikko Markkula	Hyundai Shell Mobis WRT	Hyundai i20 Coupe WRC	2:41:31.2	+2:22.6	8	0
7	7	18	Takamoto Katsuta	Aaron Johnston	Toyota Gazoo Racing WRT	Toyota Yaris WRC	2:41:43.1	+2:34.5	6	4
8	8	44	Gus Greensmith	Chris Patterson	M-Sport Ford WRT	Ford Fiesta WRC	2:41:58.8	+2:50.2	4	0
9	9	69	Kalle Rovanperä	Jonne Halttunen	Toyota Gazoo Racing WRT	Toyota Yaris WRC	2:43:58.2	+4:49.6	2	0
55	10	16	Adrien Fourmaux	Alexandre Coria	M-Sport Ford WRT	Ford Fiesta WRC	3:30:41.5	+51:32.9	0	0

==== Special stages ====
Day	Stage	Stage name	Length	Winners	Car	Time	Class leaders
18 November	—	Monza Circuit PZero [Shakedown]	4.09 km	Rovanperä / Halttunen	Toyota Yaris WRC	2:55.1	—N/a
19 November	SS1	Gerosa 1	10.96 km	Ogier / Ingrassia	Toyota Yaris WRC	6:42.8	Ogier / Ingrassia
19 November	SS2	Costa Valle Imagna 1	22.11 km	Evans / Martin	Toyota Yaris WRC	12:59.0	Ogier / Ingrassia
19 November	SS3	Gerosa 2	10.96 km	Ogier / Ingrassia	Toyota Yaris WRC	6:35.3	Ogier / Ingrassia
19 November	SS4	Costa Valle Imagna 2	22.11 km	Ogier / Ingrassia	Toyota Yaris WRC	12:48.0	Ogier / Ingrassia
19 November	SS5	Cinturato 1	14.49 km	Evans / Martin	Toyota Yaris WRC	9:51.0	Ogier / Ingrassia
19 November	SS6	Cinturato 2	14.49 km	Neuville / Wydaeghe	Hyundai i20 Coupe WRC	9:39.8	Evans / Martin
19 November	SS7	Grand Prix 1	10.29 km	Sordo / Carrera	Hyundai i20 Coupe WRC	5:18.7	Evans / Martin
20 November	SS8	San Fermo 1	14.80 km	Neuville / Wydaeghe	Hyundai i20 Coupe WRC	9:15.4	Ogier / Ingrassia
20 November	SS9	Selvino 1	24.93 km	Evans / Martin	Toyota Yaris WRC	16:12.3	Evans / Martin
20 November	SS10	San Fermo 2	14.80 km	Ogier / Ingrassia	Toyota Yaris WRC	9:11.1	Ogier / Ingrassia
20 November	SS11	Selvino 2	24.93 km	Ogier / Ingrassia	Toyota Yaris WRC	16:07.6	Ogier / Ingrassia
20 November	SS12	Sottozero 1	14.39 km	Evans / Martin	Toyota Yaris WRC	9:10.9	Evans / Martin
20 November	SS13	Sottozero 2	14.39 km	Sordo / Carrera	Hyundai i20 Coupe WRC	9:10.7	Ogier / Ingrassia
21 November	SS14	Grand Prix 2	10.29 km	Neuville / Wydaeghe	Hyundai i20 Coupe WRC	5:12.3	Ogier / Ingrassia
21 November	SS15	Serraglio 1	14.62 km	Neuville / Wydaeghe	Hyundai i20 Coupe WRC	10:10.1	Ogier / Ingrassia
21 November	SS16	Serraglio 2 [Power Stage]	14.62 km	Neuville / Wydaeghe	Hyundai i20 Coupe WRC	10:04.4	Ogier / Ingrassia

==== Championship standings ====
- **Bold text** indicates 2021 World Champions.

Pos.	Drivers' championships			Co-drivers' championships			Manufacturers' championships		
Pos.	Move	Driver	Points	Move	Co-driver	Points	Move	Manufacturer	Points
1		**Sébastien Ogier**	230		**Julien Ingrassia**	230		**Toyota Gazoo Racing WRT**	520
2		Elfyn Evans	207		Scott Martin	207		Hyundai Shell Mobis WRT	462
3		Thierry Neuville	176		Martijn Wydaeghe	176		M-Sport Ford WRT	199
4		Kalle Rovanperä	142		Jonne Halttunen	142		Hyundai 2C Competition	68
5		Ott Tänak	128		Martin Järveoja	128			

=== World Rally Championship-2 ===
==== Classification ====
Position		No.	Driver	Co-driver	Entrant	Car	Time	Difference	Points		
Event	Class	No.	Driver	Co-driver	Entrant	Car	Time	Difference	Class	Stage	Event
14	1	22	Jari Huttunen	Mikko Lukka	M-Sport Ford WRT	Ford Fiesta Rally2	2:49:28.6	0.0	**25**	**4**	**0**
16	2	20	Andreas Mikkelsen	Phil Hall	Toksport WRT	Škoda Fabia Rally2 evo	2:50:15.6	+47.0	**18**	**5**	**0**
35	3	25	Enrico Brazzoli	Maurizio Barone	Movisport	Škoda Fabia Rally2 evo	3:03:29.4	+14:00.8	**15**	**2**	**0**
58	4	21	Marco Bulacia Wilkinson	Marcelo Der Ohannesian	Toksport WRT	Škoda Fabia Rally2 evo	3:48:50.9	+59:22.3	**12**	**3**	**0**

==== Special stages ====
Day	Stage	Stage name	Length	Winners	Car	Time	Class leaders
18 November	—	Monza Circuit PZero [Shakedown]	4.09 km	Mikkelsen / Hall	Škoda Fabia Rally2 evo	3:03.3	—N/a
19 November	SS1	Gerosa 1	10.96 km	Mikkelsen / Hall	Škoda Fabia Rally2 evo	7:12.3	Mikkelsen / Hall
19 November	SS2	Costa Valle Imagna 1	22.11 km	Mikkelsen / Hall	Škoda Fabia Rally2 evo	14:01.3	Mikkelsen / Hall
19 November	SS3	Gerosa 2	10.96 km	Mikkelsen / Hall	Škoda Fabia Rally2 evo	7:03.7	Mikkelsen / Hall
19 November	SS4	Costa Valle Imagna 2	22.11 km	Stage cancelled			
19 November	SS5	Cinturato 1	14.49 km	Mikkelsen / Hall	Škoda Fabia Rally2 evo	10:12.1	Mikkelsen / Hall
19 November	SS6	Cinturato 2	14.49 km	Huttunen / Lukka	Ford Fiesta Rally2	10:15.0	Bulacia Wilkinson / Der Ohannesian
19 November	SS7	Grand Prix 1	10.29 km	Mikkelsen / Hall	Škoda Fabia Rally2 evo	5:38.7	Bulacia Wilkinson / Der Ohannesian
20 November	SS8	San Fermo 1	14.80 km	Mikkelsen / Hall	Škoda Fabia Rally2 evo	9:49.6	Huttunen / Lukka
20 November	SS9	Selvino 1	24.93 km	Mikkelsen / Hall	Škoda Fabia Rally2 evo	17:17.3	Huttunen / Lukka
20 November	SS10	San Fermo 2	14.80 km	Mikkelsen / Hall	Škoda Fabia Rally2 evo	9:45.2	Huttunen / Lukka
20 November	SS11	Selvino 2	24.93 km	Huttunen / Lukka	Ford Fiesta Rally2	17:15.1	Huttunen / Lukka
20 November	SS12	Sottozero 1	14.39 km	Mikkelsen / Hall	Škoda Fabia Rally2 evo	9:36.0	Huttunen / Lukka
20 November	SS13	Sottozero 2	14.39 km	Mikkelsen / Hall	Škoda Fabia Rally2 evo	9:36.1	Huttunen / Lukka
21 November	SS14	Grand Prix 2	10.29 km	Mikkelsen / Hall	Škoda Fabia Rally2 evo	5:30.8	Huttunen / Lukka
21 November	SS15	Serraglio 1	14.62 km	Mikkelsen / Hall	Škoda Fabia Rally2 evo	10:33.6	Huttunen / Lukka
21 November	SS16	Serraglio 2 [Power Stage]	14.62 km	Mikkelsen / Hall	Škoda Fabia Rally2 evo	10:29.9	Huttunen / Lukka

==== Championship standings ====
- **Bold text** indicates 2021 World Champions.

Pos.	Drivers' championships			Co-drivers' championships			Teams' championships		
Pos.	Move	Driver	Points	Move	Co-driver	Points	Move	Manufacturer	Points
1		**Andreas Mikkelsen**	149		**Torstein Eriksen**	126	1	**Movisport**	227
2		Mads Østberg	126	3	Mikko Lukka	107	1	Toksport WRT	216
3	2	Jari Huttunen	107	1	Marcelo Der Ohannesian	105		M-Sport Ford WRT	146
4	1	Marco Bulacia Wilkinson	107	1	Ola Fløene	98		Hyundai Motorsport N	73
5	1	Teemu Suninen	93	1	Mikko Markkula	93		Saintéloc Junior Team	27

=== World Rally Championship-3 ===
==== Classification ====
Position		No.	Driver	Co-driver	Entrant	Car	Time	Difference	Points		
Event	Class	No.	Driver	Co-driver	Entrant	Car	Time	Difference	Class	Stage	Event
10	1	35	Andrea Crugnola	Pietro Ometto	Andrea Crugnola	Hyundai i20 N Rally2	2:48:15.5	0.0	25	4	1
11	2	27	Yohan Rossel	Jacques-Julien Renucci	Yohan Rossel	Citroën C3 Rally2	2:48:19.5	+4.0	18	5	0
12	3	26	Kajetan Kajetanowicz	Maciej Szczepaniak	Kajetan Kajetanowicz	Škoda Fabia Rally2 evo	2:48:22.6	+7.1	15	3	0
15	4	31	Grégoire Munster	Louis Louka	Grégoire Munster	Hyundai i20 N Rally2	2:49:47.0	+1:31.5	12	0	0
17	5	37	Damiano De Tommaso	Giorgia Ascalone	Damiano De Tommaso	Škoda Fabia Rally2 evo	2:50:26.9	+2:11.4	10	0	0
19	6	29	Josh McErlean	James Fulton	Josh McErlean	Hyundai i20 N Rally2	2:50:56.0	+2:40.5	8	1	0
21	7	38	Alessandro Perico	Mauro Turati	Alessandro Perico	Škoda Fabia Rally2 evo	2:53:24.5	+5:09.0	6	0	0
24	8	28	Chris Ingram	Ross Whittock	Chris Ingram	Škoda Fabia Rally2 evo	2:56:44.6	+8:29.1	4	2	0
25	9	39	Alberto Dall'Era	Edoardo Brovelli	Alberto Dall'Era	Volkswagen Polo GTI R5	2:56:55.9	+8:40.4	2	0	0
27	10	42	Marco Roncoroni	Paolo Brusadelli	Marco Roncoroni	Škoda Fabia R5	2:57:17.0	+9:01.5	1	0	0
28	11	30	Mauro Miele	Luca Beltrame	Mauro Miele	Škoda Fabia Rally2 evo	2:58:07.8	+9:52.3	0	0	0
30	12	43	Lorenzo Bontempelli	Gianluca Marchioni	Lorenzo Bontempelli	Škoda Fabia Rally2 evo	2:59:12.0	+10:56.5	0	0	0
32	13	46	Rachele Somaschini	Nicola Arena	Rachele Somaschini	Citroën C3 Rally2	3:02:27.7	+14:12.2	0	0	0
33	14	32	Giacomo Ogliari	Giacomo Ciucci	Giacomo Ogliari	Citroën C3 Rally2	3:03:19.2	+15:03.7	0	0	0
34	15	34	Pablo Biolghini	Marco Menchini	Pablo Biolghini	Škoda Fabia Rally2 evo	3:03:23.5	+15:08.0	0	0	0
39	16	49	Giancarlo Terzi	Samuele Perino	Giancarlo Terzi	Škoda Fabia R5	3:06:52.9	+18:37.4	0	0	0
52	17	48	Patrizia Perosino	Veronica Verzoletto	Patrizia Perosino	Škoda Fabia R5	3:20:24.1	+32:08.6	0	0	0
61	18	47	Jacopo Civelli	Massimo Moriconi	Jacopo Civelli	Škoda Fabia R5	3:57:06.6	+1:08:51.1	0	0	0
Retired SS16		40	Marco Paccagnella	Mattia Orio	Marco Paccagnella	Škoda Fabia Rally2 evo	Withdrawn		0	0	0
Retired SS13		41	Frank Bird	Jack Morton	Frank Bird	Ford Fiesta Rally2	Mechanical		0	0	0
Retired SS11		36	Stefano Albertini	Danilo Fappani	Stefano Albertini	Hyundai i20 N Rally2	Crash		0	0	0
Retired SS8		47	Jacopo Civelli	Massimo Moriconi	Jacopo Civelli	Škoda Fabia R5	Withdrawn		0	0	0

==== Special stages ====
Day	Stage	Stage name	Length	Winners	Car	Time	Class leaders
18 November	—	Monza Circuit PZero [Shakedown]	4.09 km	Crugnola / Ometto	Hyundai i20 N Rally2	3:00.9	—N/a
19 November	SS1	Gerosa 1	10.96 km	Rossel / Renucci	Citroën C3 Rally2	7:12.6	Rossel / Renucci
19 November	SS2	Costa Valle Imagna 1	22.11 km	Kajetanowicz / Szczepaniak	Škoda Fabia Rally2 evo	14:02.1	Rossel / Renucci
19 November	SS3	Gerosa 2	10.96 km	Crugnola / Ometto	Hyundai i20 N Rally2	7:02.6	Rossel / Renucci
19 November	SS4	Costa Valle Imagna 2	22.11 km	Stage cancelled			
19 November	SS5	Cinturato 1	14.49 km	Rossel / Renucci	Citroën C3 Rally2	10:18.5	Rossel / Renucci
19 November	SS6	Cinturato 2	14.49 km	Crugnola / Ometto	Hyundai i20 N Rally2	10:11.5	Rossel / Renucci
19 November	SS7	Grand Prix 1	10.29 km	Crugnola / Ometto	Hyundai i20 N Rally2	5:32.3	Rossel / Renucci
20 November	SS8	San Fermo 1	14.80 km	Crugnola / Ometto	Hyundai i20 N Rally2	9:49.5	Rossel / Renucci
20 November	SS9	Selvino 1	24.93 km	Crugnola / Ometto	Hyundai i20 N Rally2	17:08.6	Rossel / Renucci
20 November	SS10	San Fermo 2	14.80 km	Crugnola / Ometto	Hyundai i20 N Rally2	9:42.7	Rossel / Renucci
20 November	SS11	Selvino 2	24.93 km	Rossel / Renucci	Citroën C3 Rally2	17:02.0	Rossel / Renucci
20 November	SS12	Sottozero 1	14.39 km	Kajetanowicz / Szczepaniak	Škoda Fabia Rally2 evo	9:33.0	Rossel / Renucci
20 November	SS13	Sottozero 2	14.39 km	Crugnola / Ometto	Hyundai i20 N Rally2	9:33.0	Crugnola / Ometto
21 November	SS14	Grand Prix 2	10.29 km	Crugnola / Ometto	Hyundai i20 N Rally2	5:27.7	Crugnola / Ometto
21 November	SS15	Serraglio 1	14.62 km	Kajetanowicz / Szczepaniak	Škoda Fabia Rally2 evo	10:37.0	Crugnola / Ometto
21 November	SS16	Serraglio 2 [Power Stage]	14.62 km	Rossel / Renucci	Citroën C3 Rally2	10:27.2	Crugnola / Ometto

==== Championship standings ====
- **Bold text** indicates 2021 World Champions.

Pos.	Drivers' championships			Co-drivers' championships		
Pos.	Move	Driver	Points	Move	Co-driver	Points
1	1	**Yohan Rossel**	130		**Maciek Szczepaniak**	127
2	1	Kajetan Kajetanowicz	127		Alexandre Coria	99
3		Emil Lindholm	73		Ross Whittock	70
4		Chris Ingram	70		Yannick Roche	57
5		Nicolas Ciamin	57		Reeta Hämäläinen	53

== Notes ==
Previous rally: 2021 Rally Catalunya	2021 FIA World Rally Championship	Next rally: 2022 Monte Carlo Rally (2022)
Previous rally: 2020 Rally Monza	2021 Rally Monza	Next rally: TBD
