= 2021 Monte Carlo Rally =

89th edition of Rallye Automobile Monte-Carlo

2021 Monte Carlo Rally 89^{e} Rallye Automobile Monte-Carlo
Round 1 of 12 in the 2021 World Rally Championship
Next event →
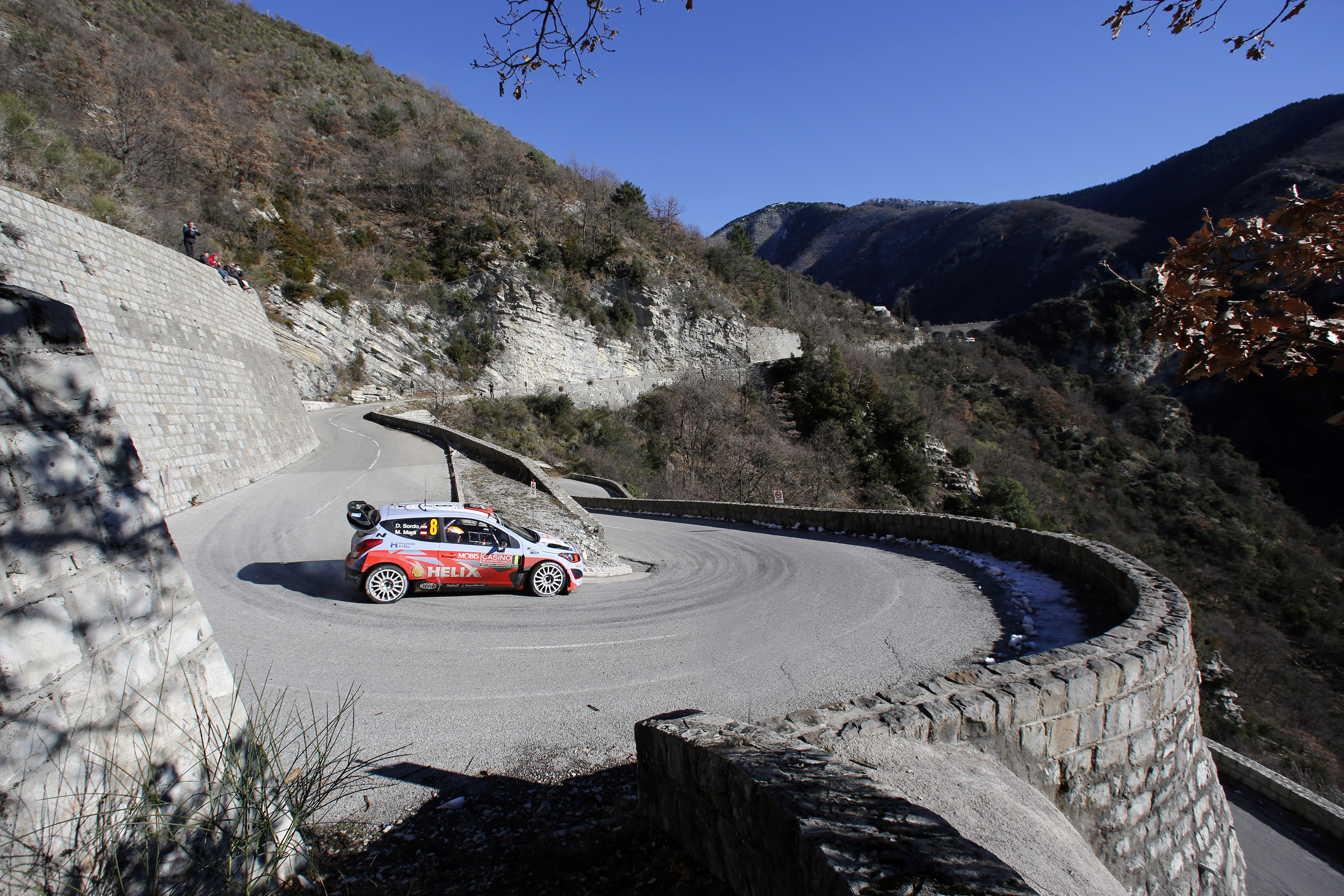
- The Monte Carlo Rally is run on a mixture of tarmac and snow stages.
- Host country: Monaco (Note: Although the rally was run in France, the Fédération Internationale de l'Automobile does not consider France to be the host nation.)
- Rally base: Gap, Hautes-Alpes
- Dates run: 21 – 24 January 2021
- Start location: Quai Albert, Monaco
- Finish location: Casino Square, Monaco
- Stages: 14 (257.64 km; 160.09 miles)
- Stage surface: Tarmac and snow
- Transport distance: 1,135.24 km (705.41 miles)
- Overall distance: 1,392.88 km (865.50 miles)

Statistics
- Crews registered: 84
- Crews: 76 at start, 62 at finish

Overall results
- Overall winner: (France) Sébastien Ogier (France) Julien Ingrassia (Japan) Toyota Gazoo Racing WRT; 2:56:33.7
- Power Stage winner: (France) Sébastien Ogier (France) Julien Ingrassia (Japan) Toyota Gazoo Racing WRT; 10:56.2

Support category results
- WRC-2 winner: (Norway) Andreas Mikkelsen (Norway) Ola Fløene (Germany) Toksport WRT; 3:03:57.3
- WRC-3 winner: (France) Yohan Rossel (France) Benoît Fulcrand; 3:08:20.8

The 2021 Monte Carlo Rally (also known as the 89^{e} Rallye Automobile Monte-Carlo) was a motor racing event for rally cars that was held over four days between 21 and 24 January 2021. It marked the eighty-ninth running of the Monte Carlo Rally, and was the first round of the 2021 World Rally Championship, World Rally Championship-2 and World Rally Championship-3. The 2021 event was based in the town of Gap in the Hautes-Alpes department of France. The rally consisted of fourteen special stages, covering a total competitive distance of 257.64 km (160.09 mi).

Thierry Neuville and Nicolas Gilsoul were the defending rally winners. Their team, Hyundai Shell Mobis WRT, were the reigning manufacturers' winners. Mads Østberg and Torstein Eriksen were the defending winners in the WRC-2 category, while Eric Camilli and François-Xavier Buresi were the defending rally winners in the WRC-3 category. Østberg and Eriksen did not defend their WRC-2 title as they did not enter the rally. Camilli and Buresi did not defend their WRC-3 win as they entered in the WRC-2 category.

Sébastien Ogier and Julien Ingrassia won the rally, their eighth win in Monte Carlo. The result saw them set a new record for wins in Monte Carlo. Andreas Mikkelsen and Ola Fløene won the World Rally Championship-2 category, while Yohan Rossel and Benoît Fulcrand were the winners in the World Rally Championship-3.

== Background ==
=== Entry list ===
The following crews were entered into the rally. The event was open to crews competing in the World Rally Championship, its support categories, the World Rally Championship-2 and World Rally Championship-3, and privateer entries that were not registered to score points in any championship. Ten crews were entered under Rally1 regulations, as were eighteen Rally2 crews; of these, seven were nominated to score points in the World Rally Championship-2 and eleven in the World Rally Championship-3.

Rally1 entries competing in the World Rally Championship
| No. | Driver | Co-Driver | Entrant | Car | Tyre |
|---|---|---|---|---|---|
| 1 | (France) Sébastien Ogier | (France) Julien Ingrassia | (Japan) Toyota Gazoo Racing WRT | Toyota Yaris WRC | P |
| 3 | (Finland) Teemu Suninen | (Finland) Mikko Markkula | (United Kingdom) M-Sport Ford WRT | Ford Fiesta WRC | P |
| 6 | (Spain) Dani Sordo | (Spain) Carlos del Barrio | (South Korea) Hyundai Shell Mobis WRT | Hyundai i20 Coupe WRC | P |
| 7 | (France) Pierre-Louis Loubet | (France) Vincent Landais | (France) Hyundai 2C Competition | Hyundai i20 Coupe WRC | P |
| 8 | (Estonia) Ott Tänak | (Estonia) Martin Järveoja | (South Korea) Hyundai Shell Mobis WRT | Hyundai i20 Coupe WRC | P |
| 11 | (Belgium) Thierry Neuville | (Belgium) Martijn Wydaeghe | (South Korea) Hyundai Shell Mobis WRT | Hyundai i20 Coupe WRC | P |
| 18 | (Japan) Takamoto Katsuta | (United Kingdom) Daniel Barritt | (Japan) Toyota Gazoo Racing WRT | Toyota Yaris WRC | P |
| 33 | (United Kingdom) Elfyn Evans | (United Kingdom) Scott Martin | (Japan) Toyota Gazoo Racing WRT | Toyota Yaris WRC | P |
| 44 | (United Kingdom) Gus Greensmith | (United Kingdom) Elliott Edmondson | (United Kingdom) M-Sport Ford WRT | Ford Fiesta WRC | P |
| 69 | (Finland) Kalle Rovanperä | (Finland) Jonne Halttunen | (Japan) Toyota Gazoo Racing WRT | Toyota Yaris WRC | P |

Rally2 entries competing in the World Rally Championship-2
| No. | Driver | Co-Driver | Entrant | Car | Tyre |
|---|---|---|---|---|---|
| 20 | (France) Adrien Fourmaux | (Belgium) Renaud Jamoul | (United Kingdom) M-Sport Ford WRT | Ford Fiesta R5 Mk. II | P |
| 22 | (Bolivia) Marco Bulacia Wilkinson | (Argentina) Marcelo Der Ohannesian | (Germany) Toksport WRT | Škoda Fabia R5 Evo | P |
| 24 | (France) Eric Camilli | (France) François-Xavier Buresi | (Portugal) Sports & You | Citroën C3 Rally2 | P |
| 25 | (Norway) Andreas Mikkelsen | (Norway) Ola Fløene | (Germany) Toksport WRT | Škoda Fabia R5 Evo | P |
| 27 | (Italy) Enrico Brazzoli | (Italy) Maurizio Barone | (Italy) Movisport | Škoda Fabia R5 | P |
| 28 | (United States) Sean Johnston | (United States) Alex Kihurani | (France) Saintéloc Junior | Citroën C3 Rally2 | P |

Rally2 entries competing in the World Rally Championship-3 (Note: Under the Sporting Regulations, each car competing in the World Rally Championship-3 is entered under the driver's name.)
| No. | Driver | Co-Driver | Entrant | Car | Tyre |
|---|---|---|---|---|---|
| 29 | (France) Nicolas Ciamin | (France) Yannick Roche | (France) Nicolas Ciamin | Citroën C3 Rally2 | P |
| 30 | (France) Yohan Rossel | (France) Benoît Fulcrand | (France) Yohan Rossel | Citroën C3 Rally2 | P |
| 31 | (Spain) Miguel Díaz-Aboitiz | (Spain) Diego Sanjuan | (Spain) Miguel Díaz-Aboitiz | Škoda Fabia R5 Evo | P |
| 32 | (Belgium) Cédric De Cecco | (Belgium) Jérôme Humblet | (Belgium) Cédric De Cecco | Škoda Fabia R5 Evo | P |
| 34 | (Italy) Giacomo Ogliari | (Italy) Lorenzo Granai | (Italy) Giacomo Ogliari | Citroën C3 Rally2 | P |
| 35 | (Italy) Fabrizio Arengi Bentivoglio | (Italy) Massimiliano Bosi | (Italy) Fabrizio Arengi Bentivoglio | Škoda Fabia R5 | P |
| 36 | (Austria) Johannes Keferböck | (Austria) Ilka Minor | (Austria) Johannes Keferböck | Škoda Fabia R5 Evo | P |
| 37 | (Belgium) Cédric Cherain | (Belgium) Stéphane Prévot | (Belgium) Cédric Cherain | Škoda Fabia R5 | P |
| 38 | (United Kingdom) Tom Williams | (Italy) Giorgia Ascalone | (United Kingdom) Tom Williams | Ford Fiesta R5 Mk. II | P |
| 39 | (Austria) Hermann Neubauer | (Austria) Bernhard Ettel | (Austria) Hermann Neubauer | Ford Fiesta R5 Mk. II | P |
| 40 | (Belgium) Davy Vanneste | (Belgium) Kris D'Alleine | (Belgium) Davy Vanneste | Citroën C3 Rally2 | P |
| 55 | (France) Yoann Bonato | (France) Benjamin Boulloud | (France) Yoann Bonato | Citroën C3 Rally2 | P |
| 57 | (Italy) Mauro Miele | (Italy) Luca Beltrame | (Italy) Mauro Miele | Škoda Fabia R5 | P |

Other major entries
| No. | Driver | Co-Driver | Entrant | Car | Tyre |
|---|---|---|---|---|---|
| 21 | Nikolay Gryazin (Note: Nikolay Gryazin is Russian, but he competes as a neutral competitor using the designation RAF (Russian Automobile Federation), as the Court of Arbitration for Sport upheld a ban on Russia competing at World Championships. The ban was implemented by the World Anti-Doping Agency in response to state-sponsored doping program of Russian athletes.) | Konstantin Aleksandrov (Note: Konstantin Aleksandrov is Russian, but he competes as a neutral competitor using the designation RAF (Russian Automobile Federation), as the Court of Arbitration for Sport upheld a ban on Russia competing at World Championships. The ban was implemented by the World Anti-Doping Agency in response to state-sponsored doping program of Russian athletes.) | (Italy) Movisport | Volkswagen Polo GTI R5 | P |
| 23 | (Sweden) Oliver Solberg | (Republic of Ireland) Aaron Johnston | (South Korea) Hyundai Motorsport N | Hyundai i20 R5 | P |
| 26 | (Netherlands) Kevin Abbring | (Belgium) Pieter Tsjoen | (Belgium) Pieter Tsjoen | Volkswagen Polo GTI R5 | P |
| 59 | (Italy) Carlo Covi | (Italy) Michela Lorigiola | (Italy) Carlo Covi | Škoda Fabia R5 | P |

=== Route ===
The route for the 2021 rally covers 257.64 km (160.09 mi) in competitive stages and is the shortest in the event's history. The rally was originally planned to be run over sixteen stages, but was reduced to fifteen amid concerns over organisers' ability to run the event during the COVID-19 pandemic, and ultimately to fourteen so as to respect the curfew established throughout France from 6 p.m. to 6 a.m.

==== Itinerary ====
All dates and times are CET (UTC+1).

| Leg | Date | Time | No. | Stage name | Distance |
|---|---|---|---|---|---|
| 1 | 21 January | 14:08 | SS1 | Saint-Disdier – Corps | 20.58 km |
| 1 | 21 January | 15:06 | SS2 | Saint-Maurice – Saint-Bonnet | 20.78 km |
| 1 | 22 January | 06:10 | SS3 | Aspremont – La Bâtie-des-Fonts 1 | 19.61 km |
| 1 | 22 January | 07:28 | SS4 | Chalancon – Gumiane 1 | 21.62 km |
| 1 | 22 January | 09:01 | SS5 | Montauban-sur-l’Ouvèze – Villebois-les-Pins | 22.24 km |
| 1 | 22 January | 12:17 | SS6 | Aspremont – La Bâtie-des-Fonts 2 | 19.61 km |
| 1 | 22 January | 13:38 | SS7 | Chalancon – Gumiane 2 | 21.62 km |
| 2 | 23 January | 06:30 | SS8 | La Bréole – Selonnet 1 | 18.31 km |
| 2 | 23 January | 08:18 | SS9 | Saint-Clément – Freissinières | 21.33 km |
| 2 | 23 January | 12:08 | SS10 | La Bréole – Selonnet 2 | 18.31 km |
| 3 | 24 January | 08:30 | SS11 | Puget-Théniers – La Penne 1 | 12.93 km |
| 3 | 24 January | 10:08 | SS12 | Briançonnet – Entrevaux 1 | 14.31 km |
| 3 | 24 January | 10:45 | SS13 | Puget-Théniers – La Penne 2 | 12.93 km |
| 3 | 24 January | 12:18 | SS14 | Briançonnet – Entrevaux 2 [Power Stage] | 14.31 km |

== Report ==
=== World Rally Cars ===
==== Classification ====
| Position | | No. | Driver | Co-driver | Entrant | Car | Time | Difference | Points | |
| Event | Class | No. | Driver | Co-driver | Entrant | Car | Time | Difference | Event | Stage |
|---|---|---|---|---|---|---|---|---|---|---|
| 1 | 1 | 1 | Sébastien Ogier | Julien Ingrassia | Toyota Gazoo Racing WRT | Toyota Yaris WRC | 2:56:33.7 | 0.0 | 25 | 5 |
| 2 | 2 | 33 | Elfyn Evans | Scott Martin | Toyota Gazoo Racing WRT | Toyota Yaris WRC | 2:57:06.3 | +32.6 | 18 | 3 |
| 3 | 3 | 11 | Thierry Neuville | Martijn Wydaeghe | Hyundai Shell Mobis WRT | Hyundai i20 Coupe WRC | 2:57:47.2 | +1:13.5 | 15 | 2 |
| 4 | 4 | 69 | Kalle Rovanperä | Jonne Halttunen | Toyota Gazoo Racing WRT | Toyota Yaris WRC | 2:59:07.3 | +2:33.6 | 12 | 4 |
| 5 | 5 | 6 | Dani Sordo | Carlos del Barrio | Hyundai Shell Mobis WRT | Hyundai i20 Coupe WRC | 2:59:47.9 | +3:14.2 | 10 | 1 |
| 6 | 6 | 18 | Takamoto Katsuta | Daniel Barritt | Toyota Gazoo Racing WRT | Toyota Yaris WRC | 3:03:35.0 | +7:01.3 | 8 | 0 |
| 8 | 7 | 44 | Gus Greensmith | Elliott Edmondson | M-Sport Ford WRT | Ford Fiesta WRC | 3:04:54.8 | +8:21.1 | 4 | 0 |
| 16 | 8 | 7 | Pierre-Louis Loubet | Vincent Landais | Hyundai 2C Competition | Hyundai i20 Coupe WRC | 3:14:50.1 | +18:16.4 | 0 | 0 |
| Retired SS11 | | 8 | Ott Tänak | Martin Järveoja | Hyundai Shell Mobis WRT | Hyundai i20 Coupe WRC | Roadworthiness (Note: Tänak and Järveoja were forced to retire after getting a puncture. The puncture meant that they did not have enough rubber on one of their wheels for the car to be considered road legal. As a result, they could not complete the liaison between special stages.) | | 0 | 0 |
| Retired SS1 | | 3 | Teemu Suninen | Mikko Markkula | M-Sport Ford WRT | Ford Fiesta WRC | Accident | | 0 | 0 |

==== Special stages ====
| Day | Stage | Stage name | Length | Winners | Car | Time | Class leaders |
|---|---|---|---|---|---|---|---|
| 21 January | SS1 | Saint-Disdier – Corps | 20.58 km | Tänak / Järveoja | Hyundai i20 Coupe WRC | 12:05.7 | Tänak / Järveoja |
| 21 January | SS2 | Saint-Maurice – Saint-Bonnet | 20.78 km | Tänak / Järveoja | Hyundai i20 Coupe WRC | 12:11.8 | Tänak / Järveoja |
| 22 January | SS3 | Aspremont – La Bâtie-des-Fonts 1 | 19.61 km | Ogier / Ingrassia | Toyota Yaris WRC | 14:00.9 | Rovanperä / Halttunen |
| 22 January | SS4 | Chalancon – Gumiane 1 | 21.62 km | Ogier / Ingrassia | Toyota Yaris WRC | 13:36.8 | Ogier / Ingrassia |
| 22 January | SS5 | Montauban-sur-l’Ouvèze – Villebois-les-Pins | 22.24 km | Ogier / Ingrassia | Toyota Yaris WRC | 13:35.8 | Ogier / Ingrassia |
| 22 January | SS6 | Aspremont – La Bâtie-des-Fonts 2 | 19.61 km | Evans / Martin | Toyota Yaris WRC | 13:32.5 | Evans / Martin |
| 22 January | SS7 | Chalancon – Gumiane 2 | 21.62 km | Ogier / Ingrassia | Toyota Yaris WRC | 14:09.8 | Evans / Martin |
| 23 January | SS8 | La Bréole – Selonnet 1 | 18.31 km | Ogier / Ingrassia | Toyota Yaris WRC | 13:16.2 | Ogier / Ingrassia |
| 23 January | SS9 | Saint-Clément – Freissinières | 21.33 km | Neuville / Wydaeghe | Hyundai i20 Coupe WRC | 16:28.3 | Ogier / Ingrassia |
| 23 January | SS10 | La Bréole – Selonnet 2 | 18.31 km | Evans / Martin | Toyota Yaris WRC | 11:59.0 | Ogier / Ingrassia |
| 24 January | SS11 | Puget-Théniers – La Penne 1 | 12.93 km | Ogier / Ingrassia | Toyota Yaris WRC | 8:47.6 | Ogier / Ingrassia |
| 24 January | SS12 | Briançonnet – Entrevaux 1 | 14.31 km | Neuville / Wydaeghe | Hyundai i20 Coupe WRC | 11:29.6 | Ogier / Ingrassia |
| 24 January | SS13 | Puget-Théniers – La Penne 2 | 12.93 km | Ogier / Ingrassia | Toyota Yaris WRC | 8:42.6 | Ogier / Ingrassia |
| 24 January | SS14 | Briançonnet – Entrevaux 2 [Power Stage] | 14.31 km | Ogier / Ingrassia | Toyota Yaris WRC | 10:56.2 | Ogier / Ingrassia |

==== Championship standings ====
| Pos. | Drivers' championships | | | Co-drivers' championships | | | Manufacturers' championships | | |
| Pos. | Move | Driver | Points | Move | Co-driver | Points | Move | Manufacturer | Points |
|---|---|---|---|---|---|---|---|---|---|
| 1 | New entry | Sébastien Ogier | 30 | New entry | Julien Ingrassia | 30 | New entry | Toyota Gazoo Racing WRT | 52 |
| 2 | New entry | Elfyn Evans | 21 | New entry | Scott Martin | 21 | New entry | Hyundai Shell Mobis WRT | 30 |
| 3 | New entry | Thierry Neuville | 17 | New entry | Martijn Wydaeghe | 17 | New entry | M-Sport Ford WRT | 10 |
| 4 | New entry | Kalle Rovanperä | 16 | New entry | Jonne Halttunen | 16 | New entry | Hyundai 2C Competition | 8 |
| 5 | New entry | Dani Sordo | 11 | New entry | Carlos del Barrio | 11 | | | |

=== World Rally Championship-2 ===
==== Classification ====
| Position | | No. | Driver | Co-driver | Entrant | Car | Time | Difference | Points | | |
| Event | Class | No. | Driver | Co-driver | Entrant | Car | Time | Difference | Class | Stage | Event |
|---|---|---|---|---|---|---|---|---|---|---|---|
| 7 | 1 | 25 | Andreas Mikkelsen | Ola Fløene | Toksport WRT | Škoda Fabia R5 Evo | 3:03:57.3 | 0.0 | 25 | 5 | 6 |
| 9 | 2 | 20 | Adrien Fourmaux | Renaud Jamoul | M-Sport Ford WRT | Ford Fiesta R5 Mk. II | 3:05:49.5 | +1:52.2 | 18 | 4 | 2 |
| 10 | 3 | 24 | Eric Camilli | François-Xavier Buresi | Sports & You | Citroën C3 Rally2 | 3:07:09.7 | +3:12.4 | 15 | 2 | 1 |
| 15 | 4 | 22 | Marco Bulacia Wilkinson | Marcelo Der Ohannesian | Toksport WRT | Škoda Fabia R5 Evo | 3:12:49.1 | +8:51.8 | 12 | 3 | 0 |
| 17 | 5 | 28 | Sean Johnston | Alex Kihurani | Saintéloc Junior | Citroën C3 Rally2 | 3:16:59.5 | +13:02.2 | 10 | 1 | 0 |
| 43 | 6 | 27 | Enrico Brazzoli | Maurizio Barone | Movisport | Škoda Fabia R5 | 3:49:22.3 | +45:25.0 | 8 | 0 | 0 |

==== Special stages ====
| Day | Stage | Stage name | Length | Winners | Car | Time | Class leaders |
|---|---|---|---|---|---|---|---|
| 21 January | SS1 | Saint-Disdier – Corps | 20.58 km | Mikkelsen / Fløene | Škoda Fabia R5 Evo | 12:52.2 | Mikkelsen / Fløene |
| 21 January | SS2 | Saint-Maurice – Saint-Bonnet | 20.78 km | Fourmaux / Jamoul | Ford Fiesta R5 Mk. II | 12:37.7 | Mikkelsen / Fløene |
| 22 January | SS3 | Aspremont – La Bâtie-des-Fonts 1 | 19.61 km | Mikkelsen / Fløene | Škoda Fabia R5 Evo | 14:49.9 | Mikkelsen / Fløene |
| 22 January | SS4 | Chalancon – Gumiane 1 | 21.62 km | Mikkelsen / Fløene | Škoda Fabia R5 Evo | 14:21.2 | Mikkelsen / Fløene |
| 22 January | SS5 | Montauban-sur-l’Ouvèze – Villebois-les-Pins | 22.24 km | Fourmaux / Jamoul | Ford Fiesta R5 Mk. II | 14:31.6 | Mikkelsen / Fløene |
| 22 January | SS6 | Aspremont – La Bâtie-des-Fonts 2 | 19.61 km | Mikkelsen / Fløene | Škoda Fabia R5 Evo | 13:47.7 | Mikkelsen / Fløene |
| 22 January | SS7 | Chalancon – Gumiane 2 | 21.62 km | Mikkelsen / Fløene | Škoda Fabia R5 Evo | 14:40.6 | Mikkelsen / Fløene |
| 23 January | SS8 | La Bréole – Selonnet 1 | 18.31 km | Mikkelsen / Fløene | Škoda Fabia R5 Evo | 13:55.6 | Mikkelsen / Fløene |
| 23 January | SS9 | Saint-Clément – Freissinières | 21.33 km | Mikkelsen / Fløene | Škoda Fabia R5 Evo | 17:34.0 | Mikkelsen / Fløene |
| 23 January | SS10 | La Bréole – Selonnet 2 | 18.31 km | Fourmaux / Jamoul | Ford Fiesta R5 Mk. II | 12:22.2 | Mikkelsen / Fløene |
| 24 January | SS11 | Puget-Théniers – La Penne 1 | 12.93 km | Camilli / Buresi | Citroën C3 Rally2 | 9:07.9 | Mikkelsen / Fløene |
| 24 January | SS12 | Briançonnet – Entrevaux 1 | 14.31 km | Fourmaux / Jamoul | Ford Fiesta R5 Mk. II | 11:52.6 | Mikkelsen / Fløene |
| 24 January | SS13 | Puget-Théniers – La Penne 2 | 12.93 km | Camilli / Buresi | Citroën C3 Rally2 | 8:57.2 | Mikkelsen / Fløene |
| 24 January | SS14 | Briançonnet – Entrevaux 2 [Power Stage] | 14.31 km | Mikkelsen / Fløene | Škoda Fabia R5 Evo | 11:21.9 | Mikkelsen / Fløene |

==== Championship standings ====
| Pos. | Drivers' championships | | | Co-drivers' championships | | | Teams' championships | | |
| Pos. | Move | Driver | Points | Move | Co-driver | Points | Move | Manufacturer | Points |
|---|---|---|---|---|---|---|---|---|---|
| 1 | New entry | Andreas Mikkelsen | 30 | New entry | Ola Fløene | 30 | New entry | Toksport WRT | 40 |
| 2 | New entry | Adrien Fourmaux | 22 | New entry | Renaud Jamoul | 22 | New entry | Movisport | 30 |
| 3 | New entry | Eric Camilli | 17 | New entry | François-Xavier Buresi | 17 | | | |
| 4 | New entry | Marco Bulacia Wilkinson | 15 | New entry | Marcelo Der Ohannesian | 15 | | | |
| 5 | New entry | Sean Johnston | 11 | New entry | Alex Kihurani | 11 | | | |

=== World Rally Championship-3 ===
==== Classification ====
| Position | | No. | Driver | Co-driver | Entrant | Car | Time | Difference | Points | | |
| Event | Class | No. | Driver | Co-driver | Entrant | Car | Time | Difference | Class | Stage | Event |
|---|---|---|---|---|---|---|---|---|---|---|---|
| 11 | 1 | 30 | Yohan Rossel | Benoît Fulcrand | Yohan Rossel | Citroën C3 Rally2 | 3:08:25.8 | 0.0 | 25 | 3 | 0 |
| 13 | 2 | 55 | Yoann Bonato | Benjamin Boulloud | Yoann Bonato | Citroën C3 Rally2 | 3:09:35.0 | +1:09.2 | 18 | 4 | 0 |
| 14 | 3 | 29 | Nicolas Ciamin | Yannick Roche | Nicolas Ciamin | Citroën C3 Rally2 | 3:10:48.9 | +2:23.1 | 15 | 5 | 0 |
| 19 | 4 | 39 | Hermann Neubauer | Bernhard Ettel | Hermann Neubauer | Ford Fiesta R5 Mk. II | 3:18:03.8 | +9:38.0 | 12 | 2 | 0 |
| 21 | 5 | 32 | Cédric De Cecco | Jérôme Humblet | Cédric De Cecco | Škoda Fabia R5 Evo | 3:20:55.8 | +12:30.0 | 10 | 1 | 0 |
| 23 | 6 | 40 | Davy Vanneste | Kris D'Alleine | Davy Vanneste | Citroën C3 Rally2 | 3:27:22.6 | +18:56.8 | 8 | 0 | 0 |
| 26 | 7 | 36 | Johannes Keferböck | Ilka Minor | Johannes Keferböck | Škoda Fabia R5 Evo | 3:28:39.6 | +20:13.8 | 6 | 0 | 0 |
| 28 | 8 | 34 | Giacomo Ogliari | Lorenzo Granai | Giacomo Ogliari | Citroën C3 Rally2 | 3:32:54.2 | +24:28.4 | 4 | 0 | 0 |
| 29 | 9 | 37 | Cédric Cherain | Stéphane Prévot | Cédric Cherain | Škoda Fabia R5 | 3:33:14.4 | +24:48.6 | 2 | 0 | 0 |
| 31 | 10 | 38 | Tom Williams | Giorgia Ascalone | Tom Williams | Ford Fiesta R5 Mk. II | 3:37:42.4 | +29:16.6 | 1 | 0 | 0 |
| 35 | 11 | 31 | Miguel Díaz-Aboitiz | Diego Sanjuan | Miguel Díaz-Aboitiz | Škoda Fabia R5 Evo | 3:46:56.9 | +38:31.1 | 0 | 0 | 0 |
| 44 | 12 | 35 | Fabrizio Arengi Bentivoglio | Massimiliano Bosi | Fabrizio Arengi Bentivoglio | Škoda Fabia R5 | 3:50:32.5 | +42:06.7 | 0 | 0 | 0 |
| Retired SS11 | | 57 | Mauro Miele | Luca Beltrame | Mauro Miele | Škoda Fabia R5 | Personal | | 0 | 0 | 0 |

==== Special stages ====
| Day | Stage | Stage name | Length | Winners | Car | Time | Class leaders |
|---|---|---|---|---|---|---|---|
| 21 January | SS1 | Saint-Disdier – Corps | 20.58 km | Rossel / Fulcrand | Citroën C3 Rally2 | 13:04.9 | Rossel / Fulcrand |
| 21 January | SS2 | Saint-Maurice – Saint-Bonnet | 20.78 km | Bonato / Boulloud | Citroën C3 Rally2 | 12:50.3 | Rossel / Fulcrand |
| 22 January | SS3 | Aspremont – La Bâtie-des-Fonts 1 | 19.61 km | Bonato / Boulloud | Citroën C3 Rally2 | 15:21.5 | Bonato / Boulloud |
| 22 January | SS4 | Chalancon – Gumiane 1 | 21.62 km | Bonato / Boulloud | Citroën C3 Rally2 | 14:50.3 | Bonato / Boulloud |
| 22 January | SS5 | Montauban-sur-l’Ouvèze – Villebois-les-Pins | 22.24 km | Ciamin / Roche | Citroën C3 Rally2 | 14:47.7 | Bonato / Boulloud |
| 22 January | SS6 | Aspremont – La Bâtie-des-Fonts 2 | 19.61 km | Rossel / Fulcrand | Citroën C3 Rally2 | 14:06.1 | Rossel / Fulcrand |
| 22 January | SS7 | Chalancon – Gumiane 2 | 21.62 km | Rossel / Fulcrand | Citroën C3 Rally2 | 15:10.3 | Rossel / Fulcrand |
| 23 January | SS8 | La Bréole – Selonnet 1 | 18.31 km | Bonato / Boulloud | Citroën C3 Rally2 | 14:05.6 | Bonato / Boulloud |
| 23 January | SS9 | Saint-Clément – Freissinières | 21.33 km | Rossel / Fulcrand | Citroën C3 Rally2 | 17:34.1 | Rossel / Fulcrand |
| 23 January | SS10 | La Bréole – Selonnet 2 | 18.31 km | Ciamin / Roche | Citroën C3 Rally2 | 12:23.6 | Rossel / Fulcrand |
| 24 January | SS11 | Puget-Théniers – La Penne 1 | 12.93 km | Ciamin / Roche | Citroën C3 Rally2 | 9:07.4 | Rossel / Fulcrand |
| 24 January | SS12 | Briançonnet – Entrevaux 1 | 14.31 km | Ciamin / Roche | Citroën C3 Rally2 | 12:12.8 | Rossel / Fulcrand |
| 24 January | SS13 | Puget-Théniers – La Penne 2 | 12.93 km | Rossel / Fulcrand | Citroën C3 Rally2 | 8:53.5 | Rossel / Fulcrand |
| 24 January | SS14 | Briançonnet – Entrevaux 2 [Power Stage] | 14.31 km | Ciamin / Roche | Citroën C3 Rally2 | 11:31.5 | Rossel / Fulcrand |

==== Championship standings ====
| Pos. | Drivers' championships | | | Co-drivers' championships | | |
| Pos. | Move | Driver | Points | Move | Co-driver | Points |
|---|---|---|---|---|---|---|
| 1 | New entry | Yohan Rossel | 28 | New entry | Benoît Fulcrand | 28 |
| 2 | New entry | Yoann Bonato | 22 | New entry | Benjamin Boulloud | 22 |
| 3 | New entry | Nicolas Ciamin | 20 | New entry | Yannick Roche | 20 |
| 4 | New entry | Hermann Neubauer | 14 | New entry | Bernhard Ettel | 14 |
| 5 | New entry | Cédric De Cecco | 11 | New entry | Jérôme Humblet | 11 |

== Notes ==
| Previous rally: 2020 Rally Monza (2020) | 2021 FIA World Rally Championship | Next rally: 2021 Arctic Rally Finland |
| Previous rally: 2020 Monte Carlo Rally | 2021 Monte Carlo Rally | Next rally: 2022 Monte Carlo Rally |
