= 2021 WRC2 Championship =

Motorsport championship

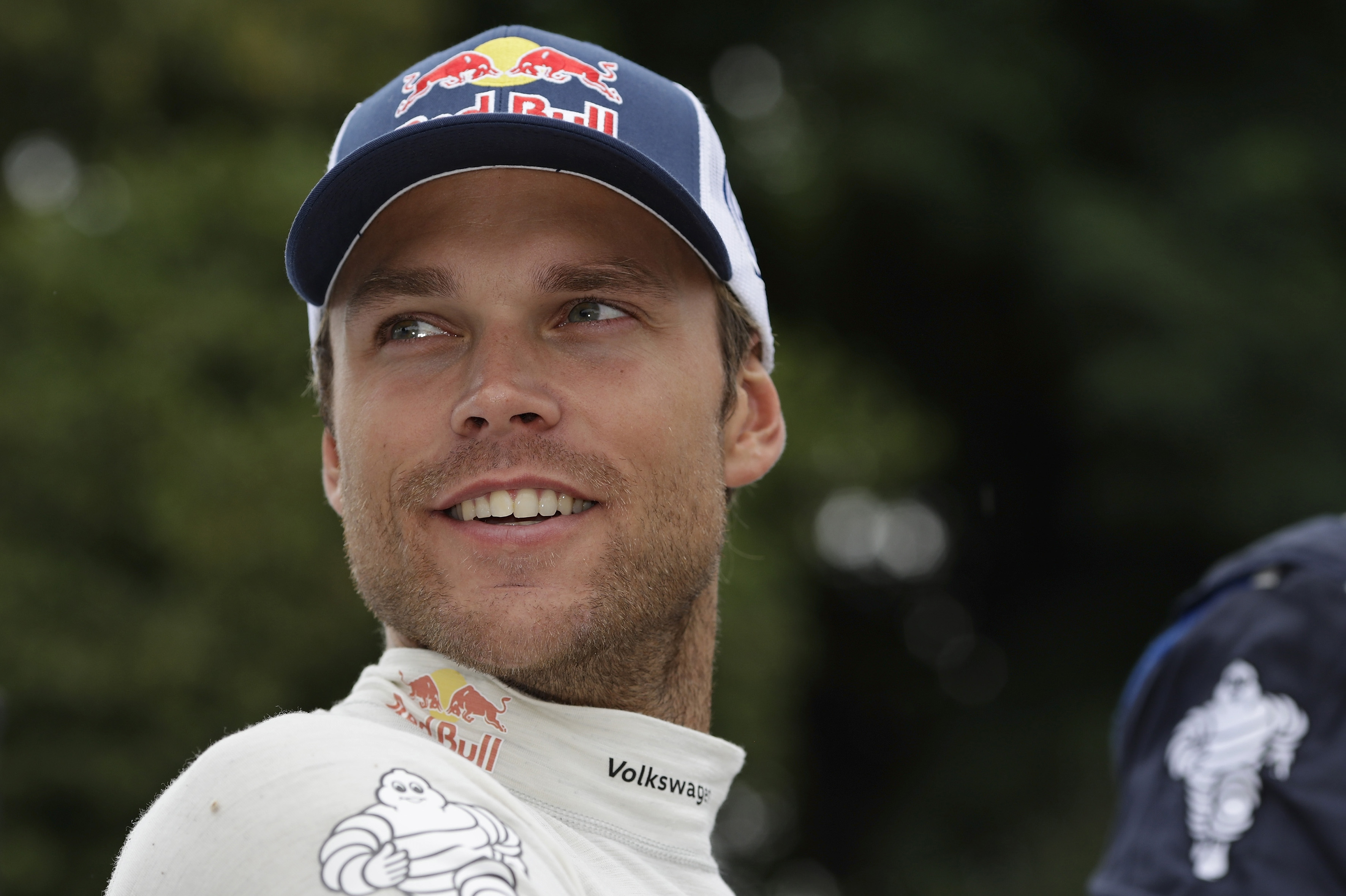
Andreas Mikkelsen is the 2021 WRC-2 drivers' champion.

The 2021 FIA WRC2 Championship was the ninth season of WRC2, a rallying championship for organised and governed by the Fédération Internationale de l'Automobile as the second-highest tier of international rallying. The category was open to cars entered by teams and complying with Rally2 regulations. The championship began in January 2021 with the Rallye Monte-Carlo and concluded in November 2021 with Rally Monza, and ran in support of the 2021 World Rally Championship.

Mads Østberg and Torstein Eriksen were the defending 2020 drivers' and co-drivers' champions. Toksport WRT were the defending teams' champions.

Andreas Mikkelsen was crowned 2021 drivers' champion at the penultimate round despite not competing there. As he had used different co-drivers through the season a co-driver of a different crew would therefore become co-driver champion. Torstein Eriksen, consistent co-driver of Mads Østberg, was able to retain his championship title. Movisport became the teams' champion.

== Calendar ==
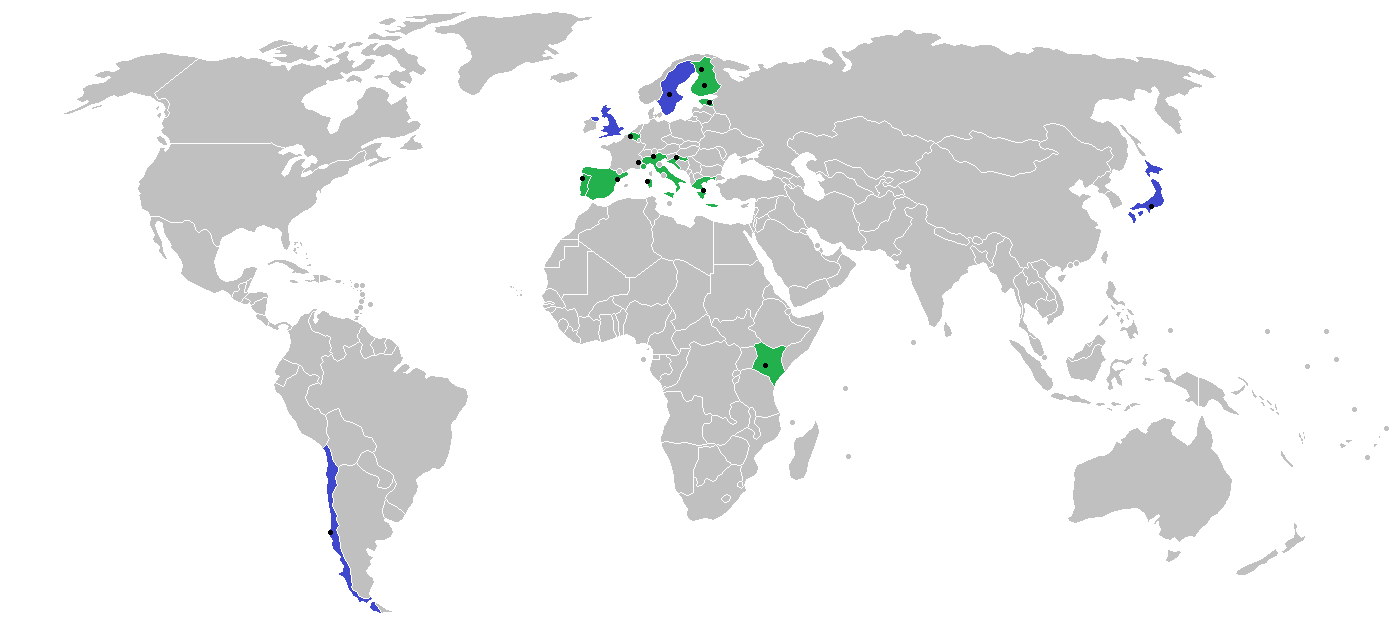
A map showing the locations of the rallies in the 2021 championship. Contested events are in green, while cancelled events are in blue. Event headquarters are marked with a black dot.

The 2021 championship was contested over twelve rounds in Europe and Africa:

Round	Start date	Finish date	Rally	Rally headquarters	Surface	Stages	Distance	Ref.
1	21 January	24 January	(Monaco) Rallye Automobile Monte Carlo	Gap, Provence-Alpes-Côte d'Azur (Note: The rally base of the Monte Carlo Rally was located in France.)	Mixed (Note: The Monte Carlo Rally was run on a tarmac and snow surface.)	14	257.64 km	
2	26 February	28 February	Arctic Rally Finland	Rovaniemi, Lapland	Snow	10	251.08 km	
3	22 April	25 April	Croatia Rally	Zagreb	Tarmac	20	300.32 km	
4	20 May	23 May	Rally de Portugal	Matosinhos, Porto	Gravel	20	337.51 km	
5	3 June	6 June	(Italy) Rally Italia Sardegna	Olbia, Sardinia	Gravel	20	303.10 km	
6	24 June	27 June	Safari Rally Kenya	Nairobi	Gravel	18	320.19 km	
7	15 July	18 July	Rally Estonia	Tartu, Tartu County	Gravel	24	314.16 km	
8	13 August	15 August	Ypres Rally Belgium	Ypres, West Flanders	Tarmac	20	295.78 km	
9	9 September	12 September	Acropolis Rally Greece	Lamia, Central Greece	Gravel	15	292.19 km	
10	1 October	3 October	Rally Finland	Jyväskylä, Central Finland	Gravel	19	287.11 km	
11	14 October	17 October	(Spain) RACC Rally Catalunya de España	Salou, Catalonia	Tarmac	17	280.46 km	
12	18 November	21 November	(Italy) ACI Rally Monza	Monza, Lombardy	Tarmac	16	253.18 km	

The following rounds were included on the original calendar published by WRC Promoter GmbH, but were later cancelled:

Start date	Finish date	Rally	Rally headquarters	Surface	Stages	Distance	Cancellation reason	Ref.
11 February	14 February	Rally Sweden	Torsby, Värmland	Snow	19	313.81 km	COVID-19 pandemic	
9 September	12 September	Rally Chile	Concepción, Biobío	Gravel	—N/a	—N/a	COVID-19 pandemic	
19 August	22 August	(United Kingdom) Rally GB	—N/a	—N/a	—N/a	—N/a	Financial issues	
11 November	14 November	Rally Japan	Nagoya, Chūbu	Tarmac	20	300.11 km	COVID-19 pandemic	

=== Calendar changes ===
With the addition of Rally Chile to the calendar in 2019, the FIA opened the tender process for new events to join the championship in 2020. Three events were successful, (Note: Rally New Zealand was successful in its bid to join the championship, but was cancelled because of the pandemic. It was not included on the 2021 calendar, but a separate, later bid from Rally Croatia was also successful.) but the championship was affected by a series of cancellations in 2019 and 2020 that necessitated changes to the 2021 calendar:

- Rally Catalunya returned to the championship. The rally was removed from the 2020 schedule as part of an event-sharing agreement that would see it removed from the calendar for one year, but was guaranteed a spot on the calendar for the next two. The rally returned to running exclusively on tarmac roads for the first time since 2009. (Note: Rally Catalunya had previously been run as a mixed surface rally, with the first leg of the event held on gravel roads and the final two legs on tarmac.)

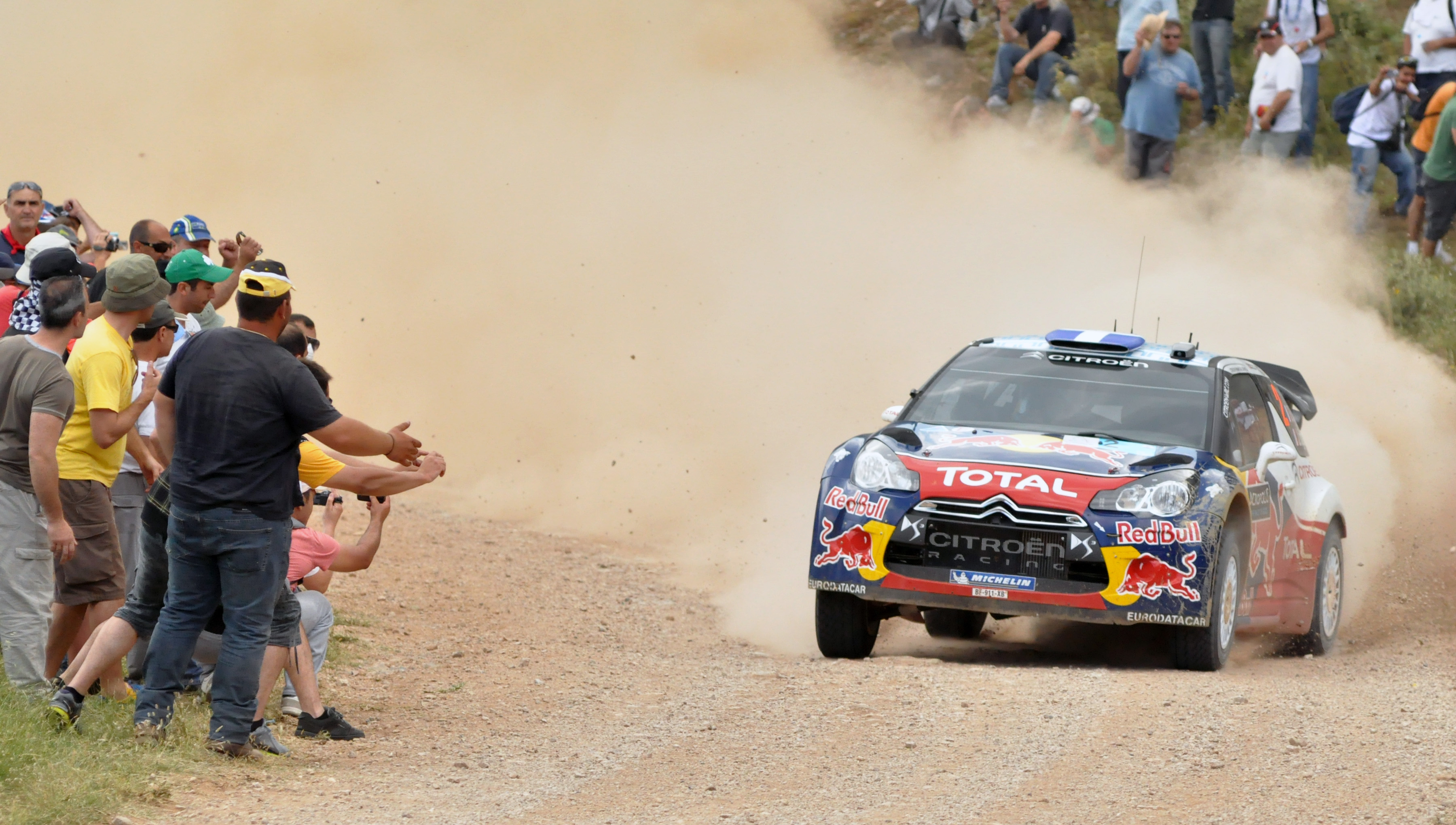
The Acropolis Rally of Greece returned to the championship for the first time since 2013.

- Rally Chile was due to return after a one-year absence. The rally had been included on the original draft of the 2020 calendar, but was later cancelled in the face of ongoing civil unrest in the country. Organisers of the event negotiated a return to the calendar for the 2021 championship, but it was again cancelled due to continued travel and other restrictions amid the COVID-19 pandemic. Acropolis Rally replaced the rally after a seven-year absence on the calendar.
- Rally Croatia made its championship debut, replacing Rally Mexico. Croatia thus became the 34th country to host a World Rally Championship round. It was based in Zagreb, and ran on tarmac roads.
- Rally Deutschland was removed from the calendar. The event had planned to run in 2020, but was cancelled due to the COVID-19 pandemic. It was not included on the 2021 calendar.
- The Rallies of Finland and Portugal also returned to the championship after a one-year absence. The 2020 events were cancelled in response to the COVID-19 pandemic.

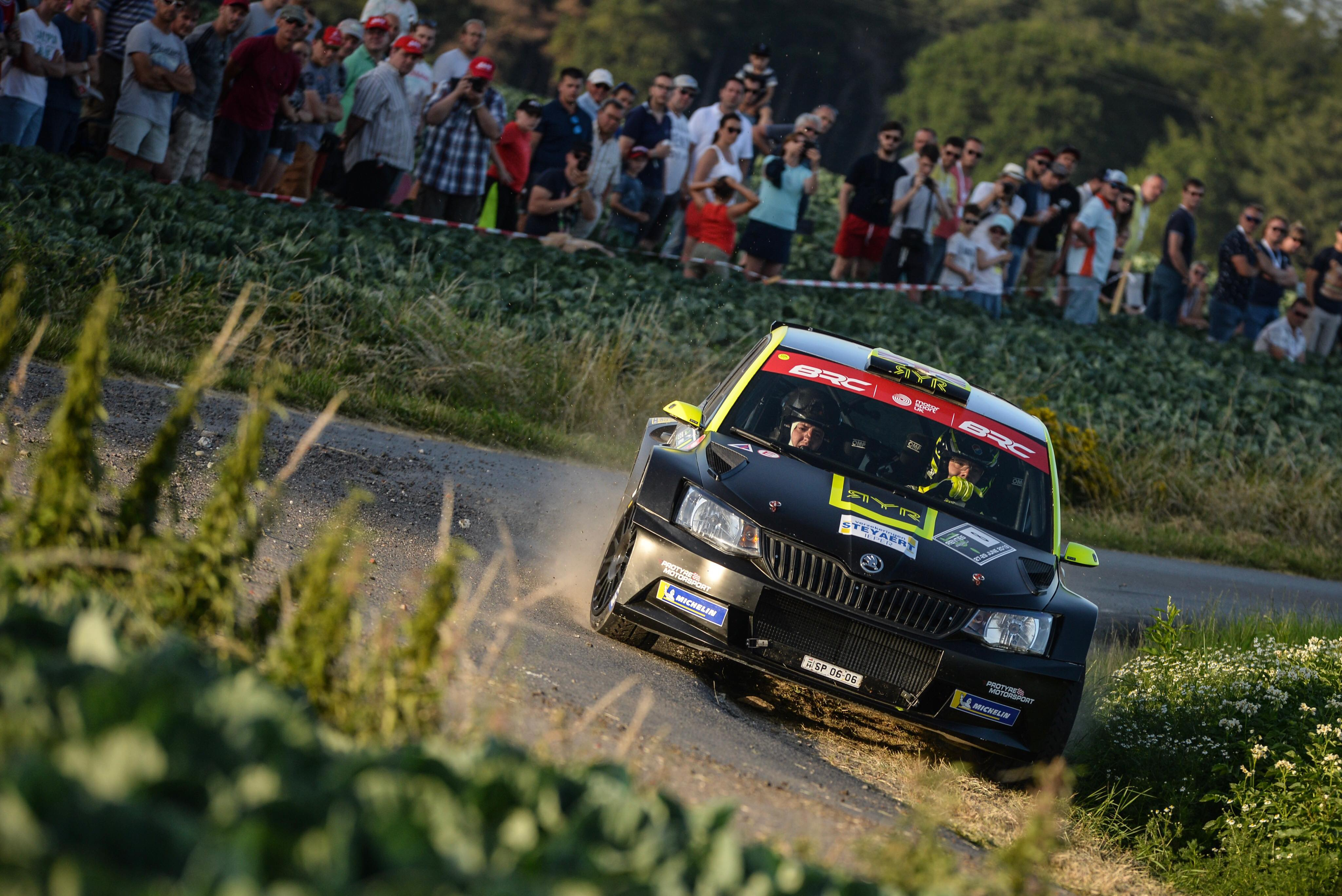
The Ypres Rally's debut made Belgium the 35th nation to hold a World Rally Championship event.

- Rally GB was replaced by the Ypres Rally in Belgium. Rally GB had originally planned to move from Wales to Northern Ireland, but the event was replaced when organisers were unable to come to an agreement with the government of Northern Ireland to support the rally.
- Rally Japan was scheduled to return to the calendar for the first time since 2010, but it was ultimately called off due to the COVID-19 pandemic. The rally was also originally included on the 2020 calendar, but was also cancelled because of the pandemic. Rally Monza was confirmed to hold the season finale for the second year in a row.
- The Safari Rally was run as a World Championship event for the first time since 2002. The event was based in the Kenyan capital Nairobi and featured stages around Lake Naivasha. The event had been planned to make its return to the championship in 2020, but was cancelled in response to the COVID-19 pandemic.

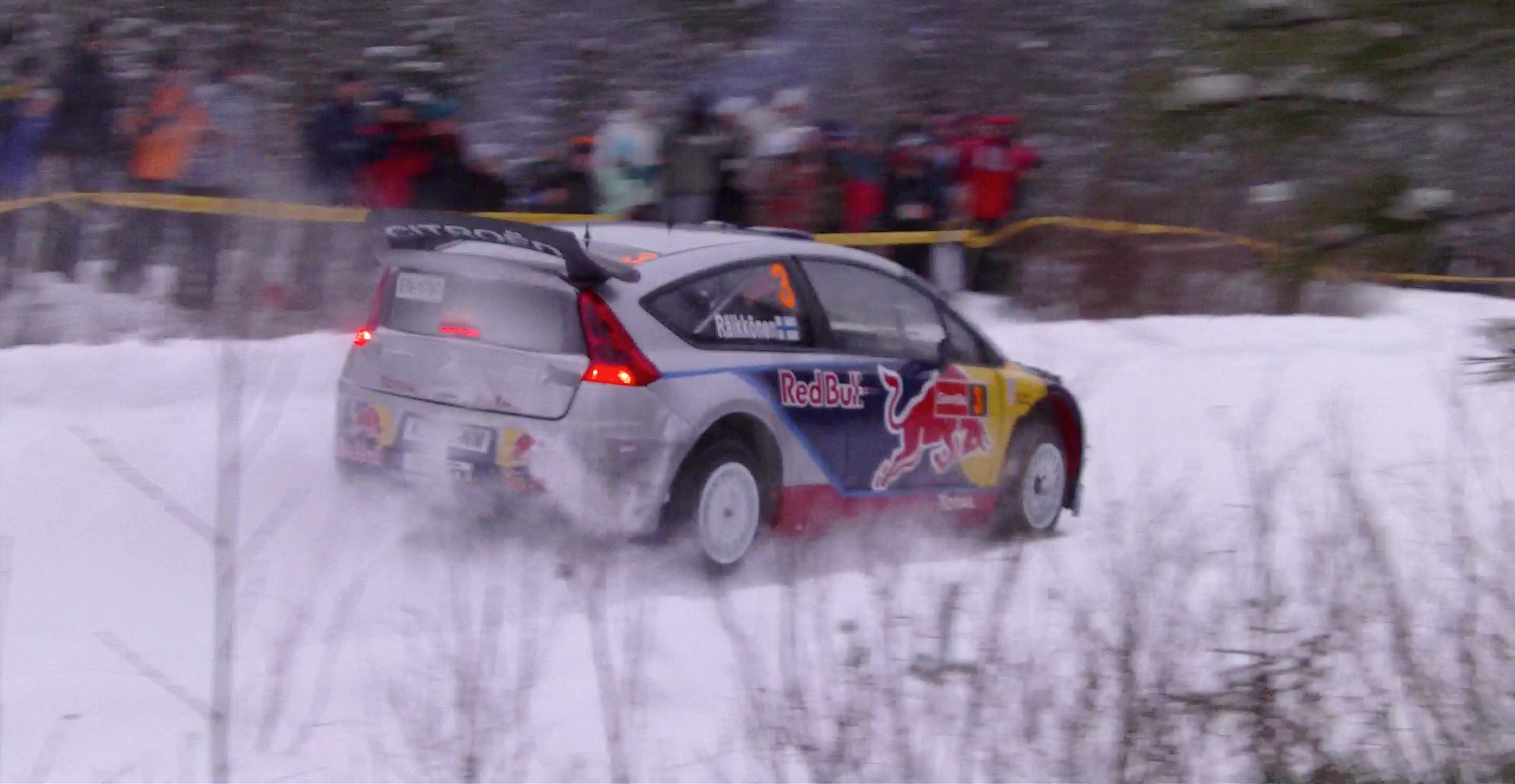
The Arctic Rally became the first World Rally Championship round to be held inside the Arctic Circle.

- Rally Sweden was included on the first draft of the calendar with its traditional February date, but was cancelled before the start of the season due to the COVID-19 pandemic. The Arctic Rally in northern Finland was chosen as a replacement to ensure that a winter rally was included on the calendar. (Note: The Arctic Rally was held twice during the 2021 calendar year. The first running in January was part of the Finnish Rally Championship and the second running in February was the World Championship round.)

In light of the disruption caused by the pandemic in 2020 and in anticipation of further delays, the calendar included an additional six reserve rounds that could be included in the event of rallies being cancelled. These events include rallies in Turkey, Argentina and Latvia. The Ypres Rally had also been included on this reserve list before it replaced Rally GB, so as the Acropolis Rally and Rally Monza.

== Entries ==
The following teams and crews entered 2021 WRC2:

Entrant	Car	Driver name	Co-driver name	Rounds
(United Kingdom) M-Sport Ford WRT	Ford Fiesta Rally2	(France) Adrien Fourmaux	(Belgium) Renaud Jamoul	1–2, 5, 7
(United Kingdom) M-Sport Ford WRT	Ford Fiesta Rally2	(Czech Republic) Martin Prokop	(Czech Republic) Michal Ernst	2, 9–10
(United Kingdom) M-Sport Ford WRT	Ford Fiesta Rally2	(Czech Republic) Martin Prokop	(Czech Republic) Viktor Chytka	4
(United Kingdom) M-Sport Ford WRT	Ford Fiesta Rally2	(Czech Republic) Martin Prokop	(Czech Republic) Zdeněk Jůrka	5–6
(United Kingdom) M-Sport Ford WRT	Ford Fiesta Rally2	(Finland) Teemu Suninen	(Finland) Mikko Markkula	3–4, 6, 8–9
(United Kingdom) M-Sport Ford WRT	Ford Fiesta Rally2	(Sweden) Tom Kristensson	(Sweden) David Arhusiander	3–4, 7–8, 10
(United Kingdom) M-Sport Ford WRT	Ford Fiesta Rally2	(Finland) Jari Huttunen	(Finland) Mikko Lukka	12
(Germany) Toksport WRT	Škoda Fabia Rally2 Evo	(Bolivia) Marco Bulacia	(Argentina) Marcelo Der Ohannesian	1, 3–7, 9, 12
(Germany) Toksport WRT	Škoda Fabia Rally2 Evo	(Norway) Andreas Mikkelsen	(Norway) Ola Fløene	1–7
(Germany) Toksport WRT	Škoda Fabia Rally2 Evo	(Norway) Andreas Mikkelsen	(United Kingdom) Elliott Edmondson	9
(Germany) Toksport WRT	Škoda Fabia Rally2 Evo	(Norway) Andreas Mikkelsen	(United Kingdom) Phil Hall	12
(Germany) Toksport WRT	Škoda Fabia Rally2 Evo	(Norway) Eyvind Brynildsen	(Norway) Veronica Engan	2
(Portugal) Sports & You	Citroën C3 Rally2	(France) Eric Camilli	(France) François-Xavier Buresi	1
(Portugal) Sports & You	Citroën C3 Rally2	(France) Eric Camilli	(France) Benjamin Veillas	4
(Portugal) Sports & You	Citroën C3 Rally2	(France) Eric Camilli	(France) Maxime Vilmot	11
(Italy) Movisport	Škoda Fabia R5	(Italy) Enrico Brazzoli	(Italy) Maurizio Barone	1, 3
(Italy) Movisport	Škoda Fabia R5	(Italy) Enrico Brazzoli	(Italy) Danilo Fappani	5
(Italy) Movisport	Škoda Fabia Rally2 Evo	(Italy) Enrico Brazzoli	(Italy) Manuel Fenoli	12
(Italy) Movisport	Škoda Fabia Rally2 Evo	Nikolay Gryazin (Note: Nikolay Gryazin is Russian, but he competes as a neutral competitor using the designation RAF (Russian Automobile Federation), as the Court of Arbitration for Sport upheld a ban on Russia competing at World Championships. The ban was implemented by the World Anti-Doping Agency in response to state-sponsored doping program of Russian athletes.)	Konstantin Aleksandrov (Note: Konstantin Aleksandrov is Russian, but he competes as a neutral competitor using the designation RAF (Russian Automobile Federation), as the Court of Arbitration for Sport upheld a ban on Russia competing at World Championships. The ban was implemented by the World Anti-Doping Agency in response to state-sponsored doping program of Russian athletes.)	11–12
(Italy) Movisport	Volkswagen Polo GTI R5	Nikolay Gryazin	Konstantin Aleksandrov	2–5, 7–8, 10
(Italy) Movisport	Volkswagen Polo GTI R5	(Finland) Esapekka Lappi	(Finland) Janne Ferm	2, 4
(Italy) Movisport	Volkswagen Polo GTI R5	(Finland) Teemu Suninen	(Finland) Mikko Markkula	10
(Italy) Movisport	Ford Fiesta Rally2	Nikolay Gryazin	Konstantin Aleksandrov	9
(Italy) Movisport	Ford Fiesta Rally2	(Czech Republic) Erik Cais	(Czech Republic) Jindřiška Žáková	11
(France) Saintéloc Junior Team	Citroën C3 Rally2	(United States) Sean Johnston	(United States) Alex Kihurani	1–2, 5, 7, 9, 11
(France) Saintéloc Junior Team	Citroën C3 Rally2	(Canada) Leonid Urlichich	(United Kingdom) Tom Woodburn	9
(South Korea) Hyundai Motorsport N	Hyundai i20 R5	(Finland) Jari Huttunen	(Finland) Mikko Lukka	2, 5, 7
(South Korea) Hyundai Motorsport N	Hyundai i20 R5	(Norway) Ole Christian Veiby	(Sweden) Jonas Andersson	2, 4–5
(South Korea) Hyundai Motorsport N	Hyundai i20 R5	(Sweden) Oliver Solberg	(Republic of Ireland) Aaron Johnston	4, 7
(South Korea) Hyundai Motorsport N	Hyundai i20 R5	(Italy) Andrea Crugnola	(Italy) Pietro Ometto	5
(South Korea) Hyundai Motorsport N	Hyundai i20 N Rally2	(Finland) Jari Huttunen	(Finland) Mikko Lukka	8, 10–11
(South Korea) Hyundai Motorsport N	Hyundai i20 N Rally2	(Sweden) Oliver Solberg	(Republic of Ireland) Aaron Johnston	8–9
(South Korea) Hyundai Motorsport N	Hyundai i20 N Rally2	(Sweden) Oliver Solberg	(United Kingdom) Craig Drew	10
(South Korea) Hyundai Motorsport N	Hyundai i20 N Rally2	(Finland) Teemu Suninen	(Finland) Mikko Markkula	11
(Estonia) ALM Motorsport	Volkswagen Polo GTI R5	(Estonia) Georg Linnamäe	(Ukraine) Volodymyr Korsia	2, 4
(Estonia) ALM Motorsport	Volkswagen Polo GTI R5	(Estonia) Georg Linnamäe	(Estonia) Tanel Kasesalu	5
(Estonia) ALM Motorsport	Volkswagen Polo GTI R5	(Estonia) Georg Linnamäe	(United Kingdom) James Morgan	7, 10–12
(Estonia) ALM Motorsport	Škoda Fabia Rally2 Evo	(Estonia) Georg Linnamäe	(United Kingdom) James Morgan	9
(Hungary) TRT World Rally Team	Citroën C3 Rally2	(Norway) Mads Østberg	(Norway) Torstein Eriksen	3–5, 7, 9–11

=== In detail ===
M-Sport Ford WRT entered a Ford Fiesta R5 Mk. II for Adrien Fourmaux and Renaud Jamoul, the crew combining their WRC2 campaign with a drive for M-Sport's main team in the WRC. Teemu Suninen and Mikko Markkula joined the WRC2 effort in Croatia, alternating in the car with Fourmaux. Following Suninen leaving M-Sport before the Acropolis Rally, Fourmaux will leave WRC-2 as well to drive the rest of the season in the main category. A second Fiesta was entered for Martin Prokop and Michal Ernst in the Arctic Rally Finland. Ernst was replaced by Viktor Chytka in Portugal, having been originally meant to co-drive for Prokop in Lapland. Zdeněk Jůrka became Prokop's third co-driver of the season in Sardinia. Ernst is due to return to co-drive in Greece. The reigning JWRC champion Tom Kristensson joined the team in Croatia, co-driven by David Arhusiander.

Hyundai Motorsport N signed Oliver Solberg and Aaron Johnston signed for a two-year deal, the pair joining to compete alongside the crew of Ole Christian Veiby and Jonas Andersson. Veiby was however suspended from competing in the WRC for the rest of the year for breaching COVID-19 protocols in Portugal. Reigning WRC-3 champions Jari Huttunen and Mikko Lukka entered driving a third car for the team. Italian driver Andrea Crugnola was meant to drive in Sardinia with co-driver Pietro Ometto, but had to withdraw due to most of the Hyundai WRC-2 team having to quarantine following Portugal. Hyundai introduced a successor to the Hyundai i20 R5 known as the Hyundai i20 N Rally2 in Belgium. Teemu Suninen and Mikko Markkula will join Hyundai WRC-2 ranks for the penultimate round in Spain.

The reigning teams' champions Toksport WRT signed former WRC works driver Andreas Mikkelsen and 2020 WRC-3 runner-up Marco Bulacia Wilkinson, with Ola Fløene and Marcelo Der Ohannesian respectively as co-drivers. Eyvind Brynildsen and Veronica Engan replaced Bulacia Wilkinson and Der Ohannesian for the round in Lapland following the latter crew being prevented from entering the event by visa issues. Elliott Edmondson will replace Fløene as Mikkelsen's co-driver starting from the Acropolis Rally.

Italian team Movisport joined the championship, entering a Volkswagen Polo GTI R5 for Nikolay Gryazin and Konstantin Aleksandrov, who left Hyundai after 2020. The team also entered a Škoda Fabia R5 for Enrico Brazzoli and Maurizio Barone in selected events. Barone was replaced by Danilo Fappani in Sardinia. Esapekka Lappi and Janne Ferm returned to the category, driving a second Volkswagen for Movisport in Lapland and Portugal. Gryazin and Aleksandrov will switch to a Ford Fiesta R5 Mk. II for the Acropolis Rally. After leaving M-Sport Teemu Suninen and Mikko Markkula will drive a Volkswagen for Movisport in Finland.

Portuguese team Sports & You entered a Citroën C3 Rally2 for the French crew of Eric Camilli and François-Xavier Buresi. Camilli was co-driven by Benjamin Veillas in Portugal.

Saintéloc Junior Team joined the championship, entering a Citroën C3 Rally2 for Sean Johnston and Alex Kihurani. The team will enter a second C3 in Greece for Canadian driver Leonid "Crazy Leo" Urlichich and British co-driver Tom Woodburn.

ALM Motorsport entered a Volkswagen Polo GTI R5 for Estonian Georg Linnamäe and Ukrainian Volodymyr Korsia. After being suspended due to breaching COVID-19 protocols, Korsia was replaced with Tanel Kasesalu for one round, before James Morgan became Linnamäe's permanent co-driver. Linnamäe will drive a Škoda Fabia Rally2 Evo in Greece.

2020 WRC-2 champion Mads Østberg entered the 2021 season in Croatia driving a Citroën C3 Rally2 for TRT World Rally Team. He was co-driven by Torstein Eriksen.

== Changes ==
=== Technical regulations ===
Pirelli alone supplied tyres to all teams entering WRC-2 with the removal of Michelin and Yokohama as FIA approved tyre suppliers.

=== Sporting regulations ===
Competitors in the WRC-2 category were awarded Power Stage bonus points for the first time.

== Results and standings ==
=== Season summary ===
Round	Event	Winning driver	Winning co-driver	Winning entrant	Winning time	Report	Ref.
1	(Monaco) Rallye Automobile Monte Carlo	(Norway) Andreas Mikkelsen	(Norway) Ola Fløene	(Germany) Toksport WRT	3:03:57.3	Report	
2	Arctic Rally Finland	(Finland) Esapekka Lappi	(Finland) Janne Ferm	(Italy) Movisport	2:09:56.6	Report	
3	Croatia Rally	(Norway) Mads Østberg	(Norway) Torstein Eriksen	(Hungary) TRT World Rally Team	3:01:23.7	Report	
4	Rally de Portugal	(Finland) Esapekka Lappi	(Finland) Janne Ferm	(Italy) Movisport	3:48:03.4	Report	
5	(Italy) Rally Italia Sardegna	(Finland) Jari Huttunen	(Finland) Mikko Lukka	(South Korea) Hyundai Motorsport N	3:28:58.1	Report	
6	Safari Rally Kenya	No classified finishers				Report	
7	Rally Estonia	(Norway) Andreas Mikkelsen	(Norway) Ola Fløene	(Germany) Toksport WRT	3:01:59.0	Report	
8	Ypres Rally Belgium	(Finland) Jari Huttunen	(Finland) Mikko Lukka	(South Korea) Hyundai Motorsport N	2:51:32.9	Report	
9	Acropolis Rally Greece	(Norway) Andreas Mikkelsen	(United Kingdom) Elliott Edmondson	(Germany) Toksport WRT	3:37:27.1	Report	
10	Rally Finland	(Finland) Teemu Suninen	(Finland) Mikko Markkula	(Italy) Movisport	2:29:05.8	Report	
11	(Spain) RACC Rally Catalunya de España	(France) Eric Camilli	(France) Maxime Vilmot	(Portugal) Sports & You	2:44:01.2	Report	
12	(Italy) Rally Monza	(Finland) Jari Huttunen	(Finland) Mikko Lukka	(United Kingdom) M-Sport Ford WRT	2:49:28.6	Report	

=== Scoring system ===
Points are awarded to the top ten classified finishers in each event. Power Stage points are also awarded in the drivers' and co-drivers' championships. A team has to enter two cars to score points in an event. Drivers and teams must nominate a scoring rally when they enter the event and the best six scores from seven nominated rallies will count towards the final classification. Registered drivers are able to enter additional rallies with Priority 2 status without scoring points.

Position	1st	2nd	3rd	4th	5th	6th	7th	8th	9th	10th
Points	25	18	15	12	10	8	6	4	2	1

=== FIA WRC2 Championship for Drivers ===
Pos.	Driver	MON (Monaco)	ARC (Finland)	CRO (Croatia)	POR (Portugal)	ITA (Italy)	KEN (Kenya)	EST (Estonia)	BEL (Belgium)	GRC (Greece)	FIN (Finland)	ESP (Spain)	MNZ (Italy)	Drops	Points
1	(Norway) Andreas Mikkelsen	1^{1}	2^{1}	5^{1}	WD	Ret	WD	1^{1}		1^{3}			2^{1}	0	149
2	(Norway) Mads Østberg			1^{4}	3^{4}	2^{2}		2^{3}		8^{1}	2^{2}	4^{1}		9	126
3	(Finland) Jari Huttunen		Ret			1^{1}		Ret	1^{1}		3^{3}	Ret	1^{2}	0	107
4	(Bolivia) Marco Bulacia	4^{3}		3^{3}	6^{2}	3^{3}	WD	3^{2}		2^{2}			4^{3}	12	107
5	(Finland) Teemu Suninen			2^{2}	2^{5}		WD		Ret	WD	1^{1}	2^{2}		0	93
6	Nikolay Gryazin		3^{4}	Ret	4			Ret	2^{2}	3^{5}	6^{4}	NC	NC	0	77
7	(Finland) Esapekka Lappi		1^{2}		1^{1}									0	59
8	(France) Eric Camilli	3^{4}			8^{3}							1^{4}		0	51
9	(Czech Republic) Martin Prokop		6		7	4^{4}	Ret			5	4^{5}			0	51
10	(France) Adrien Fourmaux	2^{2}	9^{5}			6^{5}		4^{4}						0	48
11	(Italy) Enrico Brazzoli	6		4^{5}		5							3^{4}	0	48
12	(Estonia) Georg Linnamäe		8		WD	Ret		6		4^{4}	5	6^{5}	NC	0	45
13	(United States) Sean Johnston	5^{5}	7			Ret		Ret		6		5		0	35
14	(Czech Republic) Erik Cais											3^{3}		0	18
15	(Sweden) Tom Kristensson			Ret	9			5^{5}	Ret		Ret			0	13
16	(Norway) Ole Christian Veiby		5^{3}		DNS	WD								0	13
17	(Norway) Eyvind Brynildsen		4											0	12
18	(Sweden) Oliver Solberg				5			Ret	Ret	Ret	Ret			0	10
19	(Canada) Leonid Urlichich									7				0	6
Pos.	Driver	MON (Monaco)	ARC (Finland)	CRO (Croatia)	POR (Portugal)	ITA (Italy)	KEN (Kenya)	EST (Estonia)	BEL (Belgium)	GRC (Greece)	FIN (Finland)	ESP (Spain)	MNZ (Italy)	Drops	Points

Key
Colour	Result
Gold	Winner
Silver	2nd place
Bronze	3rd place
Green	Points finish
Blue	Non-points finish
Blue	Non-classified finish (NC)
Purple	Did not finish (Ret)
Black	Excluded (EX)
Black	Disqualified (DSQ)
White	Did not start (DNS)
White	Cancelled (C)
Blank	Withdrew entry from the event (WD)

Notes:
^{1 2 3 4 5} – Power Stage position

=== FIA WRC2 Championship for Co-Drivers ===
Pos.	Co-Driver	MON (Monaco)	ARC (Finland)	CRO (Croatia)	POR (Portugal)	ITA (Italy)	KEN (Kenya)	EST (Estonia)	BEL (Belgium)	GRC (Greece)	FIN (Finland)	ESP (Spain)	MNZ (Italy)	Drops	Points
1	(Norway) Torstein Eriksen			1^{4}	3^{4}	2^{2}		2^{3}		8^{1}	2^{2}	4^{1}		9	126
2	(Finland) Mikko Lukka		Ret			1^{1}		Ret	1^{1}		3^{3}	Ret	1^{2}	0	107
3	(Argentina) Marcelo Der Ohannesian	4^{3}		3^{3}	6^{2}	3^{3}	WD	3^{2}		2^{2}			5^{3}	10	105
4	(Norway) Ola Fløene	1^{1}	2^{1}	5^{1}	WD	Ret	WD	1^{1}						0	98
5	(Finland) Mikko Markkula			2^{2}	2^{5}		WD		Ret	WD	1^{1}	2^{2}		0	93
6	Konstantin Aleksandrov		3^{4}	Ret	4			Ret	2^{2}	3^{5}	6^{4}	NC	NC	0	77
7	(Finland) Janne Ferm		1^{2}		1^{1}									0	59
8	(United Kingdom) James Morgan							6		4^{4}	5	6^{5}	3^{4}	0	58
9	(Belgium) Renaud Jamoul	2^{2}	9^{5}			6^{5}		4^{4}						0	48
10	(United States) Alex Kihurani	5^{5}	7			Ret		Ret		6		5		0	35
11	(Czech Republic) Michal Ernst		6							5	4^{5}			0	31
12	(United Kingdom) Elliott Edmondson									1^{3}				0	28
13	(France) Maxime Vilmot											1^{4}		0	27
14	(United Kingdom) Phil Hall												2^{1}	0	23
15	(Italy) Maurizio Barone	6		4^{5}										0	21
16	(Czech Republic) Jindřiška Žáková											3^{3}		0	18
17	(France) François-Xavier Buresi	3^{4}										WD		0	17
18	(Czech Republic) Zdeněk Jůrka					4^{4}	Ret							0	14
19	(Italy) Manuel Fenoli												4^{5}	0	13
20	(Sweden) David Arhusiander			Ret	9			5^{5}	Ret		Ret			0	13
21	(Sweden) Jonas Andersson		5^{3}		DNS	WD								0	13
22	(Norway) Veronica Engan		4											0	12
23	(Republic of Ireland) Aaron Johnston				5			Ret	Ret	Ret				0	10
24	(Italy) Danilo Fappani					5								0	10
25	(France) Benjamin Veillas				8^{3}									0	7
26	(Czech Republic) Viktor Chytka				7									0	6
27	(United Kingdom) Tom Woodburn									7				0	6
28	(Ukraine) Volodymyr Korsia		8		WD									0	4
Pos.	Co-Driver	MON (Monaco)	ARC (Finland)	CRO (Croatia)	POR (Portugal)	ITA (Italy)	KEN (Kenya)	EST (Estonia)	BEL (Belgium)	GRC (Greece)	FIN (Finland)	ESP (Spain)	MNZ (Italy)	Drops	Points

Key
Colour	Result
Gold	Winner
Silver	2nd place
Bronze	3rd place
Green	Points finish
Blue	Non-points finish
Blue	Non-classified finish (NC)
Purple	Did not finish (Ret)
Black	Excluded (EX)
Black	Disqualified (DSQ)
White	Did not start (DNS)
White	Cancelled (C)
Blank	Withdrew entry from the event (WD)

Notes:
^{1 2 3 4 5} – Power Stage position

=== FIA WRC2 Championship for Teams ===
Pos.	Team	MON (Monaco)	ARC (Finland)	CRO (Croatia)	POR (Portugal)	ITA (Italy)	KEN (Kenya)	EST (Estonia)	BEL (Belgium)	GRC (Greece)	FIN (Finland)	ESP (Spain)	MNZ (Italy)	Drops	Points
1	(Italy) Movisport	2	1	3	1	NC		Ret	NC	NC	1	1	1	15	227
1	(Italy) Movisport	4	3	Ret	3						4	3	3	15	227
2	(Germany) Toksport WRT	1	2	2	NC	1	WD	1		1		NC	2	25	216
2	(Germany) Toksport WRT	3	4	4	WD	Ret	WD	2		2			4	25	216
3	(United Kingdom) M-Sport Ford WRT	NC	5	1	2	2	Ret	3	Ret	NC	3		NC	0	146
3	(United Kingdom) M-Sport Ford WRT		6	Ret	5	3	WD	4	Ret	WD	Ret			0	146
4	(South Korea) Hyundai Motorsport N		NC		4	NC		Ret	1	Ret	2	2		0	73
4	(South Korea) Hyundai Motorsport N		Ret		DNS	WD		Ret	Ret		Ret	Ret		0	73
5	(France) Saintéloc Junior Team	NC	NC			Ret		Ret		3		NC		0	27
5	(France) Saintéloc Junior Team									4				0	27
Pos.	Team	MON (Monaco)	ARC (Finland)	CRO (Croatia)	POR (Portugal)	ITA (Italy)	KEN (Kenya)	EST (Estonia)	BEL (Belgium)	GRC (Greece)	FIN (Finland)	ESP (Spain)	MNZ (Italy)	Drops	Points

Key
Colour	Result
Gold	Winner
Silver	2nd place
Bronze	3rd place
Green	Points finish
Blue	Non-points finish
Blue	Non-classified finish (NC)
Purple	Did not finish (Ret)
Black	Excluded (EX)
Black	Disqualified (DSQ)
White	Did not start (DNS)
White	Cancelled (C)
Blank	Withdrew entry from the event (WD)

Notes:
^{1 2 3 4 5} – Power Stage position
