= Movisport =

Motorsport team

Movisport is a rally team and marketing agency based in Reggio Emilia, Italy. The rally team, Scuderia Campione Movisport competes in the Italian national championship, the European Rally Championship and the World Rally Championship (WRC), and in 2021, won the Teams championship title of the support series, WRC2. The marketing agency provides advertising and promotion services linking brands with racing drivers and teams. The rally team's accomplishments therefore include those of the drivers and teams the marketing agency has worked with.

== History ==
The team was founded in 1999 by Italian Zelindo Melegari primarily for his own rally driving purposes but other drivers were soon to join him in the team. Giandomenico Basso was driving for Movisport as early as 2001 on occasion and, as an agency partner in 2006, he won both the European Rally Championship and Intercontinental Rally Challenge, followed up in 2009 with another ERC win and the Italian National championship in 2016.

In 2018 Nikolay Gryazin won ERC Junior title whilst a partner of the agency but never entered in a rally by the team. In 2020, Movisport claimed to be the Italian Rally Champions winning team for the sixth year in a row, although it's not clear from results what and how they achieved this.

=== WRC2 ===
Their WRC2 Teams' Championship win in 2021 was a result of direct entries under the Movisport name, utilising the services of drivers Nikolay Gryazin, Esapekka Lappi, Teemu Suninen, Erik Cais and Enrico Brazzoli. Not loyal to any one manufacturer, the team used four models from three makes across the season: Škoda Fabia R5, Škoda Fabia Rally2 evo, Volkswagen Polo GTI R5 and Ford Fiesta Rally2. The WRC2 rules in 2021 insisted drivers must be entered by a team. In reality Gryazin owns and ran his own Volkswagen Polo, and Cais' team provided their Fiesta, obscuring the distinction between Movisport being the entrant or an entry vehicle for independent runners. Although operating in a different fashion, Movisport beat manufacturer teams from M-Sport and Hyundai, and also the reigning champions Toksport.
