= 2021 Junior WRC Championship =

Championship

The 2021 FIA Junior WRC Championship was the ninth season of Junior WRC, a rallying championship governed by the Fédération Internationale de l'Automobile, running in support of the World Rally Championship. The championship was open to drivers under the age of thirty—although no such restriction existed for co-drivers—competing in identical one-litre Ford Fiesta R2s built and maintained by M-Sport. The championship began in April 2021 at the Croatia Rally.

Tom Kristensson and Joakim Sjöberg were the defending drivers' and co-drivers' champions while Sweden was the defending Nations' Trophy winner. Sami Pajari and Marko Salminen became the first Finnish crew to win the championship. Finland took the Nations' Trophy victory.

The FIA Junior WRC Championship titles were not awarded in 2022, with WRC3 Junior titles taking their place. However, FIA Junior WRC titles would make a return in 2023.

== Calendar ==
The following events were included in the 2021 Junior WRC Championship. Each event was taken from the 2021 World Rally Championship calendar.

Round	Start date	Finish date	Rally	Rally headquarters	Surface	Stages	Distance	Ref.
1	22 April	25 April	Croatia Rally	Zagreb, City of Zagreb Region	Tarmac	20	300.32 km	
2	20 May	23 May	Rally de Portugal	Matosinhos, Porto	Gravel	20	337.51 km	
3	15 July	18 July	Rally Estonia	Tartu, Tartu County	Gravel	24	319.38 km	
4	13 August	15 August	Ypres Rally Belgium	Ypres, West Flanders	Tarmac	20	295.78 km	
5	14 October	17 October	(Spain) RACC Rally Catalunya de España	Salou, Catalonia	Tarmac	19	306.50 km	

=== Calendar changes ===
Rally Croatia made its championship début. The Ypres Rally also made its début, replacing Rally GB. Rally Catalunya returned to the schedule after being removed from the 2020 calendar before the COVID-19 pandemic disrupted the championship. Rally Italia Sardegna was removed from the calendar. Rally Sweden was omitted from the Junior WRC Championship calendar before it was removed from the wider World Rally Championship schedule. The Rally Monza was also removed from the calendar as it was only included on the 2020 schedule in response to the pandemic.

== Entries ==
The following crews competed in the championship:

Entrant	Driver	Co-driver	Rounds
(Finland) Team Flying Finn	(Finland) Lauri Joona	(Finland) Ari Koponen	1–2
(Finland) Team Flying Finn	(Finland) Lauri Joona	(Finland) Mikael Korhonen	3–5
(Latvia) LMT Autosporta Akademija	(Latvia) Mārtiņš Sesks	(Latvia) Renārs Francis	All
(Finland) Porvoon Autopalvelu	(Finland) Sami Pajari	(Finland) Marko Salminen	All
Autosport Team Estonia	(Estonia) Robert Virves	(Estonia) Sander Pruul	1–3
Autosport Team Estonia	(Estonia) Robert Virves	(Estonia) Aleks Lesk	4–5
(Romania) Raul Badiu	(Romania) Raul Badiu	(Romania) Rareș Fetean	1–3
(United Kingdom) Jon Armstrong	(United Kingdom) Jon Armstrong	(United Kingdom) Phil Hall	All
(Czech Republic) Styllex Motorsport	(Slovakia) Martin Koči	(Czech Republic) Petr Těšínský	1–3
(Republic of Ireland) Motorsport Ireland Rally Academy	(Republic of Ireland) William Creighton	(Republic of Ireland) Liam Regan	All

== Results and standing ==
=== Season summary ===
Round	Event	Winning driver	Winning co-driver	Winning time	Report	Ref.
1	Croatia Rally	(United Kingdom) Jon Armstrong	(United Kingdom) Phil Hall	3:15:07.6	Report	
2	Rally de Portugal	(Latvia) Mārtiņš Sesks	(Latvia) Renārs Francis	4:15:52.7	Report	
3	Rally Estonia	(Finland) Sami Pajari	(Finland) Marko Salminen	3:19:03.2	Report	
4	Ypres Rally Belgium	(United Kingdom) Jon Armstrong	(United Kingdom) Phil Hall	2:51:55.4	Report	
5	(Spain) RACC Rally Catalunya de España	(Finland) Sami Pajari	(Finland) Marko Salminen	2:58:02.5	Report	

=== Scoring system ===
Points were awarded to the top ten classified finishers. An additional point was given for every stage win. The best four results out of five counted towards the final drivers’ and co-drivers’ standings. However, all points gained from stage wins were retained. Double points were awarded for drivers' championship at the season's finale.

Position	1st	2nd	3rd	4th	5th	6th	7th	8th	9th	10th
Points	25	18	15	12	10	8	6	4	2	1

=== FIA Junior WRC Championship for Drivers ===
Pos.	Driver	CRO (Croatia)	POR (Portugal)	EST (Estonia)	BEL (Belgium)	ESP (Spain)	Total Points	Best 4
1	(Finland) Sami Pajari	6^{9}	2^{2}	1^{9}	2^{2}	1^{4}	145	137
2	(United Kingdom) Jon Armstrong	1^{2}	Ret^{6}	2^{5}	1^{7}	4^{7}	119	119
3	(Latvia) Mārtiņš Sesks	2	1^{3}	3^{6}	6^{2}	6	93	85
4	(Finland) Lauri Joona	3^{1}	6^{4}	4	4	2	88	80
5	(Estonia) Robert Virves	7	3	7	3	3^{5}	78	71
6	(Republic of Ireland) William Creighton	5	5	6	5^{7}	5^{1}	66	58
7	(Slovakia) Martin Koči	4^{3}	4^{4}	Ret^{3}			34	34
8	(Romania) Raul Badiu	8^{3}	Ret	5			17	17
Pos.	Driver	CRO (Croatia)	POR (Portugal)	EST (Estonia)	BEL (Belgium)	ESP (Spain)	Total Points	Best 4

Key
Colour	Result
Gold	Winner
Silver	2nd place
Bronze	3rd place
Green	Points finish
Blue	Non-points finish
Blue	Non-classified finish (NC)
Purple	Did not finish (Ret)
Black	Excluded (EX)
Black	Disqualified (DSQ)
White	Did not start (DNS)
White	Cancelled (C)
Blank	Withdrew entry from the event (WD)

=== FIA Junior WRC Championship for Co-Drivers ===
Pos.	Co-Driver	CRO (Croatia)	POR (Portugal)	EST (Estonia)	BEL (Belgium)	ESP (Spain)	Total Points	Best 4
1	(Finland) Marko Salminen	6^{9}	2^{2}	1^{9}	2^{2}	1^{4}	120	112
2	(United Kingdom) Phil Hall	1^{2}	Ret^{6}	2^{5}	1^{7}	4^{7}	107	107
3	(Latvia) Renārs Francis	2	1^{3}	3^{6}	6^{2}	6	85	77
4	(Republic of Ireland) Liam Regan	5	5	6	5^{7}	5^{1}	56	48
5	(Finland) Mikael Korhonen			4	4	2	42	42
6	(Estonia) Aleks Lesk				3	3^{5}	35	35
7	(Czech Republic) Petr Těšínský	4^{3}	4^{4}	Ret^{3}			34	34
8	(Finland) Ari Koponen	3^{1}	6^{4}				28	28
9	(Estonia) Sander Pruul	7	3	7			27	27
10	(Romania) Rareș Fetean	8^{3}	Ret	5			17	17
Pos.	Co-Driver	CRO (Croatia)	POR (Portugal)	EST (Estonia)	BEL (Belgium)	ESP (Spain)	Total Points	Best 4

Key
Colour	Result
Gold	Winner
Silver	2nd place
Bronze	3rd place
Green	Points finish
Blue	Non-points finish
Blue	Non-classified finish (NC)
Purple	Did not finish (Ret)
Black	Excluded (EX)
Black	Disqualified (DSQ)
White	Did not start (DNS)
White	Cancelled (C)
Blank	Withdrew entry from the event (WD)

=== FIA Junior WRC Trophy for Nations ===
Pos.	Co-Driver	CRO (Croatia)	POR (Portugal)	EST (Estonia)	BEL (Belgium)	ESP (Spain)	Points
1	Finland	3	2	1	2	1	101
2	United Kingdom	1	Ret	2	1	3	83
3	Latvia	2	1	3	5	5	78
4	Estonia	6	3	6	3	2	64
5	Ireland	5	5	5	4	4	54
6	Slovakia	4	4	Ret			24
7	Romania	7	Ret	4			18
Pos.	Co-Driver	CRO (Croatia)	POR (Portugal)	EST (Estonia)	BEL (Belgium)	ESP (Spain)	Points

Key
Colour	Result
Gold	Winner
Silver	2nd place
Bronze	3rd place
Green	Points finish
Blue	Non-points finish
Blue	Non-classified finish (NC)
Purple	Did not finish (Ret)
Black	Excluded (EX)
Black	Disqualified (DSQ)
White	Did not start (DNS)
White	Cancelled (C)
Blank	Withdrew entry from the event (WD)
