= Renārs Francis =

Latvian rally co-driver (born 1978)

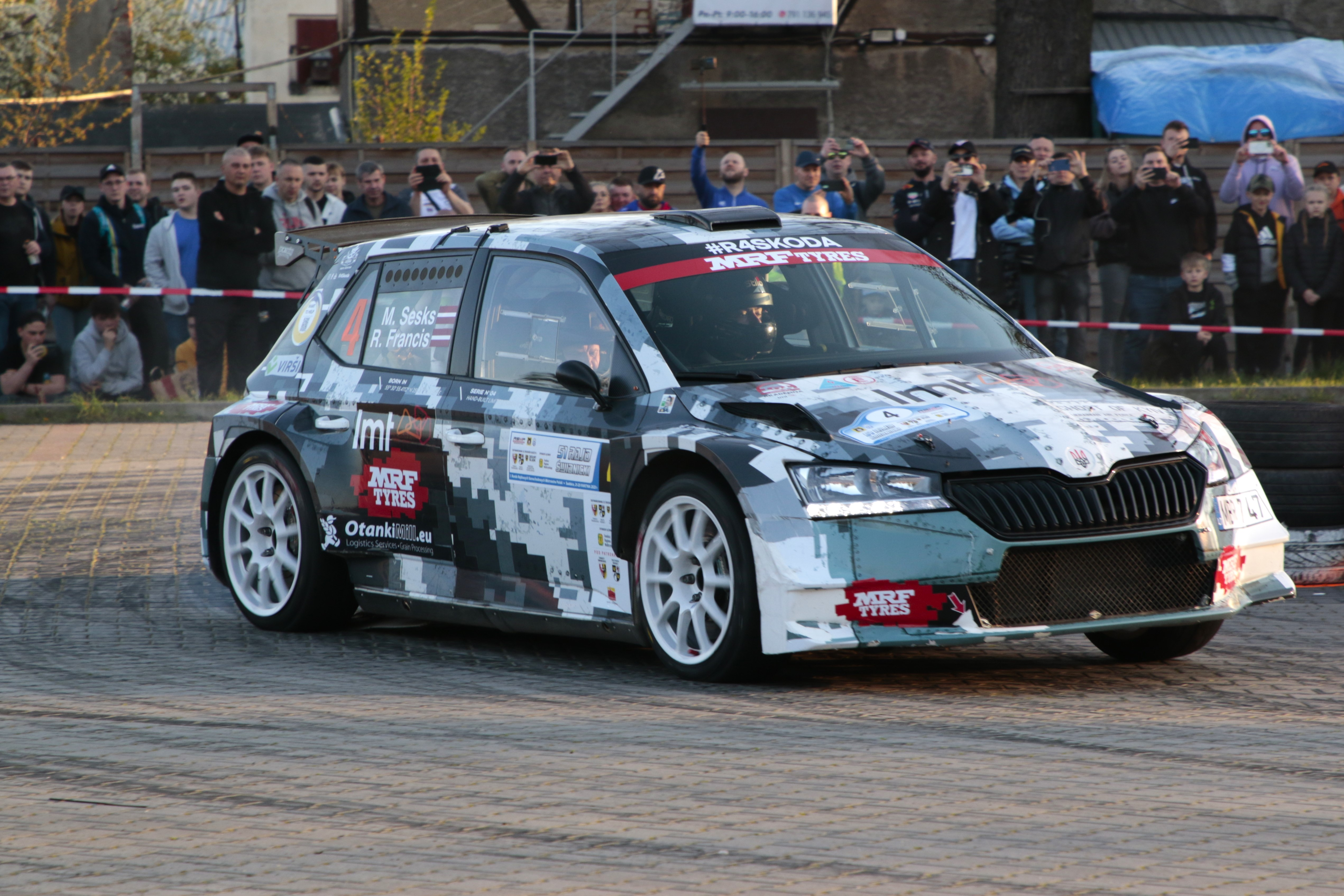

Personal information
- Nationality: (Latvia) Latvian
- Born: 20 December 1978 (age 47)

World Rally Championship record
- Years active: 2018–2021, 2024–present
- Driver: (Latvia) Mārtiņš Sesks
- Teams: M-Sport Ford WRT
- Rallies: 18
- Championships: 0
- Rally wins: 0
- Podiums: 0
- Stage wins: 2
- Total points: 30
- First rally: 2018 Rally Deutschland
- Last rally: 2025 Rally Sweden

Renārs Francis (born 20 December 1978) is a Latvian rally co-driver.

== Biography ==
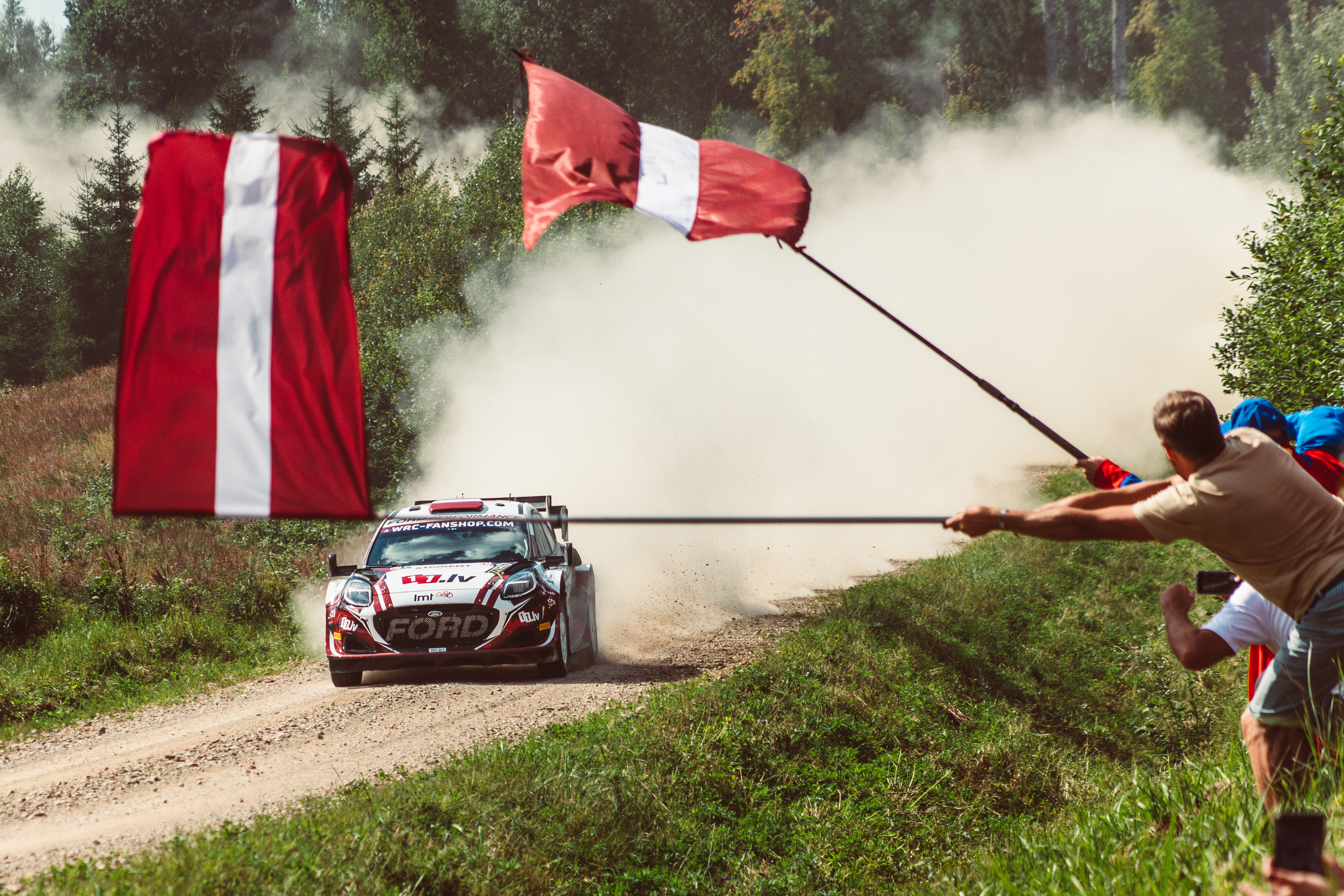
Mārtiņš Sesks at World Rally Championship 2024's Latvia SS13 Track at KM 4.3

Francis made his WRC debut with Mārtiņš Sesks at the 2018 Rally Deutschland, and top tier debut in 2024, competing for M-Sport Ford WRT. They were contracted to contest six rounds with the team in 2025.

== Rally results ==
=== WRC results ===
Year	Entrant	Car	1	2	3	4	5	6	7	8	9	10	11	12	13	14	Pos.	Points
2018	Mārtiņš Sesks	Opel Adam R2	MON	SWE	MEX	FRA	ARG	POR	ITA	FIN	GER; 36	TUR	GBR	ESP	AUS		NC	0
2019	LMT Autosporta Akadēmija	Ford Fiesta R2T19	MON	SWE; 36	MEX	FRA; Ret	ARG	CHL	POR	ITA; 25	FIN; 42	GER	TUR	GBR	ESP	AUS; C	NC	0
2020	LMT Autosporta Akadēmija	Ford Fiesta Rally4	MON	SWE; 27	MEX	EST; 28	TUR	ITA; 34	MNZ; Ret								NC	0
2021	LMT Autosporta Akadēmija	Ford Fiesta Rally4	MON	ARC	CRO; 19	POR; 25	ITA	KEN	EST; 23	BEL; 58	GRE	FIN	ESP; 48	MNZ			NC	0
2024	M-Sport Ford WRT	Ford Puma Rally1	MON	SWE	KEN	CRO	POR	ITA	POL; 5	LAT; 7	FIN	GRE	CHL; 24	EUR	JPN		15th	22
2025	M-Sport Ford WRT	Ford Puma Rally1	MON	SWE; 6	KEN	ESP	POR	ITA	GRE	EST	FIN	PAR	CHL	EUR	JPN	SAU	10th*	8*

* Season still in progress.
