= 2021 Rally Estonia =

11th edition of Rally Estonia

2021 Rally Estonia Rally Estonia 2021
Round 7 of 12 in the 2021 World Rally Championship
← Previous event	Next event →
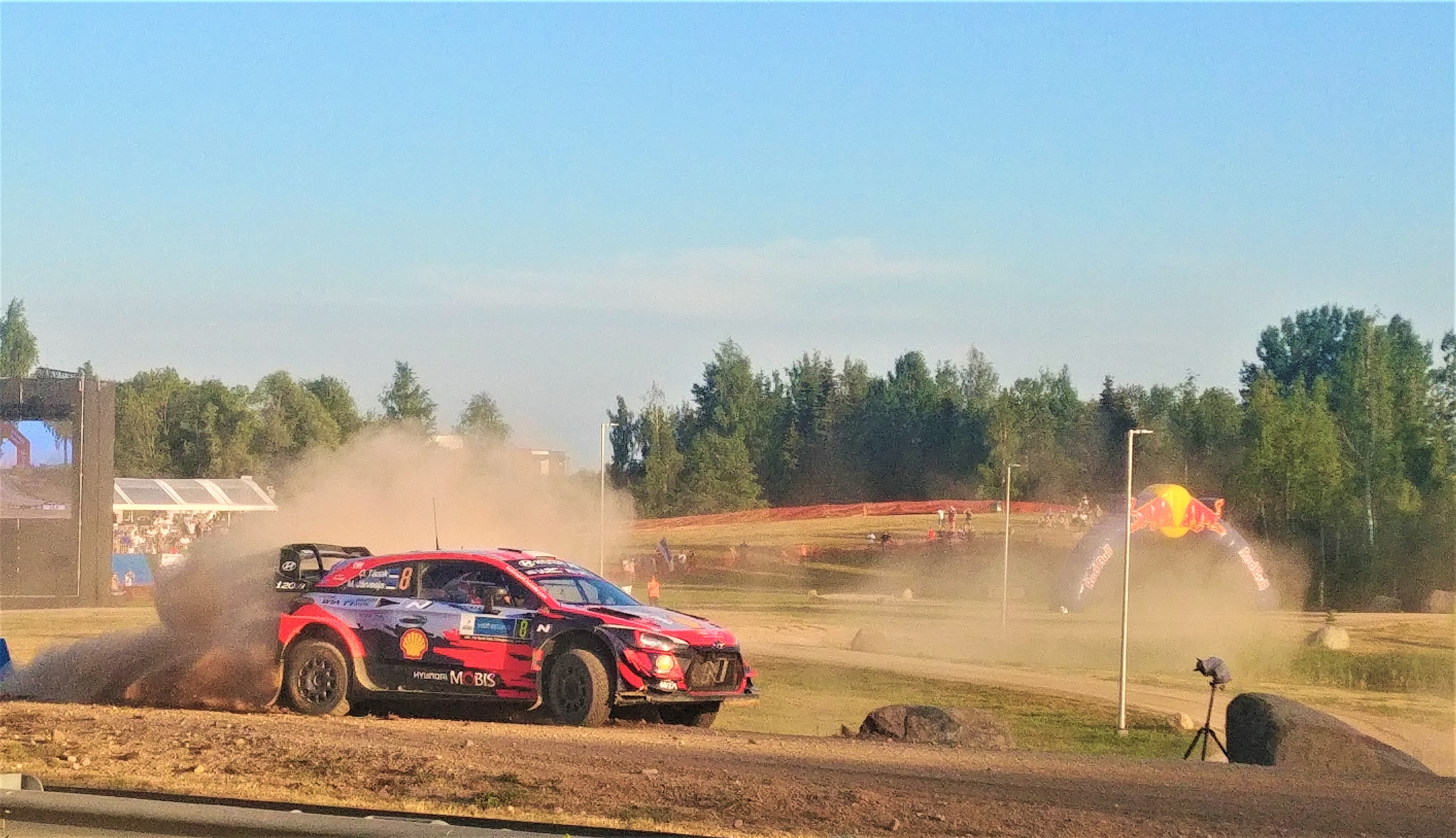
- Ott Tänak and Martin Järveoja driving a Hyundai i20 Coupe WRC during the rally.
- Host country: Estonia
- Rally base: Tartu, Tartu County
- Dates run: 15 – 18 July 2021
- Start location: Tartu, Tartu County
- Finish location: Tartu Parish, Tartu County
- Stages: 24 (319.38 km; 198.45 miles)
- Stage surface: Gravel
- Transport distance: 933.77 km (580.22 miles)
- Overall distance: 1,253.15 km (778.67 miles)

Statistics
- Crews registered: 49
- Crews: 49 at start, 38 at finish

Overall results
- Overall winner: (Finland) Kalle Rovanperä (Finland) Jonne Halttunen (Japan) Toyota Gazoo Racing WRT; 2:51:29.1
- Power Stage winner: (Estonia) Ott Tänak (Estonia) Martin Järveoja (South Korea) Hyundai Shell Mobis WRT; 5:52.2

Support category results
- WRC-2 winner: (Norway) Andreas Mikkelsen (Norway) Ola Fløene (Germany) Toksport WRT; 3:01:59.0
- WRC-3 winner: Aleksey Lukyanuk; Yaroslav Fedorov; 3:01:45.2
- J-WRC winner: (Finland) Sami Pajari (Finland) Marko Salminen (Finland) Porvoon Autopalvelu; 3:19:03.2

The 2021 Rally Estonia (also known as the Rally Estonia 2021) was a motor racing event for rally cars that was held over four days between 15 and 18 July 2021. It marked the eleventh running of the Rally Estonia. The event was the seventh round of the 2021 World Rally Championship, World Rally Championship-2 and World Rally Championship-3. It was also the third round of the 2021 Junior World Rally Championship. The 2021 event was based in the town of Tartu in Tartu County and contested over twenty-four special stages totalling 319.38 km (198.45 mi) in competitive distance.

Ott Tänak and Martin Järveoja were the defending rally winners. Their team, Hyundai Shell Mobis WRT, were the defending manufacturers' winners. Mads Østberg and Torstein Eriksen were the defending winners in the WRC-2 category. In the WRC-3 category, Oliver Solberg and Aaron Johnston were the reigning rally winners, but they did not defend their titles as they were promoted to higher classes by Hyundai Motorsport. In the junior category, Mārtiņš Sesks and Renārs Francis were the defending winners.

Kalle Rovanperä and Jonne Halttunen won the rally, the first of their careers. At the age of twenty, Rovanperä became the youngest driver to win a WRC event. Their team, Toyota Gazoo Racing WRT, were the manufacturer's winners. Andreas Mikkelsen and Ola Fløene won the World Rally Championship-2 category, while Aleksey Lukyanuk and Yaroslav Fedorov won the World Rally Championship-3 category. The Finnish crew of Sami Pajari and Marko Salminen was the winner in the junior class.

== Background ==
=== Championship standings prior to the event ===
Reigning World Champions Sébastien Ogier and Julien Ingrassia entered the round with a thirty-four-point lead over Elfyn Evans and Scott Martin. Thierry Neuville and Martijn Wydaeghe were third, a further twenty-two points behind. In the World Rally Championship for Manufacturers, Toyota Gazoo Racing WRT held a massive fifty-nine-point lead over defending manufacturers' champions Hyundai Shell Mobis WRT, followed by M-Sport Ford WRT.

In the World Rally Championship-2 standings, Andreas Mikkelsen and Ola Fløene held a two-point lead ahead of Mads Østberg and Torstein Eriksen in the drivers' and co-drivers' standings respectively, with Marco Bulacia Wilkinson and Marcelo Der Ohannesian in third. In the teams' championship, Movisport and Toksport WRT co-leading the championship, with M-Sport Ford WRT in third.

In the World Rally Championship-3 standings, Yohan Rossel and Alexandre Coria led drivers' and co-drivers' championship respectively. Kajetan Kajetanowicz and Maciek Szczepaniak were second, trailed by Nicolas Ciamin and Yannick Roche.

In the junior championship, Mārtiņš Sesks and Renars Francis led Sami Pajari and Marko Salminen by nine points. Jon Armstrong and Phil Hall were third, four points further back. In the Nations' standings, Latvia held a ten-point lead over Finland, with United Kingdom in third.

=== Entry list ===
The following crews were set to enter the rally. The event was open to crews competing in the World Rally Championship, its support categories, the World Rally Championship-2 and World Rally Championship-3, Junior World Rally Championship and privateer entries that were not registered to score points in any championship. Ten entries for the World Rally Championship were received, as were ten in the World Rally Championship-2 and fourteen in the World Rally Championship-3. A further eight crews were set to enter the Junior World Rally Championship in Ford Fiesta Rally4s.

Rally1 entries competing in the World Rally Championship
No.	Driver	Co-Driver	Entrant	Car	Tyre
1	(France) Sébastien Ogier	(France) Julien Ingrassia	(Japan) Toyota Gazoo Racing WRT	Toyota Yaris WRC	P
3	(Finland) Teemu Suninen	(Finland) Mikko Markkula	(United Kingdom) M-Sport Ford WRT	Ford Fiesta WRC	P
7	(France) Pierre-Louis Loubet	(France) Florian Haut-Labourdette	(France) Hyundai 2C Competition	Hyundai i20 Coupe WRC	P
8	(Estonia) Ott Tänak	(Estonia) Martin Järveoja	(South Korea) Hyundai Shell Mobis WRT	Hyundai i20 Coupe WRC	P
11	(Belgium) Thierry Neuville	(Belgium) Martijn Wydaeghe	(South Korea) Hyundai Shell Mobis WRT	Hyundai i20 Coupe WRC	P
18	(Japan) Takamoto Katsuta	(United Kingdom) Daniel Barritt	(Japan) Toyota Gazoo Racing WRT	Toyota Yaris WRC	P
33	(United Kingdom) Elfyn Evans	(United Kingdom) Scott Martin	(Japan) Toyota Gazoo Racing WRT	Toyota Yaris WRC	P
42	(Republic of Ireland) Craig Breen	(Republic of Ireland) Paul Nagle	(South Korea) Hyundai Shell Mobis WRT	Hyundai i20 Coupe WRC	P
44	(United Kingdom) Gus Greensmith	(Republic of Ireland) Chris Patterson	(United Kingdom) M-Sport Ford WRT	Ford Fiesta WRC	P
69	(Finland) Kalle Rovanperä	(Finland) Jonne Halttunen	(Japan) Toyota Gazoo Racing WRT	Toyota Yaris WRC	P

Rally2 entries competing in the World Rally Championship-2
No.	Driver	Co-Driver	Entrant	Car	Tyre
20	(Norway) Andreas Mikkelsen	(Norway) Ola Fløene	(Germany) Toksport WRT	Škoda Fabia R5 Evo	P
21	(Norway) Mads Østberg	(Norway) Torstein Eriksen	(Hungary) TRT World Rally Team	Citroën C3 Rally2	P
22	(Bolivia) Marco Bulacia Wilkinson	(Argentina) Marcelo Der Ohannesian	(Germany) Toksport WRT	Škoda Fabia R5 Evo	P
23	(France) Adrien Fourmaux	(Belgium) Renaud Jamoul	(United Kingdom) M-Sport Ford WRT	Ford Fiesta R5 Mk. II	P
24	(Finland) Jari Huttunen	(Finland) Mikko Lukka	(South Korea) Hyundai Motorsport N	Hyundai i20 R5	P
25	Nikolay Gryazin (Note: Nikolay Gryazin is Russian, but he competes as a neutral competitor using the designation RAF (Russian Automobile Federation), as the Court of Arbitration for Sport upheld a ban on Russia competing at World Championships. The ban was implemented by the World Anti-Doping Agency in response to state-sponsored doping program of Russian athletes.)	Konstantin Aleksandrov (Note: Konstantin Aleksandrov is Russian, but he competes as a neutral competitor using the designation RAF (Russian Automobile Federation), as the Court of Arbitration for Sport upheld a ban on Russia competing at World Championships. The ban was implemented by the World Anti-Doping Agency in response to state-sponsored doping program of Russian athletes.)	(Italy) Movisport	Volkswagen Polo GTI R5	P
26	(United States) Sean Johnston	(United States) Alex Kihurani	(France) Saintéloc Junior Team	Citroën C3 Rally2	P
27	(Sweden) Oliver Solberg	(Republic of Ireland) Aaron Johnston	(South Korea) Hyundai Motorsport N	Hyundai i20 R5	P
28	(Estonia) Georg Linnamäe	(United Kingdom) James Morgan	(Estonia) ALM Motorsport	Volkswagen Polo GTI R5	P
29	(Sweden) Tom Kristensson	(Sweden) David Arhusiander	(United Kingdom) M-Sport Ford WRT	Ford Fiesta R5 Mk. II	P

Rally2 entries competing in the World Rally Championship-3 (Note: Under the Sporting Regulations, each car competing in the World Rally Championship-3 is entered under the driver's name.)
No.	Driver	Co-Driver	Entrant	Car	Tyre
30	(Poland) Kajetan Kajetanowicz	(Poland) Maciej Szczepaniak	(Poland) Kajetan Kajetanowicz	Škoda Fabia R5 Evo	P
31	(Estonia) Egon Kaur	(Estonia) Silver Simm	(Estonia) Kaur Motorsport	Volkswagen Polo GTI R5	P
32	(Paraguay) Fabrizio Zaldívar	(Spain) Carlos del Barrio	(Paraguay) Fabrizio Zaldívar	Škoda Fabia R5 Evo	P
34	(Finland) Emil Lindholm	(Finland) Reeta Hämäläinen	(Finland) Emil Lindholm	Škoda Fabia R5 Evo	P
35	(Spain) Pepe López	(Spain) Borja Odriozola	(Spain) Pepe López	Škoda Fabia R5 Evo	P
36	(Finland) Mikko Heikkilä	(Finland) Topi Luhtinen	(Finland) Mikko Heikkilä	Škoda Fabia R5 Evo	P
37	(Chile) Emilio Fernández	(Argentina) Rubén García	(Chile) Emilio Fernández	Škoda Fabia R5 Evo	P
38	Aleksey Lukyanuk (Note: Aleksey Lukyanuk is Russian, but he competes as a neutral competitor using the designation RAF (Russian Automobile Federation), as the Court of Arbitration for Sport upheld a ban on Russia competing at World Championships. The ban was implemented by the World Anti-Doping Agency in response to state-sponsored doping program of Russian athletes.)	Yaroslav Fedorov (Note: Yaroslav Fedorov is Russian, but he competes as a neutral competitor using the designation RAF (Russian Automobile Federation), as the Court of Arbitration for Sport upheld a ban on Russia competing at World Championships. The ban was implemented by the World Anti-Doping Agency in response to state-sponsored doping program of Russian athletes.)	Aleksey Lukyanuk	Škoda Fabia R5 Evo	P
39	(Estonia) Raul Jeets	(Estonia) Andrus Toom	(Estonia) Raul Jeets	Škoda Fabia R5 Evo	P
40	(Estonia) Priit Koik	(Estonia) Kristo Tamm	(Estonia) Priit Koik	Ford Fiesta R5 Mk. II	P
41	(Lithuania) Vladas Jurkevičius	(Lithuania) Aisvydas Paliukėnas	(Lithuania) Vladas Jurkevičius	Škoda Fabia R5 Evo	P
43	(Saudi Arabia) Rakan Al-Rashed	(Finland) Antti Haapala	(Saudi Arabia) Rakan Al-Rashed	Volkswagen Polo GTI R5	P
45	Radik Shaymiev (Note: Radik Shaymiev is Russian, but he competes as a neutral competitor using the designation RAF (Russian Automobile Federation), as the Court of Arbitration for Sport upheld a ban on Russia competing at World Championships. The ban was implemented by the World Anti-Doping Agency in response to state-sponsored doping program of Russian athletes.)	Maxim Tsvetkov (Note: Maxim Tsvetkov is Russian, but he competes as a neutral competitor using the designation RAF (Russian Automobile Federation), as the Court of Arbitration for Sport upheld a ban on Russia competing at World Championships. The ban was implemented by the World Anti-Doping Agency in response to state-sponsored doping program of Russian athletes.)	Radik Shaymiev	Hyundai i20 R5	P
46	(Spain) Miguel Díaz-Aboitiz	(Spain) Diego Sanjuan de Eusebio	(Spain) Miguel Díaz-Aboitiz	Škoda Fabia R5 Evo	P

Rally4 entries competing in the Junior World Rally Championship
No.	Driver	Co-Driver	Entrant	Car	Tyre
47	(Latvia) Mārtiņš Sesks	(Latvia) Renārs Francis	(Latvia) LMT Autosporta Akademija	Ford Fiesta Rally4	P
48	(Finland) Sami Pajari	(Finland) Marko Salminen	(Finland) Porvoon Autopalvelu	Ford Fiesta Rally4	P
49	(United Kingdom) Jon Armstrong	(United Kingdom) Phil Hall	(United Kingdom) Jon Armstrong	Ford Fiesta Rally4	P
50	(Slovakia) Martin Koči	(Czech Republic) Petr Těšínský	(Slovakia) Styllex Motorsport	Ford Fiesta Rally4	P
51	(Finland) Lauri Joona	(Finland) Mikael Korhonen	(Finland) Team Flying Finn	Ford Fiesta Rally4	P
52	(Estonia) Robert Virves	(Estonia) Sander Pruul	Autosport Team Estonia	Ford Fiesta Rally4	P
53	(Romania) Raul Badiu	(Romania) Rareș Fetean	(Romania) Raul Badiu	Ford Fiesta Rally4	P
54	(Republic of Ireland) William Creighton	(Republic of Ireland) Liam Regan	(Republic of Ireland) Motorsport Ireland Rally Academy	Ford Fiesta Rally4	P

Other major entries
No.	Driver	Co-Driver	Entrant	Car	Tyre
56	(Australia) Molly Taylor	(United Kingdom) Sebastian Marshall	M-Sport Poland	Ford Fiesta Rally3	P

=== Route ===
==== Itinerary ====
All dates and times are EEST (UTC+3).

Leg	Date	Time	No.	Stage name	Distance
—N/a	15 July	09:01	—	Abissaare [Shakedown]	6.23 km
1	15 July	20:38	SS1	Tartu 1	1.64 km
1	16 July	09:40	SS2	Arula 1	12.68 km
1	16 July	10:28	SS3	Otepää 1	17.05 km
1	16 July	11:16	SS4	Kanepi 1	16.54 km
1	16 July	12:08	SS5	Kambja 1	17.85 km
1	16 July	15:34	SS6	Arula 2	12.68 km
1	16 July	16:22	SS7	Otepää 2	17.05 km
1	16 July	17:10	SS8	Kanepi 2	16.54 km
1	16 July	18:08	SS9	Kambja 2	17.85 km
2	17 July	08:06	SS10	Peipsiääre 1	23.53 km
2	17 July	09.08	SS11	Mustvee 1	12.28 km
2	17 July	10:36	SS12	Raanitsa 1	22.76 km
2	17 July	11:39	SS13	Vastsemõisa 1	6.70 km
2	17 July	15:06	SS14	Peipsiääre 2	23.53 km
2	17 July	16:08	SS15	Mustvee 2	12.28 km
2	17 July	17:34	SS16	Raanitsa 2	22.76 km
2	17 July	18:37	SS17	Vastsemõisa 2	6.70 km
2	17 July	20:08	SS18	Tartu 2	1.64 km
3	18 July	07:21	SS19	Neeruti 1	7.82 km
3	18 July	08:09	SS20	Elva 1	11.72 km
3	18 July	09:08	SS21	Tartu vald 1	6.51 km
3	18 July	11:41	SS22	Neeruti 2	7.82 km
3	18 July	12:29	SS23	Elva 2	11.72 km
3	18 July	14:18	SS24	Tartu vald 2 [Power Stage]	6.51 km

== Report ==
=== World Rally Cars ===
==== Classification ====
Position		No.	Driver	Co-driver	Entrant	Car	Time	Difference	Points	
Event	Class	No.	Driver	Co-driver	Entrant	Car	Time	Difference	Event	Stage
1	1	69	Kalle Rovanperä	Jonne Halttunen	Toyota Gazoo Racing WRT	Toyota Yaris WRC	2:51:29.1	0.0	25	1
2	2	42	Craig Breen	Paul Nagle	Hyundai Shell Mobis WRT	Hyundai i20 Coupe WRC	2:52:29.0	+59.9	18	0
3	3	11	Thierry Neuville	Martijn Wydaeghe	Hyundai Shell Mobis WRT	Hyundai i20 Coupe WRC	2:52:41.5	+1:12.4	15	4
4	4	1	Sébastien Ogier	Julien Ingrassia	Toyota Gazoo Racing WRT	Toyota Yaris WRC	2:52:53.1	+1:24.0	12	3
5	5	33	Elfyn Evans	Scott Martin	Toyota Gazoo Racing WRT	Toyota Yaris WRC	2:53:36.2	+2:07.1	10	2
6	6	3	Teemu Suninen	Mikko Markkula	M-Sport Ford WRT	Ford Fiesta WRC	2:58:36.4	+7:07.3	8	0
7	7	7	Pierre-Louis Loubet	Florian Haut-Labourdette	Hyundai 2C Competition	Hyundai i20 Coupe WRC	3:00:17.4	+8:48.3	6	0
31	8	8	Ott Tänak	Martin Järveoja	Hyundai Shell Mobis WRT	Hyundai i20 Coupe WRC	3:54:16.0	+1:02:46.9	0	5
32	9	44	Gus Greensmith	Chris Patterson	M-Sport Ford WRT	Ford Fiesta WRC	4:12:05.2	+1:20:36.1	0	0
Retired SS5		18	Takamoto Katsuta	Daniel Barritt	Toyota Gazoo Racing WRT	Toyota Yaris WRC	Co-driver injury		0	0

==== Special stages ====
Day	Stage	Stage name	Length	Winners	Car	Time	Class leaders
15 July	—	Abissaare [Shakedown]	6.23 km	Rovanperä / Halttunen	Toyota Yaris WRC	2:51.1	—N/a
15 July	SS1	Tartu 1	1.64 km	Rovanperä / Halttunen	Toyota Yaris WRC	1:42.8	Rovanperä / Halttunen
16 July	SS2	Arula 1	12.68 km	Tänak / Järveoja	Hyundai i20 Coupe WRC	6:32.1	Tänak / Järveoja
16 July	SS3	Otepää 1	17.05 km	Rovanperä / Halttunen; Breen / Nagle	Toyota Yaris WRC; Hyundai i20 Coupe WRC	8:30.6	Breen / Nagle
16 July	SS4	Kanepi 1	16.54 km	Rovanperä / Halttunen	Toyota Yaris WRC	8:10.5	Rovanperä / Halttunen
16 July	SS5	Kambja 1	17.85 km	Rovanperä / Halttunen	Toyota Yaris WRC	9:39.7	Rovanperä / Halttunen
16 July	SS6	Arula 2	12.68 km	Rovanperä / Halttunen	Toyota Yaris WRC	6:27.9	Rovanperä / Halttunen
16 July	SS7	Otepää 2	17.05 km	Rovanperä / Halttunen	Toyota Yaris WRC	8:19.5	Rovanperä / Halttunen
16 July	SS8	Kanepi 2	16.54 km	Breen / Nagle	Hyundai i20 Coupe WRC	8:00.2	Rovanperä / Halttunen
16 July	SS9	Kambja 2	17.85 km	Rovanperä / Halttunen	Toyota Yaris WRC	9:27.7	Rovanperä / Halttunen
17 July	SS10	Peipsiääre 1	23.53 km	Rovanperä / Halttunen	Toyota Yaris WRC	12:47.4	Rovanperä / Halttunen
17 July	SS11	Mustvee 1	12.28 km	Tänak / Järveoja	Hyundai i20 Coupe WRC	6:26.2	Rovanperä / Halttunen
17 July	SS12	Raanitsa 1	22.76 km	Tänak / Järveoja	Hyundai i20 Coupe WRC	10:58.7	Rovanperä / Halttunen
17 July	SS13	Vastsemõisa 1	7.60 km	Tänak / Järveoja	Hyundai i20 Coupe WRC	4:17.6	Rovanperä / Halttunen
17 July	SS14	Peipsiääre 2	23.53 km	Tänak / Järveoja	Hyundai i20 Coupe WRC	12:45.3	Rovanperä / Halttunen
17 July	SS15	Mustvee 2	12.28 km	Tänak / Järveoja	Hyundai i20 Coupe WRC	6:24.8	Rovanperä / Halttunen
17 July	SS16	Raanitsa 2	22.76 km	Tänak / Järveoja	Hyundai i20 Coupe WRC	10:46.6	Rovanperä / Halttunen
17 July	SS17	Vastsemõisa 2	7.60 km	Neuville / Wydaeghe	Hyundai i20 Coupe WRC	4:16.2	Rovanperä / Halttunen
17 July	SS18	Tartu 2	1.64 km	Ogier / Ingrassia	Toyota Yaris WRC	1:41.9	Rovanperä / Halttunen
18 July	SS19	Neeruti 1	7.82 km	Neuville / Wydaeghe; Tänak / Järveoja	Hyundai i20 Coupe WRC; Hyundai i20 Coupe WRC	4:48.3	Rovanperä / Halttunen
18 July	SS20	Elva 1	11.72 km	Neuville / Wydaeghe; Tänak / Järveoja	Hyundai i20 Coupe WRC; Hyundai i20 Coupe WRC	6:00.2	Rovanperä / Halttunen
18 July	SS21	Tartu vald 1	6.51 km	Neuville / Wydaeghe	Hyundai i20 Coupe WRC	5:58.4	Rovanperä / Halttunen
18 July	SS22	Neeruti 2	7.82 km	Tänak / Järveoja	Hyundai i20 Coupe WRC	4:46.7	Rovanperä / Halttunen
18 July	SS23	Elva 2	11.72 km	Neuville / Wydaeghe	Hyundai i20 Coupe WRC	5:55.1	Rovanperä / Halttunen
18 July	SS24	Tartu vald 2 [Power Stage]	6.51 km	Tänak / Järveoja	Hyundai i20 Coupe WRC	5:52.2	Rovanperä / Halttunen

==== Championship standings ====
Pos.	Drivers' championships			Co-drivers' championships			Manufacturers' championships		
Pos.	Move	Driver	Points	Move	Co-driver	Points	Move	Manufacturer	Points
1		Sébastien Ogier	148		Julien Ingrassia	148		Toyota Gazoo Racing WRT	315
2		Elfyn Evans	111		Scott Martin	111		Hyundai Shell Mobis WRT	256
3		Thierry Neuville	96		Martijn Wydaeghe	96		M-Sport Ford WRT	125
4	2	Kalle Rovanperä	82	2	Jonne Halttunen	82		Hyundai 2C Competition	36
5	1	Ott Tänak	74	1	Martin Järveoja	74			

=== World Rally Championship-2 ===
==== Classification ====
Position		No.	Driver	Co-driver	Entrant	Car	Time	Difference	Points		
Event	Class	No.	Driver	Co-driver	Entrant	Car	Time	Difference	Class	Stage	Event
9	1	20	Andreas Mikkelsen	Ola Fløene	Toksport WRT	Škoda Fabia R5 Evo	3:01:59.0	0.0	25	5	2
10	2	21	Mads Østberg	Torstein Eriksen	TRT World Rally Team	Citroën C3 Rally2	3:02:15.7	+16.7	18	3	1
11	3	22	Marco Bulacia Wilkinson	Marcelo Der Ohannesian	Toksport WRT	Škoda Fabia R5 Evo	3:02:27.6	+28.6	15	4	0
12	4	23	Adrien Fourmaux	Renaud Jamoul	M-Sport Ford WRT	Ford Fiesta R5 Mk. II	3:02:55.1	+56.1	12	2	0
16	5	29	Tom Kristensson	David Arhusiander	M-Sport Ford WRT	Ford Fiesta R5 Mk. II	3:06:59.4	+5:00.4	10	1	0
18	6	28	Georg Linnamäe	James Morgan	ALM Motorsport	Volkswagen Polo GTI R5	3:09:07.4	+7:08.4	8	0	0
Retired SS13		25	Nikolay Gryazin	Konstantin Aleksandrov	Movisport	Volkswagen Polo GTI R5	Rolled		0	0	0
Retired SS9		26	Sean Johnston	Alex Kihurani	Saintéloc Junior Team	Citroën C3 Rally2	Rolled		0	0	0
Retired SS4		24	Jari Huttunen	Mikko Lukka	Hyundai Motorsport N	Hyundai i20 R5	Rolled		0	0	0
Retired SS3		27	Oliver Solberg	Aaron Johnston	Hyundai Motorsport N	Hyundai i20 R5	Engine		0	0	0

==== Special stages ====
Day	Stage	Stage name	Length	Winners	Car	Time	Class leaders
15 July	—	Abissaare [Shakedown]	6.23 km	Solberg / Johnston	Hyundai i20 R5	3:05.6	—N/a
15 July	SS1	Tartu 1	1.64 km	Østberg / Eriksen; Huttunen / Lukka	Citroën C3 Rally2; Hyundai i20 R5	1:43.4	Østberg / Eriksen; Huttunen / Lukka
16 July	SS2	Arula 1	12.68 km	Østberg / Eriksen	Citroën C3 Rally2	6:54.8	Østberg / Eriksen
16 July	SS3	Otepää 1	17.05 km	Østberg / Eriksen; Huttunen / Lukka	Citroën C3 Rally2; Hyundai i20 R5	9:01.2	Østberg / Eriksen
16 July	SS4	Kanepi 1	16.54 km	Mikkelsen / Fløene	Škoda Fabia R5 Evo	8:39.1	Østberg / Eriksen
16 July	SS5	Kambja 1	17.85 km	Østberg / Eriksen	Citroën C3 Rally2	10:17.8	Østberg / Eriksen
16 July	SS6	Arula 2	12.68 km	Mikkelsen / Fløene	Škoda Fabia R5 Evo	6:52.3	Mikkelsen / Fløene
16 July	SS7	Otepää 2	17.05 km	Mikkelsen / Fløene	Škoda Fabia R5 Evo	8:49.0	Mikkelsen / Fløene
16 July	SS8	Kanepi 2	16.54 km	Mikkelsen / Fløene	Škoda Fabia R5 Evo	8:29.0	Mikkelsen / Fløene
16 July	SS9	Kambja 2	17.85 km	Mikkelsen / Fløene	Škoda Fabia R5 Evo	10:05.5	Mikkelsen / Fløene
17 July	SS10	Peipsiääre 1	23.53 km	Østberg / Eriksen	Citroën C3 Rally2	13:45.8	Mikkelsen / Fløene
17 July	SS11	Mustvee 1	12.28 km	Mikkelsen / Fløene	Škoda Fabia R5 Evo	6:51.5	Mikkelsen / Fløene
17 July	SS12	Raanitsa 1	22.76 km	Østberg / Eriksen	Citroën C3 Rally2	11:44.2	Mikkelsen / Fløene
17 July	SS13	Vastsemõisa 1	7.60 km	Mikkelsen / Fløene	Škoda Fabia R5 Evo	4:26.6	Mikkelsen / Fløene
17 July	SS14	Peipsiääre 2	23.53 km	Østberg / Eriksen	Citroën C3 Rally2	13:42.5	Mikkelsen / Fløene
17 July	SS15	Mustvee 2	12.28 km	Mikkelsen / Fløene	Škoda Fabia R5 Evo	6:51.3	Mikkelsen / Fløene
17 July	SS16	Raanitsa 2	22.76 km	Bulacia Wilkinson / Ohannesian	Škoda Fabia R5 Evo	11:34.0	Mikkelsen / Fløene
17 July	SS17	Vastsemõisa 2	7.60 km	Østberg / Eriksen	Citroën C3 Rally2	4:28.7	Mikkelsen / Fløene
17 July	SS18	Tartu 2	1.64 km	Mikkelsen / Fløene	Škoda Fabia R5 Evo	1:44.7	Mikkelsen / Fløene
18 July	SS19	Neeruti 1	7.82 km	Østberg / Eriksen	Citroën C3 Rally2	4:55.9	Mikkelsen / Fløene
18 July	SS20	Elva 1	11.72 km	Østberg / Eriksen	Citroën C3 Rally2	6:17.6	Mikkelsen / Fløene
18 July	SS21	Tartu vald 1	6.51 km	Mikkelsen / Fløene	Škoda Fabia R5 Evo	6:07.2	Mikkelsen / Fløene
18 July	SS22	Neeruti 2	7.82 km	Bulacia Wilkinson / Ohannesian	Škoda Fabia R5 Evo	4:58.4	Mikkelsen / Fløene
18 July	SS23	Elva 2	11.72 km	Bulacia Wilkinson / Ohannesian	Škoda Fabia R5 Evo	6:14.0	Mikkelsen / Fløene
18 July	SS24	Tartu vald 2 [Power Stage]	6.51 km	Mikkelsen / Fløene	Škoda Fabia R5 Evo	6:09.9	Mikkelsen / Fløene

==== Championship standings ====
Pos.	Drivers' championships			Co-drivers' championships			Teams' championships		
Pos.	Move	Driver	Points	Move	Co-driver	Points	Move	Manufacturer	Points
1		Andreas Mikkelsen	98		Ola Fløene	98		Toksport WRT	168
2		Mads Østberg	87		Torstein Eriksen	87	1	M-Sport Ford WRT	131
3		Marco Bulacia Wilkinson	82		Marcelo Der Ohannesian	82	1	Movisport	125
4		Esapekka Lappi	59		Janne Ferm	59		Hyundai Motorsport N	12
5	1	Adrien Fourmaux	48	1	Renaud Jamoul	48			

=== World Rally Championship-3 ===
==== Classification ====
Position		No.	Driver	Co-driver	Entrant	Car	Time	Difference	Points		
Event	Class	No.	Driver	Co-driver	Entrant	Car	Time	Difference	Class	Stage	Event
8	1	38	Aleksey Lukyanuk	Yaroslav Fedorov	Aleksey Lukyanuk	Škoda Fabia R5 Evo	3:01:45.2	0.0	25	0	4
13	2	30	Kajetan Kajetanowicz	Maciej Szczepaniak	Kajetan Kajetanowicz	Škoda Fabia R5 Evo	3:05:01.1	+3:15.9	18	0	0
14	3	36	Mikko Heikkilä	Topi Luhtinen	Mikko Heikkilä	Škoda Fabia R5 Evo	3:05:59.6	+4:14.4	15	1	0
15	4	35	Pepe López	Borja Odriozola	Pepe López	Škoda Fabia R5 Evo	3:06:43.1	+4:57.9	12	4	0
17	5	39	Raul Jeets	Andrus Toom	Raul Jeets	Škoda Fabia R5 Evo	3:09:02.9	+7:17.7	10	0	0
19	6	41	Vladas Jurkevičius	Aisvydas Paliukėnas	Vladas Jurkevičius	Škoda Fabia R5 Evo	3:11:43.7	+9:58.5	8	0	0
20	7	32	Fabrizio Zaldívar	Carlos del Barrio	Fabrizio Zaldívar	Škoda Fabia R5 Evo	3:11:53.4	+10:08.2	6	5	0
27	8	37	Emilio Fernández	Rubén García	Emilio Fernández	Škoda Fabia R5 Evo	3:26:01.8	+24:16.6	4	2	0
29	9	46	Miguel Díaz-Aboitiz	Diego Sanjuan de Eusebio	Miguel Díaz-Aboitiz	Škoda Fabia R5 Evo	3:36:45.2	+35:00.0	2	0	0
33	10	31	Egon Kaur	Silver Simm	Egon Kaur	Volkswagen Polo GTI R5	4:12:41.7	+1:10:56.5	1	3	0
36	11	43	Rakan Al-Rashed	Antti Haapala	Rakan Al-Rashed	Volkswagen Polo GTI R5	4:51:34.4	+1:49:49.2	0	0	0
Retired SS12		34	Emil Lindholm	Reeta Hämäläinen	Emil Lindholm	Škoda Fabia R5 Evo	Crash		0	0	0
Retired SS12		40	Priit Koik	Kristo Tamm	Priit Koik	Ford Fiesta R5 Mk. II	Withdrawn		0	0	0
Retired SS10		45	Radik Shaymiev	Maxim Tsvetkov	Radik Shaymiev	Hyundai i20 R5	Withdrawn		0	0	0

==== Special stages ====
Day	Stage	Stage name	Length	Winners	Car	Time	Class leaders
15 July	—	Abissaare [Shakedown]	6.23 km	Lukyanuk / Fedorov	Škoda Fabia R5 Evo	3:05.9	—N/a
15 July	SS1	Tartu 1	1.64 km	Lukyanuk / Fedorov	Škoda Fabia R5 Evo	1:43.4	Lukyanuk / Fedorov
16 July	SS2	Arula 1	12.68 km	Lukyanuk / Fedorov	Škoda Fabia R5 Evo	6:57.3	Lukyanuk / Fedorov
16 July	SS3	Otepää 1	17.05 km	Lukyanuk / Fedorov	Škoda Fabia R5 Evo	8:56.3	Lukyanuk / Fedorov
16 July	SS4	Kanepi 1	16.54 km	Lukyanuk / Fedorov	Škoda Fabia R5 Evo	8:35.7	Lukyanuk / Fedorov
16 July	SS5	Kambja 1	17.85 km	Lukyanuk / Fedorov	Škoda Fabia R5 Evo	10:13.5	Lukyanuk / Fedorov
16 July	SS6	Arula 2	12.68 km	Lukyanuk / Fedorov	Škoda Fabia R5 Evo	6:53.0	Lukyanuk / Fedorov
16 July	SS7	Otepää 2	17.05 km	Lukyanuk / Fedorov	Škoda Fabia R5 Evo	8:48.5	Lukyanuk / Fedorov
16 July	SS8	Kanepi 2	16.54 km	Lukyanuk / Fedorov	Škoda Fabia R5 Evo	8:26.1	Lukyanuk / Fedorov
16 July	SS9	Kambja 2	17.85 km	Lukyanuk / Fedorov	Škoda Fabia R5 Evo	10:05.6	Lukyanuk / Fedorov
17 July	SS10	Peipsiääre 1	23.53 km	Lukyanuk / Fedorov	Škoda Fabia R5 Evo	13:49.1	Lukyanuk / Fedorov
17 July	SS11	Mustvee 1	12.28 km	Lukyanuk / Fedorov	Škoda Fabia R5 Evo	6:54.8	Lukyanuk / Fedorov
17 July	SS12	Raanitsa 1	22.76 km	Lukyanuk / Fedorov	Škoda Fabia R5 Evo	11:41.3	Lukyanuk / Fedorov
17 July	SS13	Vastsemõisa 1	7.60 km	Lukyanuk / Fedorov	Škoda Fabia R5 Evo	4:32.2	Lukyanuk / Fedorov
17 July	SS14	Peipsiääre 2	23.53 km	Lukyanuk / Fedorov	Škoda Fabia R5 Evo	13:39.5	Lukyanuk / Fedorov
17 July	SS15	Mustvee 2	12.28 km	Lukyanuk / Fedorov	Škoda Fabia R5 Evo	6:55.5	Lukyanuk / Fedorov
17 July	SS16	Raanitsa 2	22.76 km	Lukyanuk / Fedorov	Škoda Fabia R5 Evo	11:35.0	Lukyanuk / Fedorov
17 July	SS17	Vastsemõisa 2	7.60 km	Lukyanuk / Fedorov	Škoda Fabia R5 Evo	4:31.7	Lukyanuk / Fedorov
17 July	SS18	Tartu 2	1.64 km	Lukyanuk / Fedorov	Škoda Fabia R5 Evo	1:44.2	Lukyanuk / Fedorov
18 July	SS19	Neeruti 1	7.82 km	Lukyanuk / Fedorov	Škoda Fabia R5 Evo	5:00.0	Lukyanuk / Fedorov
18 July	SS20	Elva 1	11.72 km	Kaur / Simm	Volkswagen Polo GTI R5	6:18.9	Lukyanuk / Fedorov
18 July	SS21	Tartu vald 1	6.51 km	Kajetanowicz / Szczepaniak	Škoda Fabia R5 Evo	6:09.4	Lukyanuk / Fedorov
18 July	SS22	Neeruti 2	7.82 km	Lukyanuk / Fedorov	Škoda Fabia R5 Evo	4:58.5	Lukyanuk / Fedorov
18 July	SS23	Elva 2	11.72 km	Kaur / Simm	Volkswagen Polo GTI R5	6:15.6	Lukyanuk / Fedorov
18 July	SS24	Tartu vald 2 [Power Stage]	6.51 km	Zaldívar / del Barrio	Škoda Fabia R5 Evo	6:19.4	Lukyanuk / Fedorov

==== Championship standings ====
Pos.	Drivers' championships			Co-drivers' championships		
Pos.	Move	Driver	Points	Move	Co-driver	Points
1		Yohan Rossel	98	1	Maciek Szczepaniak	82
2		Kajetan Kajetanowicz	82	1	Alexandre Coria	70
3		Nicolas Ciamin	47		Yannick Roche	57
4	4	Fabrizio Zaldívar	39	4	Carlos del Barrio	39
5	4	Pepe López	36	2	Silver Simm	32

=== Junior World Rally Championship ===
==== Classification ====
Position		No.	Driver	Co-driver	Entrant	Car	Time	Difference	Points	
Event	Class	No.	Driver	Co-driver	Entrant	Car	Time	Difference	Class	Stage
21	1	48	Sami Pajari	Marko Salminen	Porvoon Autopalvelu	Ford Fiesta Rally4	3:19:03.2	0.0	25	9
22	2	49	Jon Armstrong	Phil Hall	Jon Armstrong	Ford Fiesta Rally4	3:19:27.3	+24.1	18	5
23	3	47	Mārtiņš Sesks	Renārs Francis	LMT Autosporta Akademija	Ford Fiesta Rally4	3:19:59.6	+56.4	15	7
24	4	51	Lauri Joona	Mikael Korhonen	Team Flying Finn	Ford Fiesta Rally4	3:22:46.9	+3:43.7	12	0
25	5	54	Raul Badiu	Rareș Fetean	Raul Badiu	Ford Fiesta Rally4	3:23:45.5	+4:42.3	10	0
26	6	53	William Creighton	Liam Regan	Motorsport Ireland Rally Academy	Ford Fiesta Rally4	3:24:40.3	+5:37.1	8	0
34	7	52	Robert Virves	Sander Pruul	Autosport Team Estonia	Ford Fiesta Rally4	4:33:01.2	+1:13:58.0	6	0
Retired SS24		50	Martin Koči	Petr Těšínský	Styllex Motorsport	Ford Fiesta Rally4	Driveshaft		0	3

==== Special stages ====
Day	Stage	Stage name	Length	Winners	Car	Time	Class leaders
15 July	—	Abissaare [Shakedown]	6.23 km	Armstrong / Hall	Ford Fiesta Rally4	3:26.3	—N/a
15 July	SS1	Tartu 1	1.64 km	Pajari / Salminen	Ford Fiesta Rally4	1:52.5	Pajari / Salminen
16 July	SS2	Arula 1	12.68 km	Pajari / Salminen	Ford Fiesta Rally4	7:36.4	Pajari / Salminen
16 July	SS3	Otepää 1	17.05 km	Pajari / Salminen	Ford Fiesta Rally4	9:53.4	Pajari / Salminen
16 July	SS4	Kanepi 1	16.54 km	Pajari / Salminen	Ford Fiesta Rally4	9:23.7	Pajari / Salminen
16 July	SS5	Kambja 1	17.85 km	Pajari / Salminen	Ford Fiesta Rally4	11:11.4	Pajari / Salminen
16 July	SS6	Arula 2	12.68 km	Pajari / Salminen	Ford Fiesta Rally4	7:32.0	Pajari / Salminen
16 July	SS7	Otepää 2	17.05 km	Pajari / Salminen	Ford Fiesta Rally4	9:47.8	Pajari / Salminen
16 July	SS8	Kanepi 2	16.54 km	Armstrong / Hall	Ford Fiesta Rally4	9:13.0	Pajari / Salminen
16 July	SS9	Kambja 2	17.85 km	Armstrong / Hall	Ford Fiesta Rally4	11:02.7	Pajari / Salminen
17 July	SS10	Peipsiääre 1	23.53 km	Koči / Těšínský	Ford Fiesta Rally4	7:40.6	Pajari / Salminen
17 July	SS11	Mustvee 1	12.28 km	Koči / Těšínský	Ford Fiesta Rally4	7:40.6	Pajari / Salminen
17 July	SS12	Raanitsa 1	22.76 km	Koči / Těšínský	Ford Fiesta Rally4	12:42.8	Pajari / Salminen
17 July	SS13	Vastsemõisa 1	7.60 km	Pajari / Salminen	Ford Fiesta Rally4	4:53.8	Pajari / Salminen
17 July	SS14	Peipsiääre 2	23.53 km	Sesks / Francis	Ford Fiesta Rally4	15:15.4	Pajari / Salminen
17 July	SS15	Mustvee 2	12.28 km	Armstrong / Hall	Ford Fiesta Rally4	7:31.7	Pajari / Salminen
17 July	SS16	Raanitsa 2	22.76 km	Sesks / Francis	Ford Fiesta Rally4	12:28.1	Pajari / Salminen
17 July	SS17	Vastsemõisa 2	7.60 km	Sesks / Francis	Ford Fiesta Rally4	4:51.9	Pajari / Salminen
17 July	SS18	Tartu 2	1.64 km	Sesks / Francis	Ford Fiesta Rally4	1:51.9	Pajari / Salminen
18 July	SS19	Neeruti 1	7.82 km	Armstrong / Hall	Ford Fiesta Rally4	5:26.3	Pajari / Salminen
18 July	SS20	Elva 1	11.72 km	Pajari / Salminen	Ford Fiesta Rally4	6:49.5	Pajari / Salminen
18 July	SS21	Tartu vald 1	6.51 km	Sesks / Francis	Ford Fiesta Rally4	6:42.6	Pajari / Salminen
18 July	SS22	Neeruti 2	7.82 km	Armstrong / Hall	Ford Fiesta Rally4	5:31.9	Pajari / Salminen
18 July	SS23	Elva 2	11.72 km	Sesks / Francis	Ford Fiesta Rally4	6:43.6	Pajari / Salminen
18 July	SS24	Tartu vald 2	6.51 km	Sesks / Francis	Ford Fiesta Rally4	6:52.2	Pajari / Salminen

==== Championship standings ====
Pos.	Drivers' championships			Co-drivers' championships			Trophy for nations		
Pos.	Move	Driver	Points	Move	Co-driver	Points	Move	Manufacturer	Points
1	1	Sami Pajari	71	1	Marko Salminen	71		Latvia	58
2	1	Mārtiņš Sesks	67	1	Renars Francis	67		Finland	58
3		Jon Armstrong	56		Phil Hall	56		United Kingdom	43
4	1	Lauri Joona	40		Petr Těšínský	34	1	Estonia	31
5	1	Martin Koči	34		Ari Koponen	28	1	Ireland	30

== Notes ==
Previous rally: 2021 Safari Rally	2021 FIA World Rally Championship	Next rally: 2021 Ypres Rally
Previous rally: 2020 Rally Estonia	2021 Rally Estonia	Next rally: 2022 Rally Estonia
