= 2021 Rally Catalunya =

56th edition of Rally de Catalunya

2021 Rally Catalunya RallyRACC Catalunya - Costa Daurada 2021
Round 11 of 12 in the 2021 World Rally Championship
← Previous event	Next event →
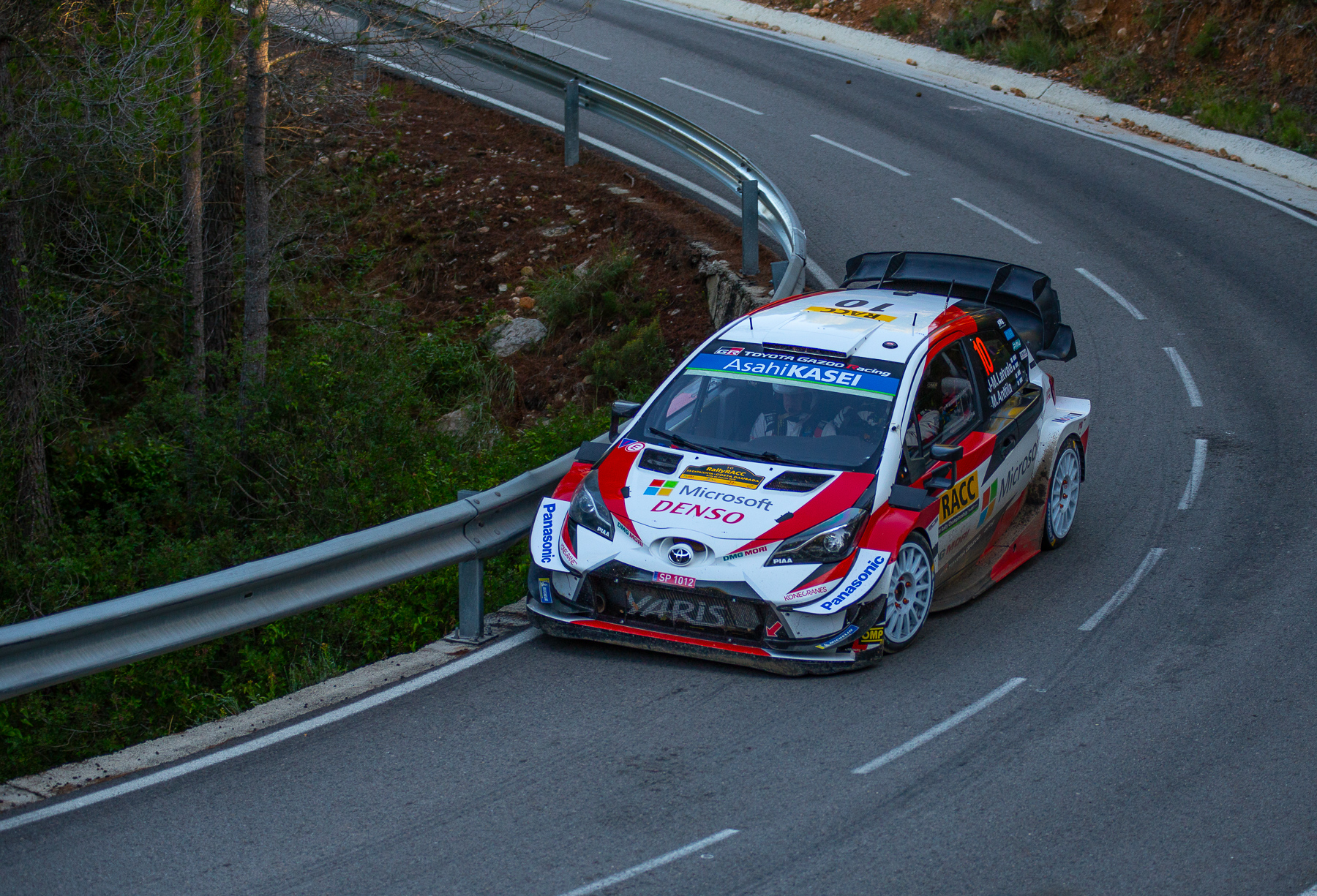
- Rally Catalunya returned to the championship as a full tarmac event.
- Host country: Spain
- Rally base: Salou, Tarragona
- Dates run: 14 – 17 October 2021
- Start location: Vilaplana, Tarragona
- Finish location: Riudecanyes, Tarragona
- Stages: 17 (280.46 km; 174.27 miles)
- Stage surface: Tarmac
- Transport distance: 1,129.83 km (702.04 miles)
- Overall distance: 1,410.29 km (876.31 miles)

Statistics
- Crews registered: 83
- Crews: 83 at start, 50 at finish

Overall results
- Overall winner: (Belgium) Thierry Neuville (Belgium) Martijn Wydaeghe (South Korea) Hyundai Shell Mobis WRT; 2:34:11.8
- Power Stage winner: (Spain) Dani Sordo (Spain) Cándido Carrera (South Korea) Hyundai Shell Mobis WRT; 10:09.3

Support category results
- WRC-2 winner: (France) Eric Camilli (France) Maxime Vilmot (Portugal) Sports & You; 2:44:01.2
- WRC-3 winner: (Finland) Reeta Hämäläinen (Finland) Emil Lindholm; 2:44:31.9
- J-WRC winner: (Finland) Sami Pajari (Finland) Marko Salminen (Finland) Porvoon Autopalvelu; 2:58:02.5

The 2021 Rally Catalunya (also known as the RallyRACC Catalunya - Costa Daurada 2021) was a motor racing event for rally cars that held over four days between 14 and 17 October 2021. It marked the fifty-sixth running of the Rally de Catalunya. The event was the tenth round of the 2021 World Rally Championship, World Rally Championship-2 and World Rally Championship-3. It also hosted as the final round of the 2021 Junior World Rally Championship. The 2021 event was based in Salou in the province of Tarragona in Catalonia and was contested over seventeen special stages totalling 280.46 km (174.27 mi) in competitive distance.

Thierry Neuville and Nicolas Gilsoul were the defending rally winners. Their team, Hyundai Shell Mobis WRT, were the defending manufacturers' winners. However, Gilsoul did not defend his title as Neuville changed his co-driver to Martijn Wydaeghe at the start of the season. Mads Østberg and Torstein Eriksen were the defending winners in the WRC-2 category, (Note: The championship was known as the World Rally Championship-2 Pro in 2019.) while Eric Camilli and Benjamin Veillas were the defending winners in the WRC-3 category. (Note: The championship was known as the World Rally Championship-2 in 2019.)

Neuville successfully defended his title with his new co-driver Martijn Wydaeghe. Their team, Hyundai Shell Mobis WRT, successfully defended their titles. In the World Rally Championship-2 category, Eric Camilli and Maxime Vilmot won the event, while Andreas Mikkelsen confirmed to win the WRC-2 title. In the World Rally Championship-3 category, Emil Lindholm and Reeta Hämäläinen took back-to-back victory. In the junior championship, the Finnish crew of Sami Pajari and Marko Salminen won the rally and became the junior rally champions.

== Background ==
=== Championship standings prior to the event ===
Reigning World Champions Sébastien Ogier and Julien Ingrassia entered the round with a twenty-four-point lead over Elfyn Evans and Scott Martin. Thierry Neuville and Martijn Wydaeghe were third, a further thirty-six points behind. In the World Rally Championship for Manufacturers, Toyota Gazoo Racing WRT held a massive sixty-one-point lead over defending manufacturers' champions Hyundai Shell Mobis WRT, followed by M-Sport Ford WRT.

In the World Rally Championship-2 standings, Andreas Mikkelsen led Mads Østberg by eight points in the drivers' championship, with Marco Bulacia Wilkinson in third. In the co-drivers' championship Torstein Eriksen held a fourteen-point lead over Marcelo Der Ohannesian, with Ola Fløene in third.

In the World Rally Championship-3 standings, Yohan Rossel led Kajetan Kajetanowicz by fifteen points in the drivers' championship, with Emil Lindholm in third. In the co-drivers' championship, Maciek Szczepaniak held a thirteen-point lead over Alexandre Coria, with Yannick Roche in third.

In the junior championship, Sami Pajari and Marko Salminen led Jon Armstrong and Phil Hall by three points. Mārtiņš Sesks and Renars Francis were third, eleven points further back. In the Nations' standings, Finland held an eight-point lead over United Kingdom and Latvia.

=== Entry list ===
The following crews entered the rally. The event was open to crews competing in the World Rally Championship, its support categories, the World Rally Championship-2 and World Rally Championship-3, and privateer entries that were not registered to score points in any championship. Twelve entries for the World Rally Championship were received, as were eight in the World Rally Championship-2 and fifteen in the World Rally Championship-3. A further six crews entered the Junior World Rally Championship in Ford Fiesta Rally4s.

Rally1 entries competing in the World Rally Championship
No.	Driver	Co-Driver	Entrant	Car	Tyre
1	(France) Sébastien Ogier	(France) Julien Ingrassia	(Japan) Toyota Gazoo Racing WRT	Toyota Yaris WRC	P
2	(Sweden) Oliver Solberg	(United Kingdom) Craig Drew	(France) Hyundai 2C Competition	Hyundai i20 Coupe WRC	P
6	(Spain) Dani Sordo	(Spain) Cándido Carrera	(South Korea) Hyundai Shell Mobis WRT	Hyundai i20 Coupe WRC	P
8	(Estonia) Ott Tänak	(Estonia) Martin Järveoja	(South Korea) Hyundai Shell Mobis WRT	Hyundai i20 Coupe WRC	P
11	(Belgium) Thierry Neuville	(Belgium) Martijn Wydaeghe	(South Korea) Hyundai Shell Mobis WRT	Hyundai i20 Coupe WRC	P
14	(Spain) Nil Solans	(Spain) Marc Martí	(France) Hyundai 2C Competition	Hyundai i20 Coupe WRC	P
16	(France) Adrien Fourmaux	(France) Alexandre Coria	(United Kingdom) M-Sport Ford WRT	Ford Fiesta WRC	P
18	(Japan) Takamoto Katsuta	(Republic of Ireland) Aaron Johnston	(Japan) Toyota Gazoo Racing WRT	Toyota Yaris WRC	P
33	(United Kingdom) Elfyn Evans	(United Kingdom) Scott Martin	(Japan) Toyota Gazoo Racing WRT	Toyota Yaris WRC	P
44	(United Kingdom) Gus Greensmith	(Republic of Ireland) Chris Patterson	(United Kingdom) M-Sport Ford WRT	Ford Fiesta WRC	P
54	(France) Armando Pereira	(France) Rémi Tutélaire	(France) Armando Pereira	Ford Fiesta WRC	P
69	(Finland) Kalle Rovanperä	(Finland) Jonne Halttunen	(Japan) Toyota Gazoo Racing WRT	Toyota Yaris WRC	P

Rally2 entries competing in the World Rally Championship-2
No.	Driver	Co-Driver	Entrant	Car	Tyre
21	(Norway) Mads Østberg	(Norway) Torstein Eriksen	(Hungary) TRT World Rally Team	Citroën C3 Rally2	P
23	(Finland) Jari Huttunen	(Finland) Mikko Lukka	(South Korea) Hyundai Motorsport N	Hyundai i20 N Rally2	P
24	(Finland) Teemu Suninen	(Finland) Mikko Markkula	(South Korea) Hyundai Motorsport N	Hyundai i20 N Rally2	P
25	(Estonia) Georg Linnamäe	(United Kingdom) James Morgan	(Estonia) ALM Motorsport	Volkswagen Polo GTI R5	P
26	(United States) Sean Johnston	(United States) Alex Kihurani	(France) Saintéloc Junior Team	Citroën C3 Rally2	P
27	(France) Eric Camilli	(France) Maxime Vilmot	(Portugal) Sports & You	Citroën C3 Rally2	P
28	(Czech Republic) Erik Cais	(Czech Republic) Jindřiška Žáková	(Italy) Movisport	Ford Fiesta Rally2	P

Rally2 entries competing in the World Rally Championship-3 (Note: Under the Sporting Regulations, each car competing in the World Rally Championship-3 is entered under the driver's name.)
No.	Driver	Co-Driver	Entrant	Car	Tyre
29	(Poland) Kajetan Kajetanowicz	(Poland) Maciej Szczepaniak	(Poland) Kajetan Kajetanowicz	Škoda Fabia Rally2 evo	P
30	(United Kingdom) Chris Ingram	(United Kingdom) Ross Whittock	(United Kingdom) Chris Ingram	Škoda Fabia Rally2 evo	P
31	(Paraguay) Fabrizio Zaldivar	(Spain) Carlos del Barrio	(Paraguay) Fabrizio Zaldivar	Škoda Fabia Rally2 evo	P
32	(Spain) Pepe López	(Spain) Borja Rozada	(Spain) Pepe López	Škoda Fabia Rally2 evo	P
34	(Finland) Mikko Heikkilä	(Finland) Topi Luhtinen	(Finland) Mikko Heikkilä	Škoda Fabia Rally2 evo	P
35	(Republic of Ireland) Josh McErlean	(Republic of Ireland) James Fulton	(Republic of Ireland) Josh McErlean	Hyundai i20 R5	P
36	(Spain) Jan Solans	(Spain) Rodrigo Sanjuan de Eusebio	(Spain) Jan Solans	Citroën C3 Rally2	P
37	(Germany) Armin Kremer	(Germany) Ella Kremer	(Germany) Armin Kremer	Citroën C3 Rally2	P
38	(Italy) Mauro Miele	(Italy) Luca Beltrame	(Italy) Mauro Miele	Škoda Fabia Rally2 evo	P
39	(Spain) Miguel Díaz-Aboitiz	(Spain) Diego Sanjuan de Eusebio	(Spain) Miguel Díaz-Aboitiz	Škoda Fabia Rally2 evo	P
40	(Finland) Reeta Hämäläinen	(Finland) Emil Lindholm	(Finland) Reeta Hämäläinen	Škoda Fabia Rally2 evo	P
41	(United Kingdom) Neil Simpson	(United Kingdom) Michael Gibson	(United Kingdom) Neil Simpson	Škoda Fabia Rally2 evo	P
42	(Czech Republic) Dominik Stříteský	(Czech Republic) Jiří Hovorka	(Czech Republic) Dominik Stříteský	Škoda Fabia Rally2 evo	P
43	(United Kingdom) Sebastian Perez	(Republic of Ireland) Gary McElhinney	(United Kingdom) Sebastian Perez	Ford Fiesta Rally2	P

Rally4 entries competing in the Junior World Rally Championship
No.	Driver	Co-Driver	Entrant	Car	Tyre
48	(Finland) Sami Pajari	(Finland) Marko Salminen	(Finland) Porvoon Autopalvelu	Ford Fiesta Rally4	P
49	(United Kingdom) Jon Armstrong	(United Kingdom) Phil Hall	(United Kingdom) Jon Armstrong	Ford Fiesta Rally4	P
50	(Latvia) Mārtiņš Sesks	(Latvia) Renārs Francis	(Latvia) LMT Autosporta Akademija	Ford Fiesta Rally4	P
51	(Finland) Lauri Joona	(Finland) Mikael Korhonen	(Finland) Team Flying Finn	Ford Fiesta Rally4	P
52	(Republic of Ireland) William Creighton	(Republic of Ireland) Liam Regan	(Republic of Ireland) Motorsport Ireland Rally Academy	Ford Fiesta Rally4	P
53	(Estonia) Robert Virves	(Estonia) Aleks Lesk	Autosport Team Estonia	Ford Fiesta Rally4	P

Other major entries
No.	Driver	Co-Driver	Entrant	Car	Tyre
20	(Bolivia) Marco Bulacia Wilkinson	(Argentina) Marcelo Der Ohannesian	(Germany) Toksport WRT	Škoda Fabia Rally2 evo	P
22	Nikolay Gryazin (Note: Nikolay Gryazin is Russian, but he competes as a neutral competitor using the designation RAF (Russian Automobile Federation), as the Court of Arbitration for Sport upheld a ban on Russia competing at World Championships. The ban was implemented by the World Anti-Doping Agency in response to state-sponsored doping program of Russian athletes.)	Konstantin Aleksandrov (Note: Konstantin Aleksandrov is Russian, but he competes as a neutral competitor using the designation RAF (Russian Automobile Federation), as the Court of Arbitration for Sport upheld a ban on Russia competing at World Championships. The ban was implemented by the World Anti-Doping Agency in response to state-sponsored doping program of Russian athletes.)	(Italy) Movisport (Note: Gryazin and Aleksandrov are competing only for the Teams' Championship points.)	Škoda Fabia Rally2 evo	P

=== Route ===
==== Itinerary ====
All dates and times are CEST (UTC+2).

Date	Time	No.	Stage name	Distance
14 October	9:01	—	Coll de la Teixeta [Shakedown]	4.31 km
15 October	8:43	SS1	Vilaplana 1	20.00 km
15 October	10:21	SS2	La Granadella 1	21.80 km
15 October	11:42	SS3	Riba-roja 1	14.21 km
15 October	15:00	SS4	Vilaplana 2	20.00 km
15 October	16:38	SS5	La Granadella 2	21.80 km
15 October	17:59	SS6	Riba-roja 2	14.21 km
16 October	8:44	SS7	Savallà 1	14.08 km
16 October	9:37	SS8	Querol - Les Pobles 1	19.17 km
16 October	10:38	SS9	El Montmell 1	24.40 km
16 October	14:14	SS10	Savallà 2	14.08 km
16 October	15:07	SS11	Querol - Les Pobles 2	19.17 km
16 October	16:08	SS12	El Montmell 2	24.40 km
16 October	18:00	SS13	Salou	2.24 km
17 October	7:00	SS14	Santa Marina 1	9.10 km
17 October	8:08	SS15	Riudecanyes 1	16.35 km
17 October	10:29	SS16	Santa Marina 2	9.10 km
17 October	12:18	SS17	Riudecanyes 2 [Power Stage]	16.35 km

== Report ==
=== World Rally Cars ===
==== Classification ====
Position		No.	Driver	Co-driver	Entrant	Car	Time	Difference	Points	
Event	Class	No.	Driver	Co-driver	Entrant	Car	Time	Difference	Event	Stage
1	1	11	Thierry Neuville	Martijn Wydaeghe	Hyundai Shell Mobis WRT	Hyundai i20 Coupe WRC	2:34:11.8	0.0	25	4
2	2	33	Elfyn Evans	Scott Martin	Toyota Gazoo Racing WRT	Toyota Yaris WRC	2:34:35.9	+24.1	18	3
3	3	6	Dani Sordo	Cándido Carrera	Hyundai Shell Mobis WRT	Hyundai i20 Coupe WRC	2:34:47.1	+35.3	15	5
4	4	1	Sébastien Ogier	Julien Ingrassia	Toyota Gazoo Racing WRT	Toyota Yaris WRC	2:34:53.9	+42.1	12	2
5	5	69	Kalle Rovanperä	Jonne Halttunen	Toyota Gazoo Racing WRT	Toyota Yaris WRC	2:35:43.6	+1:31.8	10	1
6	6	44	Gus Greensmith	Chris Patterson	M-Sport Ford WRT	Ford Fiesta WRC	2:38:29.1	+4:17.3	8	0
7	7	2	Oliver Solberg	Craig Drew	Hyundai Motorsport N	Hyundai i20 Coupe WRC	2:38:38.5	+4:26.7	6	0
8	8	14	Nil Solans	Marc Martí	Hyundai 2C Competition	Hyundai i20 Coupe WRC	2:38:46.7	+4:34.9	4	0
16	9	16	Adrien Fourmaux	Alexandre Coria	M-Sport Ford WRT	Ford Fiesta WRC	2:47:04.8	+12:53.0	0	0
39	10	54	Armando Pereira	Rémi Tutélaire	Armando Pereira	Ford Fiesta WRC	3:21:30.3	+47:18.5	0	0
40	11	18	Takamoto Katsuta	Daniel Barritt	Toyota Gazoo Racing WRT	Toyota Yaris WRC	3:27:10.1	+52:58.3	0	0
Retired SS4		8	Ott Tänak	Martin Järveoja	Hyundai Shell Mobis WRT	Hyundai i20 Coupe WRC	Off-road		0	0

==== Special stages ====
Day	Stage	Stage name	Length	Winners	Car	Time	Class leaders
14 October	—	Coll de la Teixeta [Shakedown]	4.31 km	Ogier / Ingrassia	Toyota Yaris WRC	2:33.6	—N/a
15 October	SS1	Vilaplana 1	20.00 km	Evans / Martin	Toyota Yaris WRC	10:16.9	Evans / Martin
15 October	SS2	La Granadella 1	21.80 km	Neuville / Wydaeghe; Evans / Martin	Hyundai i20 Coupe WRC; Toyota Yaris WRC	11:46.0	Evans / Martin
15 October	SS3	Riba-roja 1	14.21 km	Evans / Martin	Toyota Yaris WRC	8:30.8	Evans / Martin
15 October	SS4	Vilaplana 2	20.00 km	Neuville / Wydaeghe	Hyundai i20 Coupe WRC	10:17.6	Evans / Martin
15 October	SS5	La Granadella 2	21.80 km	Neuville / Wydaeghe	Hyundai i20 Coupe WRC	11:49.2	Neuville / Wydaeghe
15 October	SS6	Riba-roja 2	14.21 km	Neuville / Wydaeghe	Hyundai i20 Coupe WRC	8:38.2	Neuville / Wydaeghe
16 October	SS7	Savallà 1	14.08 km	Neuville / Wydaeghe	Hyundai i20 Coupe WRC	7:22.5	Neuville / Wydaeghe
16 October	SS8	Querol - Les Pobles 1	19.17 km	Neuville / Wydaeghe	Hyundai i20 Coupe WRC	10:29.6	Neuville / Wydaeghe
16 October	SS9	El Montmell 1	24.40 km	Neuville / Wydaeghe	Hyundai i20 Coupe WRC	12:03.5	Neuville / Wydaeghe
16 October	SS10	Savallà 2	14.08 km	Neuville / Wydaeghe	Hyundai i20 Coupe WRC	7:24.5	Neuville / Wydaeghe
16 October	SS11	Querol - Les Pobles 2	19.17 km	Neuville / Wydaeghe; Ogier / Ingrassia	Hyundai i20 Coupe WRC; Toyota Yaris WRC	10:30.5	Neuville / Wydaeghe
16 October	SS12	El Montmell 2	24.40 km	Ogier / Ingrassia	Toyota Yaris WRC	12:03.7	Neuville / Wydaeghe
16 October	SS13	Salou	2.24 km	Neuville / Wydaeghe	Hyundai i20 Coupe WRC	2:23.6	Neuville / Wydaeghe
17 October	SS14	Santa Marina 1	9.10 km	Sordo / Carrera	Hyundai i20 Coupe WRC	5:05.5	Neuville / Wydaeghe
17 October	SS15	Riudecanyes 1	16.35 km	Sordo / Carrera	Hyundai i20 Coupe WRC	10:04.3	Neuville / Wydaeghe
17 October	SS16	Santa Marina 2	9.10 km	Sordo / Carrera	Hyundai i20 Coupe WRC	5:02.4	Neuville / Wydaeghe
17 October	SS17	Riudecanyes 2 [Power Stage]	16.35 km	Sordo / Carrera	Hyundai i20 Coupe WRC	10:09.3	Neuville / Wydaeghe

==== Championship standings ====
Pos.	Drivers' championships			Co-drivers' championships			Manufacturers' championships		
Pos.	Move	Driver	Points	Move	Co-driver	Points	Move	Manufacturer	Points
1		Sébastien Ogier	204		Julien Ingrassia	204		Toyota Gazoo Racing WRT	476
2		Elfyn Evans	187		Scott Martin	187		Hyundai Shell Mobis WRT	429
3		Thierry Neuville	159		Martijn Wydaeghe	159		M-Sport Ford WRT	190
4		Kalle Rovanperä	140		Jonne Halttunen	140		Hyundai 2C Competition	58
5		Ott Tänak	128		Martin Järveoja	128			

=== World Rally Championship-2 ===
==== Classification ====
Position		No.	Driver	Co-driver	Entrant	Car	Time	Difference	Points		
Event	Class	No.	Driver	Co-driver	Entrant	Car	Time	Difference	Class	Stage	Event
9	1	27	Eric Camilli	Maxime Vilmot	Sports & You	Citroën C3 Rally2	2:44:01.2	0.0	25	2	2
11	2	23	Teemu Suninen	Mikko Markkula	Hyundai Motorsport N	Hyundai i20 N Rally2	2:44:21.4	+20.2	18	4	0
13	3	28	Erik Cais	Jindřiška Žáková	Movisport	Ford Fiesta Rally2	2:44:57.3	+56.1	15	3	0
15	4	21	Mads Østberg	Torstein Eriksen	TRT World Rally Team	Citroën C3 Rally2	2:45:53.0	+1:51.8	12	5	0
19	5	26	Sean Johnston	Alex Kihurani	Saintéloc Junior Team	Citroën C3 Rally2	2:49:32.0	+5:30.8	10	0	0
21	6	25	Georg Linnamäe	James Morgan	ALM Motorsport	Volkswagen Polo GTI R5	2:50:40.3	+6:39.1	8	1	0
Retired SS10		23	Jari Huttunen	Mikko Lukka	Hyundai Motorsport N	Hyundai i20 N Rally2	Oil Leak		0	0	0

==== Special stages ====
Day	Stage	Stage name	Length	Winners	Car	Time	Class leaders
14 October	—	Coll de la Teixeta [Shakedown]	4.31 km	Østberg / Eriksen	Citroën C3 Rally2	2:42.2	—N/a
15 October	SS1	Vilaplana 1	20.00 km	Østberg / Eriksen	Citroën C3 Rally2	11:01.8	Østberg / Eriksen
15 October	SS2	La Granadella 1	21.80 km	Camilli / Vilmot	Citroën C3 Rally2	12:33.7	Camilli / Vilmot
15 October	SS3	Riba-roja 1	14.21 km	Østberg / Eriksen	Citroën C3 Rally2	8:57.0	Camilli / Vilmot
15 October	SS4	Vilaplana 2	20.00 km	Østberg / Eriksen	Citroën C3 Rally2	10:57.0	Østberg / Eriksen
15 October	SS5	La Granadella 2	21.80 km	Camilli / Vilmot	Citroën C3 Rally2	12:36.4	Camilli / Vilmot
15 October	SS6	Riba-roja 2	14.21 km	Camilli / Vilmot	Citroën C3 Rally2	9:02.9	Camilli / Vilmot
16 October	SS7	Savallà 1	14.08 km	Camilli / Vilmot	Citroën C3 Rally2	7:54.0	Camilli / Vilmot
16 October	SS8	Querol - Les Pobles 1	19.17 km	Østberg / Eriksen	Citroën C3 Rally2	11:08.2	Camilli / Vilmot
16 October	SS9	El Montmell 1	24.40 km	Suninen / Markkula	Hyundai i20 N Rally2	12:49.8	Camilli / Vilmot
16 October	SS10	Savallà 2	14.08 km	Østberg / Eriksen	Citroën C3 Rally2	7:52.0	Camilli / Vilmot
16 October	SS11	Querol - Les Pobles 2	19.17 km	Cais / Žáková	Ford Fiesta Rally2	11:04.6	Camilli / Vilmot
16 October	SS12	El Montmell 2	24.40 km	Suninen / Markkula	Hyundai i20 N Rally2	12:48.1	Camilli / Vilmot
16 October	SS13	Salou	2.24 km	Østberg / Eriksen	Citroën C3 Rally2	2:26.0	Camilli / Vilmot
17 October	SS14	Santa Marina 1	9.10 km	Camilli / Vilmot	Citroën C3 Rally2	5:25.3	Camilli / Vilmot
17 October	SS15	Riudecanyes 1	16.35 km	Østberg / Eriksen	Citroën C3 Rally2	10:39.9	Camilli / Vilmot
17 October	SS16	Santa Marina 2	9.10 km	Suninen / Markkula	Hyundai i20 N Rally2	5:22.2	Camilli / Vilmot
17 October	SS17	Riudecanyes 2 [Power Stage]	16.35 km	Østberg / Eriksen	Citroën C3 Rally2	10:40.7	Camilli / Vilmot

==== Championship standings ====
- **Bold text** indicates 2021 World Champions.

Pos.	Drivers' championships			Co-drivers' championships			Teams' championships		
Pos.	Move	Driver	Points	Move	Co-driver	Points	Move	Manufacturer	Points
1		**Andreas Mikkelsen**	126		Torstein Eriksen	126		Toksport WRT	211
2		Mads Østberg	126		Marcelo Der Ohannesian	104		Movisport	202
3		Marco Bulacia Wilkinson	104		Ola Fløene	98		M-Sport Ford WRT	146
4	2	Teemu Suninen	93	2	Mikko Markkula	93		Hyundai Motorsport N	73
5	1	Jari Huttunen	78	1	Mikko Lukka	78		Saintéloc Junior Team	27

=== World Rally Championship-3 ===
==== Classification ====
Position		No.	Driver	Co-driver	Entrant	Car	Time	Difference	Points		
Event	Class	No.	Driver	Co-driver	Entrant	Car	Time	Difference	Class	Stage	Event
12	1	32	Reeta Hämäläinen	Emil Lindholm	Reeta Hämäläinen	Škoda Fabia Rally2 evo	2:44:31.9	0.0	25	4	0
14	2	29	Kajetan Kajetanowicz	Maciej Szczepaniak	Kajetan Kajetanowicz	Škoda Fabia Rally2 evo	2:45:00.4	+28.5	18	5	0
17	3	35	Josh McErlean	James Fulton	Josh McErlean	Hyundai i20 R5	2:47:29.0	+2:57.1	15	2	0
18	4	39	Chris Ingram	Ross Whittock	Chris Ingram	Škoda Fabia Rally2 evo	2:47:46.0	+3:14.1	12	3	0
22	5	37	Armin Kremer	Ella Kremer	Armin Kremer	Škoda Fabia Rally2 evo	2:52:22.8	+7:50.9	10	1	0
23	6	31	Fabrizio Zaldivar	Carlos del Barrio	Fabrizio Zaldivar	Škoda Fabia Rally2 evo	2:53:36.8	+9:04.9	8	0	0
24	7	38	Mauro Miele	Luca Beltrame	Mauro Miele	Škoda Fabia Rally2 evo	2:54:23.7	+9:51.8	6	0	0
25	8	41	Neil Simpson	Michael Gibson	Neil Simpson	Škoda Fabia Rally2 evo	2:54:32.3	+10:00.4	4	0	0
26	9	43	Sebastian Perez	Gary McElhinney	Sebastian Perez	Ford Fiesta Rally2	2:55:52.7	+11:20.8	2	0	0
45	10	34	Mikko Heikkilä	Topi Luhtinen	Mikko Heikkilä	Škoda Fabia Rally2 evo	3:41:54.6	+57:22.7	1	0	0
Retired SS15		39	Miguel Díaz-Aboitiz	Diego Sanjuan de Eusebio	Miguel Díaz-Aboitiz	Škoda Fabia Rally2 evo	Mechanical		0	0	0
Retired SS14		32	Pepe López	Borja Rozada	Pepe López	Škoda Fabia Rally2 evo	Engine		0	0	0
Retired SS12		36	Jan Solans	Rodrigo Sanjuan de Eusebio	Jan Solans	Citroën C3 Rally2	Crash		0	0	0
Retired SS7		42	Dominik Stříteský	Jiří Hovorka	Dominik Stříteský	Škoda Fabia Rally2 evo	Crash		0	0	0

==== Special stages ====
Day	Stage	Stage name	Length	Winners	Car	Time	Class leaders
14 October	—	Coll de la Teixeta [Shakedown]	4.31 km	Hämäläinen / Lindholm	Škoda Fabia Rally2 evo	2:43.7	—N/a
15 October	SS1	Vilaplana 1	20.00 km	Hämäläinen / Lindholm	Škoda Fabia Rally2 evo	11:02.5	Hämäläinen / Lindholm
15 October	SS2	La Granadella 1	21.80 km	López / Rozada	Škoda Fabia Rally2 evo	12:39.1	Hämäläinen / Lindholm
15 October	SS3	Riba-roja 1	14.21 km	Kajetanowicz / Szczepaniak	Škoda Fabia Rally2 evo	9:00.0	Hämäläinen / Lindholm
15 October	SS4	Vilaplana 2	20.00 km	Hämäläinen / Lindholm	Škoda Fabia Rally2 evo	10:57.1	Hämäläinen / Lindholm
15 October	SS5	La Granadella 2	21.80 km	Hämäläinen / Lindholm	Škoda Fabia Rally2 evo	12:34.2	Hämäläinen / Lindholm
15 October	SS6	Riba-roja 2	14.21 km	López / Rozada	Škoda Fabia Rally2 evo	9:04.6	Hämäläinen / Lindholm
16 October	SS7	Savallà 1	14.08 km	Hämäläinen / Lindholm	Škoda Fabia Rally2 evo	7:54.7	Hämäläinen / Lindholm
16 October	SS8	Querol - Les Pobles 1	19.17 km	López / Rozada	Škoda Fabia Rally2 evo	11:10.2	Hämäläinen / Lindholm
16 October	SS9	El Montmell 1	24.40 km	Hämäläinen / Lindholm	Škoda Fabia Rally2 evo	12:58.8	Hämäläinen / Lindholm
16 October	SS10	Savallà 2	14.08 km	Hämäläinen / Lindholm	Škoda Fabia Rally2 evo	7:51.8	Hämäläinen / Lindholm
16 October	SS11	Querol - Les Pobles 2	19.17 km	López / Rozada	Škoda Fabia Rally2 evo	11:08.4	Hämäläinen / Lindholm
16 October	SS12	El Montmell 2	24.40 km	Hämäläinen / Lindholm	Škoda Fabia Rally2 evo	12:53.9	Hämäläinen / Lindholm
16 October	SS13	Salou	2.24 km	Kajetanowicz / Szczepaniak	Škoda Fabia Rally2 evo	2:27.0	Hämäläinen / Lindholm
17 October	SS14	Santa Marina 1	9.10 km	Ingram / Whittock	Škoda Fabia Rally2 evo	5:27.0	Hämäläinen / Lindholm
17 October	SS15	Riudecanyes 1	16.35 km	Kajetanowicz / Szczepaniak	Škoda Fabia Rally2 evo	10:40.0	Hämäläinen / Lindholm
17 October	SS16	Santa Marina 2	9.10 km	Ingram / Whittock	Škoda Fabia Rally2 evo	5:24.5	Hämäläinen / Lindholm
17 October	SS17	Riudecanyes 2 [Power Stage]	16.35 km	Kajetanowicz / Szczepaniak	Škoda Fabia Rally2 evo	10:42.9	Hämäläinen / Lindholm

==== Championship standings ====
- **Bold text** indicates 2021 World Champions.

Pos.	Drivers' championships			Co-drivers' championships		
Pos.	Move	Driver	Points	Move	Co-driver	Points
1	1	Kajetan Kajetanowicz	127		**Maciek Szczepaniak**	127
2	1	Yohan Rossel	127		Alexandre Coria	99
3		Emil Lindholm	73	3	Ross Whittock	64
4	3	Chris Ingram	64	1	Yannick Roche	57
5	1	Nicolas Ciamin	57	1	Reeta Hämäläinen	53

=== Junior World Rally Championship ===
==== Classification ====
Position		No.	Driver	Co-driver	Entrant	Car	Time	Difference	Points	
Event	Class	No.	Driver	Co-driver	Entrant	Car	Time	Difference	Class	Stage
28	1	48	Sami Pajari	Marko Salminen	Porvoon Autopalvelu	Ford Fiesta Rally4	2:58:02.5	0.0	50	4
29	2	51	Lauri Joona	Mikael Korhonen	Team Flying Finn	Ford Fiesta Rally4	2:58:18.4	+15.9	36	0
30	3	53	Robert Virves	Aleks Lesk	Autosport Team Estonia	Ford Fiesta Rally4	2:58:52.6	+50.1	30	5
42	4	49	Jon Armstrong	Phil Hall	Jon Armstrong	Ford Fiesta Rally4	3:31:54.3	+33:51.8	24	7
46	5	52	William Creighton	Liam Regan	Motorsport Ireland Rally Academy	Ford Fiesta Rally4	3:56:56.6	+58:54.1	20	1
47	6	50	Mārtiņš Sesks	Renārs Francis	LMT Autosporta Akademija	Ford Fiesta Rally4	3:58:12.2	+1:00:09.7	16	0

==== Special stages ====
Day	Stage	Stage name	Length	Winners	Car	Time	Class leaders
14 October	—	Coll de la Teixeta [Shakedown]	4.31 km	Armstrong / Hall	Ford Fiesta Rally4	2:58.1	—N/a
15 October	SS1	Vilaplana 1	20.00 km	Armstrong / Hall	Ford Fiesta Rally4	11:48.0	Armstrong / Hall
15 October	SS2	La Granadella 1	21.80 km	Armstrong / Hall	Ford Fiesta Rally4	13:34.3	Armstrong / Hall
15 October	SS3	Riba-roja 1	14.21 km	Pajari / Salminen	Ford Fiesta Rally4	9:45.1	Armstrong / Hall
15 October	SS4	Vilaplana 2	20.00 km	Armstrong / Hall	Ford Fiesta Rally4	11:41.6	Armstrong / Hall
15 October	SS5	La Granadella 2	21.80 km	Pajari / Salminen	Ford Fiesta Rally4	13:25.5	Armstrong / Hall
15 October	SS6	Riba-roja 2	14.21 km	Pajari / Salminen	Ford Fiesta Rally4	9:44.1	Armstrong / Hall
16 October	SS7	Savallà 1	14.08 km	Virves / Lesk	Ford Fiesta Rally4	8:29.3	Pajari / Salminen
16 October	SS8	Querol - Les Pobles 1	19.17 km	Virves / Lesk	Ford Fiesta Rally4	12:00.3	Pajari / Salminen
16 October	SS9	El Montmell 1	24.40 km	Armstrong / Hall	Ford Fiesta Rally4	13:42.6	Pajari / Salminen
16 October	SS10	Savallà 2	14.08 km	Armstrong / Hall	Ford Fiesta Rally4	8:24.5	Pajari / Salminen
16 October	SS11	Querol - Les Pobles 2	19.17 km	Virves / Lesk	Ford Fiesta Rally4	12:01.5	Pajari / Salminen
16 October	SS12	El Montmell 2	24.40 km	Creighton / Regan	Ford Fiesta Rally4	13:55.1	Pajari / Salminen
16 October	SS13	Salou	2.24 km	Virves / Lesk	Ford Fiesta Rally4	2:43.2	Pajari / Salminen
17 October	SS14	Santa Marina 1	9.10 km	Virves / Lesk	Ford Fiesta Rally4	5:49.8	Pajari / Salminen
17 October	SS15	Riudecanyes 1	16.35 km	Pajari / Salminen	Ford Fiesta Rally4	11:28.6	Pajari / Salminen
17 October	SS16	Santa Marina 2	9.10 km	Armstrong / Hall	Ford Fiesta Rally4	5:47.7	Pajari / Salminen
17 October	SS17	Riudecanyes 2	16.35 km	Armstrong / Hall	Ford Fiesta Rally4	11:30.9	Pajari / Salminen

==== Championship standings ====
- **Bold text** indicates 2021 World Champions.

Pos.	Drivers' championships			Co-drivers' championships			Trophy for nations		
Pos.	Move	Driver	Points	Move	Co-driver	Points	Move	Manufacturer	Points
1		**Sami Pajari**	145		**Marko Salminen**	119		**Finland**	101
2		Jon Armstrong	119		Phil Hall	107		United Kingdom	83
3		Mārtiņš Sesks	93		Renars Francis	85		Latvia	78
4		Lauri Joona	88		Liam Regan	56		Estonia	64
5	1	Robert Virves	78	3	Mikael Korhonen	42		Ireland	54

== Notes ==
Previous rally: 2021 Rally Finland	2021 FIA World Rally Championship	Next rally: 2021 Rally Monza
Previous rally: 2019 Rally Catalunya	2021 Rally Catalunya	Next rally: 2022 Rally Catalunya
