= 2021 Croatia Rally =

45th edition of Croatia Rally

2021 Croatia Rally Rally Croatia 2021
Round 3 of 12 in the 2021 World Rally Championship
← Previous event	Next event →
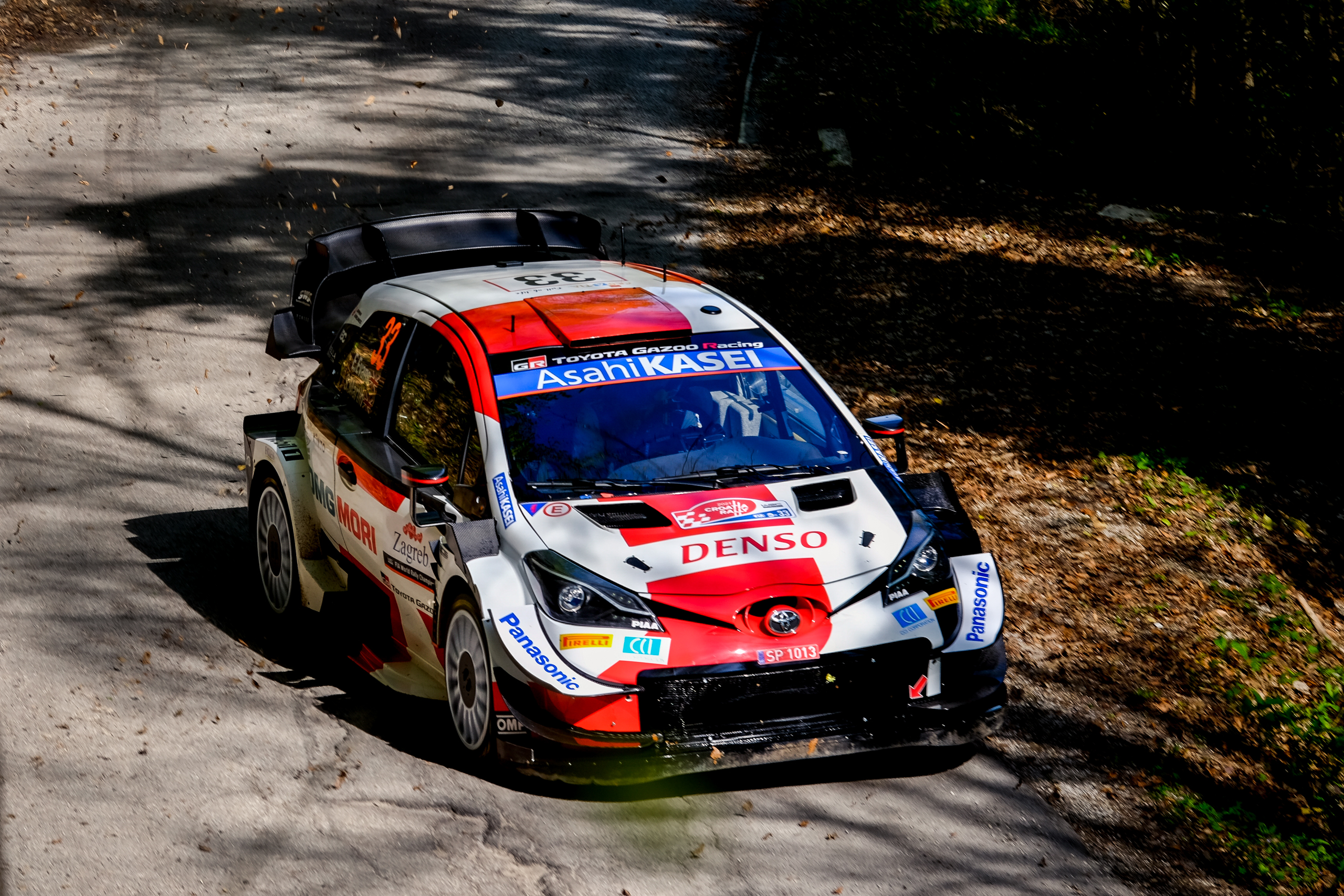
- Croatia became the 34th country to host a World Rally Championship round.
- Host country: Croatia
- Rally base: Zagreb, City of Zagreb Region
- Dates run: 22 – 25 April 2021
- Start location: Samobor, Zagreb County
- Finish location: Kumrovec, Krapina-Zagorje
- Stages: 20 (300.32 km; 186.61 miles)
- Stage surface: Tarmac
- Transport distance: 979.55 km (608.66 miles)
- Overall distance: 1,279.87 km (795.27 miles)

Statistics
- Crews registered: 68
- Crews: 65 at start, 55 at finish

Overall results
- Overall winner: (France) Sébastien Ogier (France) Julien Ingrassia (Japan) Toyota Gazoo Racing WRT; 2:51:22.9
- Power Stage winner: (France) Sébastien Ogier (France) Julien Ingrassia (Japan) Toyota Gazoo Racing WRT; 8:14.0

Support category results
- WRC-2 winner: (Norway) Mads Østberg (Norway) Torstein Eriksen (Hungary) TRT World Rally Team; 3:01:23.7
- WRC-3 winner: (Poland) Kajetan Kajetanowicz (Poland) Maciej Szczepaniak; 3:03:23.8
- J-WRC winner: (United Kingdom) Jon Armstrong (United Kingdom) Phil Hall; 3:15:07.6

The 2021 Croatia Rally (also known as the Rally Croatia 2021) was a motor racing event for rally cars that was held over four days between 22 and 25 April 2021. It marked the forty-fifth running of the Croatia Rally, and the first time the event has been run as a round of the World Rally Championship. The event was the third round of the 2021 World Rally Championship, World Rally Championship-2 and World Rally Championship-3. It was also the first round of the 2021 Junior World Rally Championship. The 2021 event was based in Zagreb in the City of Zagreb Region and was contested over twenty special stages totalling 300.32 km (186.61 mi) in competitive distance.

Sébastien Ogier and Julien Ingrassia won the rally with a 0.6-second advantage over teammate Elfyn Evans and Scott Martin, which was the third closest winning margin overall after the 2011 Jordan Rally and the 2007 Rally New Zealand. Mads Østberg and Torstein Eriksen won the World Rally Championship-2 category, while Kajetan Kajetanowicz and Maciej Szczepaniak won the World Rally Championship-3 category. The British crew of Jon Armstrong and Phil Hall was the winner in the junior class.

== Background ==
=== Championship standings prior to the event ===
Kalle Rovanperä and Jonne Halttunen entered the round with a four-point lead over Thierry Neuville and Martijn Wydaeghe. Reigning World Champions Sébastien Ogier and Julien Ingrassia were third, another four points behind. In the World Rally Championship for Manufacturers, Toyota Gazoo Racing WRT held an eleven-point lead over defending manufacturers' champions Hyundai Shell Mobis WRT, followed by M-Sport Ford WRT.

In the World Rally Championship-2 standings, Andreas Mikkelsen and Ola Fløene held a twenty-four-point lead ahead of Esapekka Lappi and Janne Ferm in the drivers' and co-drivers' standings respectively, with Adrien Fourmaux and Renaud Jamoul in third. In the teams' championship, Toksport WRT and Movisport co-led the standings, with M-Sport Ford WRT in third.

In the World Rally Championship-3 standings, the crew of Yohan Rossel and Benoît Fulcrand and of Teemu Asunmaa and Marko Salminen both led championships, with Egon Kaur and Silver Simm in third, trailing by five points.

=== Entry list ===
The following crews were entered into the rally. The event was open to crews competing in the World Rally Championship, its support categories, the World Rally Championship-2 and World Rally Championship-3, Junior World Rally Championship and privateer entries that were not registered to score points in any championship. Twelve entries for the World Rally Championship were received, as were seven in the World Rally Championship-2 and fifteen in the World Rally Championship-3. A further eight crews entered the Junior World Rally Championship in Ford Fiesta Rally4s.

Rally1 entries competing in the World Rally Championship
No.	Driver	Co-Driver	Entrant	Car	Tyre
1	(France) Sébastien Ogier	(France) Julien Ingrassia	(Japan) Toyota Gazoo Racing WRT	Toyota Yaris WRC	P
7	(France) Pierre-Louis Loubet	(France) Vincent Landais	(France) Hyundai 2C Competition	Hyundai i20 Coupe WRC	P
8	(Estonia) Ott Tänak	(Estonia) Martin Järveoja	(South Korea) Hyundai Shell Mobis WRT	Hyundai i20 Coupe WRC	P
11	(Belgium) Thierry Neuville	(Belgium) Martijn Wydaeghe	(South Korea) Hyundai Shell Mobis WRT	Hyundai i20 Coupe WRC	P
16	(France) Adrien Fourmaux	(Belgium) Renaud Jamoul	(United Kingdom) M-Sport Ford WRT	Ford Fiesta WRC	P
18	(Japan) Takamoto Katsuta	(United Kingdom) Daniel Barritt	(Japan) Toyota Gazoo Racing WRT	Toyota Yaris WRC	P
33	(United Kingdom) Elfyn Evans	(United Kingdom) Scott Martin	(Japan) Toyota Gazoo Racing WRT	Toyota Yaris WRC	P
42	(Republic of Ireland) Craig Breen	(Republic of Ireland) Paul Nagle	(South Korea) Hyundai Shell Mobis WRT	Hyundai i20 Coupe WRC	P
44	(United Kingdom) Gus Greensmith	(Republic of Ireland) Chris Patterson	(United Kingdom) M-Sport Ford WRT	Ford Fiesta WRC	P
53	(France) Armando Pereira	(France) Rémi Tutélaire	(France) Armando Pereira	Ford Fiesta WRC	P
54	(Croatia) Niko Pulić	(Croatia) Aleksandra Kovačić	(Croatia) Niko Pulić	Ford Fiesta WRC	—N/a
69	(Finland) Kalle Rovanperä	(Finland) Jonne Halttunen	(Japan) Toyota Gazoo Racing WRT	Toyota Yaris WRC	P

Rally2 entries competing in the World Rally Championship-2
No.	Driver	Co-Driver	Entrant	Car	Tyre
20	(Norway) Andreas Mikkelsen	(Norway) Ola Fløene	(Germany) Toksport WRT	Škoda Fabia R5 Evo	P
21	Nikolay Gryazin (Note: Nikolay Gryazin is Russian, but he competes as a neutral competitor using the designation RAF (Russian Automobile Federation), as the Court of Arbitration for Sport upheld a ban on Russia competing at World Championships. The ban was implemented by the World Anti-Doping Agency in response to state-sponsored doping program of Russian athletes.)	Konstantin Aleksandrov (Note: Konstantin Aleksandrov is Russian, but he competes as a neutral competitor using the designation RAF (Russian Automobile Federation), as the Court of Arbitration for Sport upheld a ban on Russia competing at World Championships. The ban was implemented by the World Anti-Doping Agency in response to state-sponsored doping program of Russian athletes.)	(Italy) Movisport	Volkswagen Polo GTI R5	P
22	(Bolivia) Marco Bulacia Wilkinson	(Argentina) Marcelo Der Ohannesian	(Germany) Toksport WRT	Škoda Fabia R5 Evo	P
23	(Italy) Enrico Brazzoli	(Italy) Maurizio Barone	(Italy) Movisport	Škoda Fabia R5	P
24	(Norway) Mads Østberg	(Norway) Torstein Eriksen	(Hungary) TRT World Rally Team	Citroën C3 Rally2	P
25	(Finland) Teemu Suninen	(Finland) Mikko Markkula	(United Kingdom) M-Sport Ford WRT	Ford Fiesta R5 Mk. II	P
26	(Sweden) Tom Kristensson	(Sweden) David Arhusiander	(United Kingdom) M-Sport Ford WRT	Ford Fiesta R5 Mk. II	P

Rally2 entries competing in the World Rally Championship-3 (Note: Under the Sporting Regulations, each car competing in the World Rally Championship-3 is entered under the driver's name.)
No.	Driver	Co-Driver	Entrant	Car	Tyre
27	(France) Yohan Rossel	(France) Alexandre Coria	(France) Yohan Rossel	Citroën C3 Rally2	P
28	(France) Nicolas Ciamin	(France) Yannick Roche	(France) Nicolas Ciamin	Citroën C3 Rally2	P
29	(Austria) Hermann Neubauer	(Austria) Bernhard Ettel	(Austria) Hermann Neubauer	Ford Fiesta R5 Mk. II	P
30	(Belgium) Cédric De Cecco	(Belgium) Jérôme Humblet	(Belgium) Cédric De Cecco	Škoda Fabia R5 Evo	P
31	(Austria) Johannes Keferböck	(Austria) Ilka Minor	(Austria) Johannes Keferböck	Škoda Fabia R5 Evo	P
32	(Poland) Kajetan Kajetanowicz	(Poland) Maciej Szczepaniak	(Poland) Kajetan Kajetanowicz	Škoda Fabia R5 Evo	P
34	(Finland) Emil Lindholm	(Finland) Mikael Korhonen	(Finland) Emil Lindholm	Škoda Fabia R5 Evo	P
35	(United Kingdom) Chris Ingram	(United Kingdom) Ross Whittock	(United Kingdom) Chris Ingram	Škoda Fabia R5 Evo	P
36	(Japan) Hiroki Arai	(Austria) Jürgen Heigl	(Japan) Hiroki Arai	Ford Fiesta R5 Mk. II	P
37	(Paraguay) Fabrizio Zaldívar	(Spain) Carlos del Barrio	(Paraguay) Fabrizio Zaldívar	Škoda Fabia R5 Evo	P
38	(Austria) Niki Mayr-Melnhof	(Austria) Poldi Welsersheimb	(Austria) Niki Mayr-Melnhof	Ford Fiesta R5 Mk. II	P
39	(Italy) Mauro Miele	(Italy) Luca Beltrame	(Italy) Mauro Miele	Škoda Fabia R5 Evo	P
40	(Belgium) Sébastien Bedoret	(Belgium) Thomas Walbrecq	(Belgium) Sébastien Bedoret	Škoda Fabia R5	P
41	(Slovenia) Aleš Zrinski	(Slovenia) Rok Vidmar	(Slovenia) AK Plamtex Sport	Ford Fiesta R5	P
43	(Austria) Kevin Raith	(Austria) Christoph Wögerer	(Austria) Kevin Raith	Ford Fiesta R5 Mk. II	P

Group Rally4 entries competing in the Junior World Rally Championship
No.	Driver	Co-Driver	Entrant	Car	Tyre
45	(Latvia) Mārtiņš Sesks	(Latvia) Francis Renars	(Latvia) LMT Autosporta Akademija	Ford Fiesta Rally4	P
46	(Finland) Sami Pajari	(Finland) Marko Salminen	(Finland) Porvoon Autopalvelu	Ford Fiesta Rally4	P
47	(Romania) Raul Badiu	(Romania) Rareș Fetean	(Romania) Raul Badiu	Ford Fiesta Rally4	P
48	(Slovakia) Martin Koči	(Czech Republic) Petr Těšínský	(Slovakia) Styllex Motorsport	Ford Fiesta Rally4	P
49	(United Kingdom) Jon Armstrong	(United Kingdom) Phil Hall	(United Kingdom) Jon Armstrong	Ford Fiesta Rally4	P
50	(Republic of Ireland) William Creighton	(Republic of Ireland) Liam Regan	(Republic of Ireland) Motorsport Ireland Rally Academy	Ford Fiesta Rally4	P
51	(Finland) Lauri Joona	(Finland) Ari Koponen	(Finland) Team Flying Finn	Ford Fiesta Rally4	P
52	(Estonia) Robert Virves	(Estonia) Sander Pruul	Autosport Team Estonia	Ford Fiesta Rally4	P

=== Route ===
==== Itinerary ====
All dates and times are CEST (UTC+2).

Leg	Date	Time	No.	Stage name	Distance
—N/a	22 April	09:01	—	Medvedgrad [Shakedown]	4.60 km
1	23 April	08:39	SS1	Rude – Plešivica 1	6.94 km
1	23 April	09:32	SS2	Kostanjevac – Petruš Vrh 1	23.76 km
1	23 April	10:35	SS3	Jaškovo – Mali Modruš Potok 1	10.10 km
1	23 April	11:38	SS4	Pećurkovo Brdo – Mrežnički Novaki 1	9.11 km
1	23 April	15:01	SS5	Rude – Plešivica 2	6.94 km
1	23 April	15:54	SS6	Kostanjevac – Petruš Vrh 2	23.76 km
1	23 April	16:57	SS7	Jaškovo – Mali Modruš Potok 2	10.10 km
1	23 April	18:00	SS8	Pećurkovo Brdo – Mrežnički Novaki 2	9.11 km
2	24 April	08:29	SS9	Mali Lipovec – Grdanjci 1	20.30 km
2	24 April	09:17	SS10	Stojdraga – Gornja Vas 1	20.77 km
2	24 April	10:10	SS11	Krašić – Vrškovac 1	11.11 km
2	24 April	11:08	SS12	Vinski Vrh – Duga Resa 1	8.78 km
2	24 April	14:29	SS13	Mali Lipovec – Grdanjci 2	20.30 km
2	24 April	15:17	SS14	Stojdraga – Gornja Vas 2	20.77 km
2	24 April	16:10	SS15	Krašić – Vrškovac 2	11.11 km
2	24 April	17:08	SS16	Vinski Vrh – Duga Resa 2	8.78 km
3	25 April	07:20	SS17	Bliznec – Pila 1	25.20 km
3	25 April	08:38	SS18	Zagorska Sela – Kumrovec 1	14.09 km
3	25 April	10:11	SS19	Bliznec – Pila 2	25.20 km
3	25 April	13:18	SS20	Zagorska Sela – Kumrovec 2 [Power Stage]	14.09 km

== Report ==
=== World Rally Cars ===
Neuville and Wydaeghe led the rally at the end of the first day, while Rovanpera crashed on the initial stage. Ogier took the 600th stage win of his World Rally Championship career.

==== Classification ====
Position		No.	Driver	Co-driver	Entrant	Car	Time	Difference	Points	
Event	Class	No.	Driver	Co-driver	Entrant	Car	Time	Difference	Event	Stage
1	1	1	Sébastien Ogier	Julien Ingrassia	Toyota Gazoo Racing WRT	Toyota Yaris WRC	2:51:22.9	0.0	25	5
2	2	33	Elfyn Evans	Scott Martin	Toyota Gazoo Racing WRT	Toyota Yaris WRC	2:51:23.5	+0.6	18	2
3	3	11	Thierry Neuville	Martijn Wydaeghe	Hyundai Shell Mobis WRT	Hyundai i20 Coupe WRC	2:51:31.0	+8.1	15	3
4	4	8	Ott Tänak	Martin Järveoja	Hyundai Shell Mobis WRT	Hyundai i20 Coupe WRC	2:52:48.0	+1:25.1	12	1
5	5	16	Adrien Fourmaux	Renaud Jamoul	M-Sport Ford WRT	Ford Fiesta WRC	2:54:32.6	+3:09.7	10	0
6	6	18	Takamoto Katsuta	Daniel Barritt	Toyota Gazoo Racing WRT	Toyota Yaris WRC	2:54:54.7	+3:31.8	8	0
7	7	44	Gus Greensmith	Chris Patterson	M-Sport Ford WRT	Ford Fiesta WRC	2:55:21.7	+3:58.8	6	0
8	8	42	Craig Breen	Paul Nagle	Hyundai Shell Mobis WRT	Hyundai i20 Coupe WRC	2:55:51.1	+4:28.2	4	4
29	9	7	Pierre-Louis Loubet	Vincent Landais	Hyundai 2C Competition	Hyundai i20 Coupe WRC	3:24:42.8	+33:19.9	0	0
35	10	53	Armando Pereira	Rémi Tutélaire	Armando Pereira	Ford Fiesta WRC	3:32:20.6	+40:57.7	0	0
Retired SS1		69	Kalle Rovanperä	Jonne Halttunen	Toyota Gazoo Racing WRT	Toyota Yaris WRC	Crash		0	0
Did not start		54	Niko Pulić	Aleksandra Kovačić	Niko Pulić	Ford Fiesta WRC	Withdrawn		0	0

==== Special stages ====
Day	Stage	Stage name	Length	Winners	Car	Time	Class leaders
22 April	—	Medvedgrad [Shakedown]	4.60 km	Evans / Martin	Toyota Yaris WRC	2:45.1	—N/a
23 April	SS1	Rude – Plešivica 1	6.94 km	Neuville / Wydaeghe	Hyundai i20 Coupe WRC	4:24.2	Neuville / Wydaeghe
23 April	SS2	Kostanjevac – Petruš Vrh 1	23.76 km	Neuville / Wydaeghe	Hyundai i20 Coupe WRC	12:58.6	Neuville / Wydaeghe
23 April	SS3	Jaškovo – Mali Modruš Potok 1	10.10 km	Ogier / Ingrassia; Evans / Martin	Toyota Yaris WRC; Toyota Yaris WRC	5:32.3	Neuville / Wydaeghe
23 April	SS4	Pećurkovo Brdo – Mrežnički Novaki 1	9.11 km	Neuville / Wydaeghe	Hyundai i20 Coupe WRC	4:51.9	Neuville / Wydaeghe
23 April	SS5	Rude – Plešivica 2	6.94 km	Tänak / Järveoja	Hyundai i20 Coupe WRC	4:30.4	Neuville / Wydaeghe
23 April	SS6	Kostanjevac – Petruš Vrh 2	23.76 km	Ogier / Ingrassia	Toyota Yaris WRC	12:55.8	Neuville / Wydaeghe
23 April	SS7	Jaškovo – Mali Modruš Potok 2	10.10 km	Ogier / Ingrassia	Toyota Yaris WRC	5:26.7	Neuville / Wydaeghe
23 April	SS8	Pećurkovo Brdo – Mrežnički Novaki 2	9.11 km	Ogier / Ingrassia	Toyota Yaris WRC	4:49.8	Neuville / Wydaeghe
24 April	SS9	Mali Lipovec – Grdanjci 1	20.30 km	Ogier / Ingrassia	Toyota Yaris WRC	12:26.1	Ogier / Ingrassia
24 April	SS10	Stojdraga – Gornja Vas 1	20.77 km	Katsuta / Barritt	Toyota Yaris WRC	12:36.9	Ogier / Ingrassia
24 April	SS11	Krašić – Vrškovac 1	11.11 km	Evans / Martin	Toyota Yaris WRC	5:36.8	Ogier / Ingrassia
24 April	SS12	Vinski Vrh – Duga Resa 1	8.78 km	Ogier / Ingrassia	Toyota Yaris WRC	4:37.6	Ogier / Ingrassia
24 April	SS13	Mali Lipovec – Grdanjci 2	20.30 km	Neuville / Wydaeghe	Hyundai i20 Coupe WRC	12:31.9	Ogier / Ingrassia
24 April	SS14	Stojdraga – Gornja Vas 2	20.77 km	Katsuta / Barritt	Toyota Yaris WRC	12:36.1	Ogier / Ingrassia
24 April	SS15	Krašić – Vrškovac 2	11.11 km	Ogier / Ingrassia; Neuville / Wydaeghe	Toyota Yaris WRC; Hyundai i20 Coupe WRC	5:32.1	Ogier / Ingrassia
24 April	SS16	Vinski Vrh – Duga Resa 2	8.78 km	Ogier / Ingrassia	Toyota Yaris WRC	4:36.6	Ogier / Ingrassia
25 April	SS17	Bliznec – Pila 1	25.20 km	Evans / Martin	Toyota Yaris WRC	14:04.5	Ogier / Ingrassia
25 April	SS18	Zagorska Sela – Kumrovec 1	14.09 km	Evans / Martin	Toyota Yaris WRC	8:18.4	Evans / Martin
25 April	SS19	Bliznec – Pila 2	25.20 km	Neuville / Wydaeghe	Hyundai i20 Coupe WRC	13:59.0	Evans / Martin
25 April	SS20	Zagorska Sela – Kumrovec 2 [Power Stage]	14.09 km	Ogier / Ingrassia	Toyota Yaris WRC	8:14.0	Ogier / Ingrassia

==== Championship standings ====
Pos.	Drivers' championships			Co-drivers' championships			Manufacturers' championships		
Pos.	Move	Driver	Points	Move	Co-driver	Points	Move	Manufacturer	Points
1	2	Sébastien Ogier	61	2	Julien Ingrassia	61		Toyota Gazoo Racing WRT	138
2		Thierry Neuville	53		Martijn Wydaeghe	53		Hyundai Shell Mobis WRT	111
3	1	Elfyn Evans	51	1	Scott Martin	51		M-Sport Ford WRT	42
4	1	Ott Tänak	40	1	Martin Järveoja	40		Hyundai 2C Competition	28
5	4	Kalle Rovanperä	39	4	Jonne Halttunen	39			

=== World Rally Championship-2 ===
==== Classification ====
Position		No.	Driver	Co-driver	Entrant	Car	Time	Difference	Points		
Event	Class	No.	Driver	Co-driver	Entrant	Car	Time	Difference	Class	Stage	Event
9	1	24	Mads Østberg	Torstein Eriksen	TRT World Rally Team	Citroën C3 Rally2	3:01:23.7	0.0	25	2	2
10	2	25	Teemu Suninen	Mikko Markkula	M-Sport Ford WRT	Ford Fiesta R5 Mk. II	3:01:52.2	+28.5	18	4	1
12	3	22	Marco Bulacia Wilkinson	Marcelo Der Ohannesian	Toksport WRT	Škoda Fabia R5 Evo	3:03:26.4	+2:02.7	15	3	0
33	4	23	Enrico Brazzoli	Maurizio Barone	Movisport	Škoda Fabia R5	3:30:34.0	+29:10.3	12	1	0
39	5	20	Andreas Mikkelsen	Ola Fløene	Toksport WRT	Škoda Fabia R5 Evo	3:41:05.9	+49:43.0	10	5	0
Retired SS19		21	Nikolay Gryazin	Konstantin Aleksandrov	Movisport	Volkswagen Polo GTI R5	Rolled		0	0	0
Retired SS9		26	Tom Kristensson	David Arhusiander	M-Sport Ford WRT	Ford Fiesta R5 Mk. II	Crash		0	0	0

==== Special stages ====
Day	Stage	Stage name	Length	Winners	Car	Time	Class leaders
22 April	—	Medvedgrad [Shakedown]	4.60 km	Suninen / Markkula	Ford Fiesta R5 Mk. II	2:55.8	—N/a
23 April	SS1	Rude – Plešivica 1	6.94 km	Gryazin / Aleksandrov	Volkswagen Polo GTI R5	4:39.6	Gryazin / Aleksandrov
23 April	SS2	Kostanjevac – Petruš Vrh 1	23.76 km	Østberg / Eriksen	Citroën C3 Rally2	13:48.4	Gryazin / Aleksandrov
23 April	SS3	Jaškovo – Mali Modruš Potok 1	10.10 km	Østberg / Eriksen	Citroën C3 Rally2	5:50.7	Østberg / Eriksen
23 April	SS4	Pećurkovo Brdo – Mrežnički Novaki 1	9.11 km	Østberg / Eriksen	Citroën C3 Rally2	5:08.7	Østberg / Eriksen
23 April	SS5	Rude – Plešivica 2	6.94 km	Mikkelsen / Fløene	Škoda Fabia R5 Evo	4:39.1	Østberg / Eriksen
23 April	SS6	Kostanjevac – Petruš Vrh 2	23.76 km	Gryazin / Aleksandrov	Volkswagen Polo GTI R5	13:44.6	Østberg / Eriksen
23 April	SS7	Jaškovo – Mali Modruš Potok 2	10.10 km	Østberg / Eriksen	Citroën C3 Rally2	5:48.8	Østberg / Eriksen
23 April	SS8	Pećurkovo Brdo – Mrežnički Novaki 2	9.11 km	Gryazin / Aleksandrov	Volkswagen Polo GTI R5	5:06.6	Østberg / Eriksen
24 April	SS9	Mali Lipovec – Grdanjci 1	20.30 km	Gryazin / Aleksandrov	Volkswagen Polo GTI R5	13:04.1	Østberg / Eriksen
24 April	SS10	Stojdraga – Gornja Vas 1	20.77 km	Suninen / Markkula	Ford Fiesta R5 Mk. II	13:17.8	Østberg / Eriksen
24 April	SS11	Krašić – Vrškovac 1	11.11 km	Gryazin / Aleksandrov	Volkswagen Polo GTI R5	5:58.1	Gryazin / Aleksandrov
24 April	SS12	Vinski Vrh – Duga Resa 1	8.78 km	Østberg / Eriksen	Citroën C3 Rally2	4:54.0	Østberg / Eriksen
24 April	SS13	Mali Lipovec – Grdanjci 2	20.30 km	Suninen / Markkula	Ford Fiesta R5 Mk. II	13:07.0	Østberg / Eriksen
24 April	SS14	Stojdraga – Gornja Vas 2	20.77 km	Gryazin / Aleksandrov	Volkswagen Polo GTI R5	13:13.1	Østberg / Eriksen
24 April	SS15	Krašić – Vrškovac 2	11.11 km	Gryazin / Aleksandrov	Volkswagen Polo GTI R5	5:55.4	Østberg / Eriksen
24 April	SS16	Vinski Vrh – Duga Resa 2	8.78 km	Gryazin / Aleksandrov	Volkswagen Polo GTI R5	4:55.6	Østberg / Eriksen
25 April	SS17	Bliznec – Pila 1	25.20 km	Gryazin / Aleksandrov	Volkswagen Polo GTI R5	14:52.1	Østberg / Eriksen
25 April	SS18	Zagorska Sela – Kumrovec 1	14.09 km	Mikkelsen / Fløene	Škoda Fabia R5 Evo	8:38.9	Østberg / Eriksen
25 April	SS19	Bliznec – Pila 2	25.20 km	Suninen / Markkula	Ford Fiesta R5 Mk. II	14:51.8	Østberg / Eriksen
25 April	SS20	Zagorska Sela – Kumrovec 2 [Power Stage]	14.09 km	Mikkelsen / Fløene	Škoda Fabia R5 Evo	8:29.2	Østberg / Eriksen

==== Championship standings ====
Pos.	Drivers' championships			Co-drivers' championships			Teams' championships		
Pos.	Move	Driver	Points	Move	Co-driver	Points	Move	Manufacturer	Points
1		Andreas Mikkelsen	68		Ola Fløene	68		Toksport WRT	100
2	5	Marco Bulacia Wilkinson	33	5	Marcelo Der Ohannesian	33		Movisport	85
3	1	Esapekka Lappi	29	1	Janne Ferm	29		M-Sport Ford WRT	43
4	New entry	Mads Østberg	27	New entry	Torstein Eriksen	27			
5	2	Adrien Fourmaux	25	2	Renaud Jamoul	25			

=== World Rally Championship-3 ===
==== Classification ====
Position		No.	Driver	Co-driver	Entrant	Car	Time	Difference	Points		
Event	Class	No.	Driver	Co-driver	Entrant	Car	Time	Difference	Class	Stage	Event
11	1	32	Kajetan Kajetanowicz	Maciej Szczepaniak	Kajetan Kajetanowicz	Škoda Fabia R5 Evo	3:03:23.8	0.0	25	3	0
13	2	34	Emil Lindholm	Mikael Korhonen	Emil Lindholm	Škoda Fabia R5 Evo	3:04:38.4	+1:14.6	18	2	0
14	3	27	Yohan Rossel	Alexandre Coria	Yohan Rossel	Citroën C3 Rally2	3:06:05.2	+2:41.4	15	5	0
15	4	28	Nicolas Ciamin	Yannick Roche	Nicolas Ciamin	Citroën C3 Rally2	3:06:28.4	+3:04.6	12	4	0
16	5	35	Chris Ingram	Ross Whittock	Chris Ingram	Škoda Fabia R5 Evo	3:07:48.2	+4:24.4	10	1	0
17	6	37	Fabrizio Zaldívar	Carlos del Barrio	Fabrizio Zaldívar	Škoda Fabia R5 Evo	3:14:28.7	+11:04.9	8	0	0
21	7	31	Johannes Keferböck	Ilka Minor	Johannes Keferböck	Škoda Fabia R5 Evo	3:16:15.9	+12:52.1	6	0	0
23	8	39	Mauro Miele	Luca Beltrame	Mauro Miele	Škoda Fabia R5 Evo	3:17:58.7	+14:34.9	4	0	0
27	9	43	Kevin Raith	Christoph Wögerer	Kevin Raith	Ford Fiesta R5 Mk. II	3:20:31.1	+17:07.3	2	0	0
38	10	40	Sébastien Bedoret	Thomas Walbrecq	Sébastien Bedoret	Škoda Fabia R5	3:39:07.0	+35:43.2	1	0	0
Retired SS9		38	Niki Mayr-Melnhof	Poldi Welsersheimb	Niki Mayr-Melnhof	Ford Fiesta R5 Mk. II	Engine		0	0	0
Retired SS7		30	Cédric De Cecco	Jérôme Humblet	Cédric De Cecco	Škoda Fabia R5 Evo	Crash		0	0	0
Retired SS6		29	Hermann Neubauer	Bernhard Ettel	Hermann Neubauer	Ford Fiesta R5 Mk. II	Crash		0	0	0
Retired SS6		36	Hiroki Arai	Jürgen Heigl	Hiroki Arai	Ford Fiesta R5 Mk. II	Crash		0	0	0

==== Special stages ====
Day	Stage	Stage name	Length	Winners	Car	Time	Class leaders
22 April	—	Medvedgrad [Shakedown]	4.60 km	Ciamin / Roche	Citroën C3 Rally2	2:56.0	—N/a
23 April	SS1	Rude – Plešivica 1	6.94 km	Rossel / Coria	Citroën C3 Rally2	4:44.4	Rossel / Coria
23 April	SS2	Kostanjevac – Petruš Vrh 1	23.76 km	Rossel / Coria	Citroën C3 Rally2	14:11.7	Rossel / Coria
23 April	SS3	Jaškovo – Mali Modruš Potok 1	10.10 km	Mayr-Melnhof / Welsersheimb	Ford Fiesta R5 Mk. II	6:02.1	Rossel / Coria
23 April	SS4	Pećurkovo Brdo – Mrežnički Novaki 1	9.11 km	Lindholm / Korhonen	Škoda Fabia R5 Evo	5:07.2	Rossel / Coria
23 April	SS5	Rude – Plešivica 2	6.94 km	Rossel / Coria	Citroën C3 Rally2	4:40.2	Rossel / Coria
23 April	SS6	Kostanjevac – Petruš Vrh 2	23.76 km	Kajetanowicz / Szczepaniak	Škoda Fabia R5 Evo	13:51.6	Rossel / Coria
23 April	SS7	Jaškovo – Mali Modruš Potok 2	10.10 km	Lindholm / Korhonen	Škoda Fabia R5 Evo	5:54.3	Kajetanowicz / Szczepaniak
23 April	SS8	Pećurkovo Brdo – Mrežnički Novaki 2	9.11 km	Lindholm / Korhonen	Škoda Fabia R5 Evo	5:06.6	Rossel / Coria
24 April	SS9	Mali Lipovec – Grdanjci 1	20.30 km	Rossel / Coria	Citroën C3 Rally2	13:18.8	Rossel / Coria
24 April	SS10	Stojdraga – Gornja Vas 1	20.77 km	Rossel / Coria	Citroën C3 Rally2	13:22.2	Rossel / Coria
24 April	SS11	Krašić – Vrškovac 1	11.11 km	Kajetanowicz / Szczepaniak	Škoda Fabia R5 Evo	5:59.4	Kajetanowicz / Szczepaniak
24 April	SS12	Vinski Vrh – Duga Resa 1	8.78 km	Kajetanowicz / Szczepaniak	Škoda Fabia R5 Evo	4:56.0	Kajetanowicz / Szczepaniak
24 April	SS13	Mali Lipovec – Grdanjci 2	20.30 km	Rossel / Coria	Citroën C3 Rally2	13:14.7	Kajetanowicz / Szczepaniak
24 April	SS14	Stojdraga – Gornja Vas 2	20.77 km	Ciamin / Roche	Citroën C3 Rally2	13:18.2	Kajetanowicz / Szczepaniak
24 April	SS15	Krašić – Vrškovac 2	11.11 km	Lindholm / Korhonen	Škoda Fabia R5 Evo	5:55.1	Kajetanowicz / Szczepaniak
24 April	SS16	Vinski Vrh – Duga Resa 2	8.78 km	Kajetanowicz / Szczepaniak	Škoda Fabia R5 Evo	4:54.2	Kajetanowicz / Szczepaniak
25 April	SS17	Bliznec – Pila 1	25.20 km	Ciamin / Roche	Citroën C3 Rally2	15:02.3	Kajetanowicz / Szczepaniak
25 April	SS18	Zagorska Sela – Kumrovec 1	14.09 km	Ciamin / Roche	Citroën C3 Rally2	8:52.7	Kajetanowicz / Szczepaniak
25 April	SS19	Bliznec – Pila 2	25.20 km	Stage cancelled			
25 April	SS20	Zagorska Sela – Kumrovec 2 [Power Stage]	14.09 km	Rossel / Coria	Citroën C3 Rally2	8:36.9	Kajetanowicz / Szczepaniak

==== Championship standings ====
Pos.	Drivers' championships			Co-drivers' championships		
Pos.	Move	Driver	Points	Move	Co-driver	Points
1		Yohan Rossel	48	4	Yannick Roche	36
2	3	Nicolas Ciamin	36	1	Benoît Fulcrand	28
3	1	Teemu Asunmaa	28	1	Marko Salminen	28
4	New entry	Kajetan Kajetanowicz	28	New entry	Maciek Szczepaniak	28
5	2	Egon Kaur	23	2	Silver Simm	23

=== Junior World Rally Championship ===
==== Classification ====
Position		No.	Driver	Co-driver	Entrant	Car	Time	Difference	Points	
Event	Class	No.	Driver	Co-driver	Entrant	Car	Time	Difference	Class	Stage
18	1	49	Jon Armstrong	Phil Hall	Jon Armstrong	Ford Fiesta Rally4	3:15:07.6	0.0	25	2
19	2	45	Mārtiņš Sesks	Francis Renars	LMT Autosporta Akademija	Ford Fiesta Rally4	3:15:41.1	+33.5	18	0
20	3	51	Lauri Joona	Ari Koponen	Team Flying Finn	Ford Fiesta Rally4	3:15:56.4	+48.8	15	1
22	4	48	Martin Koči	Petr Těšínský	Styllex Motorsport	Ford Fiesta Rally4	3:17:53.7	+2:46.1	12	3
24	5	50	William Creighton	Liam Regan	Motorsport Ireland Rally Academy	Ford Fiesta Rally4	3:18:43.1	+3:35.5	10	0
22	6	48	Sami Pajari	Marko Salminen	Porvoon Autopalvelu	Ford Fiesta Rally4	3:18:44.3	+3:36.7	8	9
51	7	52	Robert Virves	Sander Pruul	Autosport Team Estonia	Ford Fiesta Rally4	4:28:31.9	+1:13:24.3	6	0
53	8	47	Raul Badiu	Rareș Fetean	Raul Badiu	Ford Fiesta Rally4	4:37:40.2	+1:22:32.6	4	3

==== Special stages ====
Day	Stage	Stage name	Length	Winners	Car	Time	Class leaders
22 April	—	Medvedgrad [Shakedown]	4.60 km	Badiu / Fetean	Ford Fiesta Rally4	3:09.1	—N/a
23 April	SS1	Rude – Plešivica 1	6.94 km	Badiu / Fetean	Ford Fiesta Rally4	5:01.5	Badiu / Fetean
23 April	SS2	Kostanjevac – Petruš Vrh 1	23.76 km	Pajari / Salminen	Ford Fiesta Rally4	14:43.2	Pajari / Salminen
23 April	SS3	Jaškovo – Mali Modruš Potok 1	10.10 km	Badiu / Fetean	Ford Fiesta Rally4	6:17.5	Koči / Těšínský
23 April	SS4	Pećurkovo Brdo – Mrežnički Novaki 1	9.11 km	Koči / Těšínský	Ford Fiesta Rally4	5:28.6	Koči / Těšínský
23 April	SS5	Rude – Plešivica 2	6.94 km	Pajari / Salminen	Ford Fiesta Rally4	4:59.2	Koči / Těšínský
23 April	SS6	Kostanjevac – Petruš Vrh 2	23.76 km	Stage cancelled			
23 April	SS7	Jaškovo – Mali Modruš Potok 2	10.10 km	Pajari / Salminen	Ford Fiesta Rally4	6:09.9	Koči / Těšínský
23 April	SS8	Pećurkovo Brdo – Mrežnički Novaki 2	9.11 km	Joona / Koponen	Ford Fiesta Rally4	5:30.5	Koči / Těšínský
24 April	SS9	Mali Lipovec – Grdanjci 1	20.30 km	Koči / Těšínský	Ford Fiesta Rally4	14:19.6	Koči / Těšínský
24 April	SS10	Stojdraga – Gornja Vas 1	20.77 km	Armstrong / Hall	Ford Fiesta Rally4	14:15.2	Koči / Těšínský
24 April	SS11	Krašić – Vrškovac 1	11.11 km	Pajari / Salminen	Ford Fiesta Rally4	6:21.6	Koči / Těšínský
24 April	SS12	Vinski Vrh – Duga Resa 1	8.78 km	Pajari / Salminen	Ford Fiesta Rally4	5:15.3	Koči / Těšínský
24 April	SS13	Mali Lipovec – Grdanjci 2	20.30 km	Pajari / Salminen	Ford Fiesta Rally4	14:07.1	Koči / Těšínský
24 April	SS14	Stojdraga – Gornja Vas 2	20.77 km	Armstrong / Hall	Ford Fiesta Rally4	14:04.1	Armstrong / Hall
24 April	SS15	Krašić – Vrškovac 2	11.11 km	Pajari / Salminen	Ford Fiesta Rally4	6:15.4	Armstrong / Hall
24 April	SS16	Vinski Vrh – Duga Resa 2	8.78 km	Pajari / Salminen	Ford Fiesta Rally4	5:11.4	Armstrong / Hall
25 April	SS17	Bliznec – Pila 1	25.20 km	Koči / Těšínský	Ford Fiesta Rally4	16:03.2	Armstrong / Hall
25 April	SS18	Zagorska Sela – Kumrovec 1	14.09 km	Pajari / Salminen	Ford Fiesta Rally4	9:15.7	Armstrong / Hall
25 April	SS19	Bliznec – Pila 2	25.20 km	Stage cancelled			
25 April	SS20	Zagorska Sela – Kumrovec 2	14.09 km	Badiu / Fetean	Ford Fiesta Rally4	9:13.1	Armstrong / Hall

==== Championship standings ====
Pos.	Drivers' championships			Co-drivers' championships			Trophy for nations		
Pos.	Move	Driver	Points	Move	Co-driver	Points	Move	Manufacturer	Points
1	New entry	Jon Armstrong	27	New entry	Phil Hall	27	New entry	United Kingdom	25
2	New entry	Mārtiņš Sesks	18	New entry	Renars Francis	18	New entry	Latvia	18
3	New entry	Sami Pajari	17	New entry	Marko Salminen	17	New entry	Finland	15
4	New entry	Lauri Joona	16	New entry	Ari Koponen	16	New entry	Slovakia	12
5	New entry	Martin Koči	15	New entry	Petr Těšínský	15	New entry	Ireland	10

== Notes ==
Previous rally: 2021 Arctic Rally Finland	2021 FIA World Rally Championship	Next rally: 2021 Rally de Portugal
Previous rally: 2017 Croatia Rally; 2018 event cancelled	2021 Croatia Rally	Next rally: 2022 Croatia Rally
