= Florian Haut-Labourdette =

French rally co-driver (born 1992)

Personal information
- Nationality: (France) French
- Born: October 4, 1992 (age 34)

World Rally Championship record
- Years active: 2012, 2021, 2023
- Driver: (France) Bruno Riberi (France) Pierre-Louis Loubet
- Teams: Hyundai 2C Competition
- Rallies: 7
- Championships: 0
- Rally wins: 0
- Podiums: 0
- Stage wins: 0
- First rally: 2012 Monte Carlo Rally
- Last rally: 2023 Monte Carlo Rally

Florian Haut-Labourdette (born 4 October 1992) is a French rally co-driver. He is the co-driver of the French rally driver Pierre-Louis Loubet, racing for Hyundai 2C Competition in the World Rally Championship.

== Rally career ==
Haut-Labourdette made his WRC debut at the 2012 Monte Carlo Rally. He is set to co-drive with Pierre-Louis Loubet at the 2021 Rally de Portugal, replacing Vincent Landais.

== Rally results ==
=== Complete WRC results ===
Year	Entrant	Car	1	2	3	4	5	6	7	8	9	10	11	12	13	WDC	Points
2012	Bruno Riberi	Peugeot 207 RC R3T	MON; 39	SWE	MEX	POR	ARG	GRE	NZL	FIN	GER	GBR	FRA	ITA	ESP	NC	0
2021	Hyundai 2C Competition	Hyundai i20 Coupe WRC	MON	ARC	CRO	POR; Ret	ITA; Ret	KEN; WD	EST; 7	BEL; 68	GRE; Ret	FIN	ESP; WD	MNZ		22nd	6
2023	Bruno Riberi	Škoda Fabia Rally2 evo	MON; 23	SWE	MEX	CRO	POR	ITA	KEN	EST	FIN	GRE	CHL	EUR	JAP	NC	0
