= 2021 World Rally Championship =

49th running of the World Rally Championship

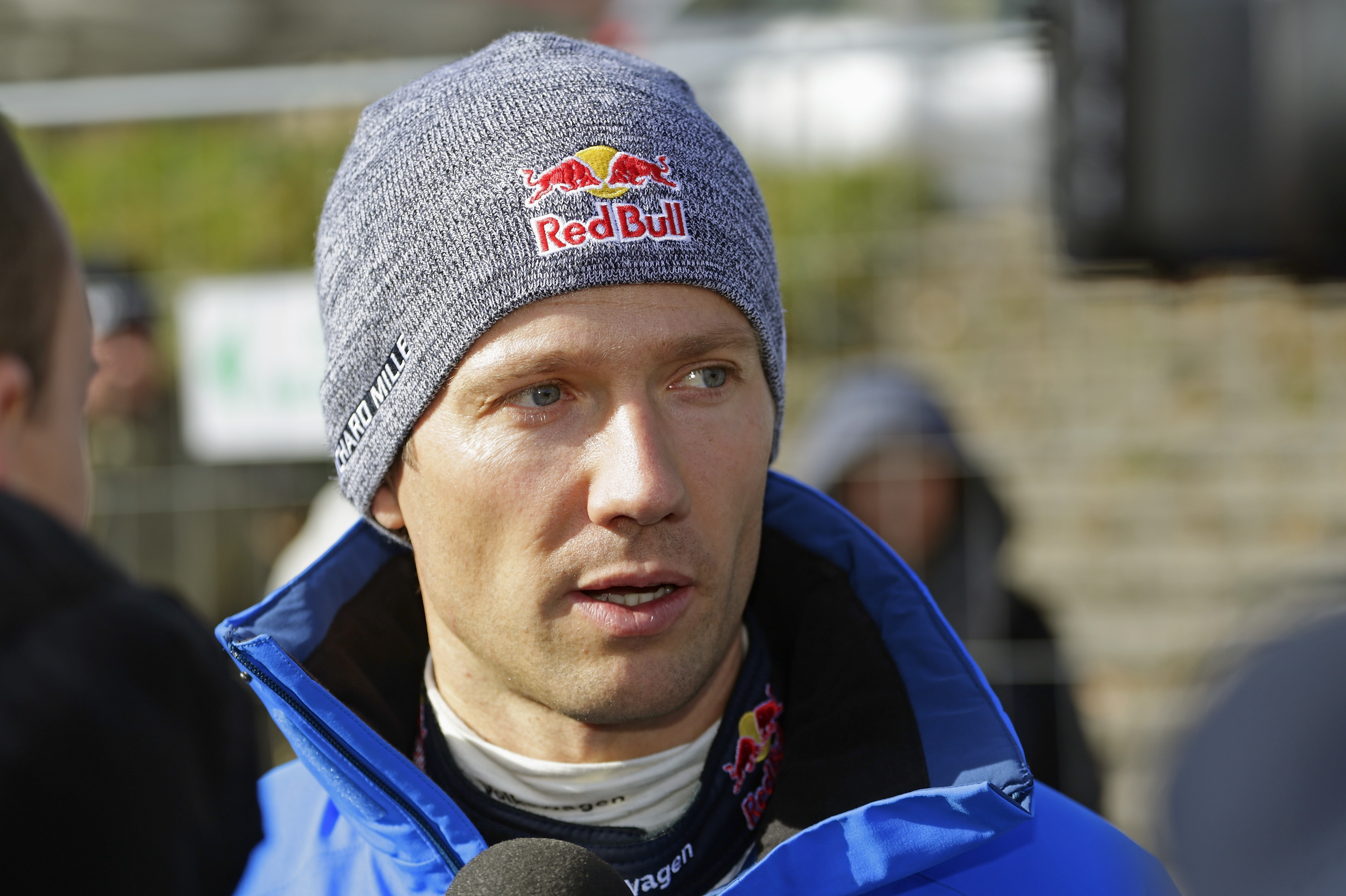
Sébastien Ogier won his eighth drivers' championship title.

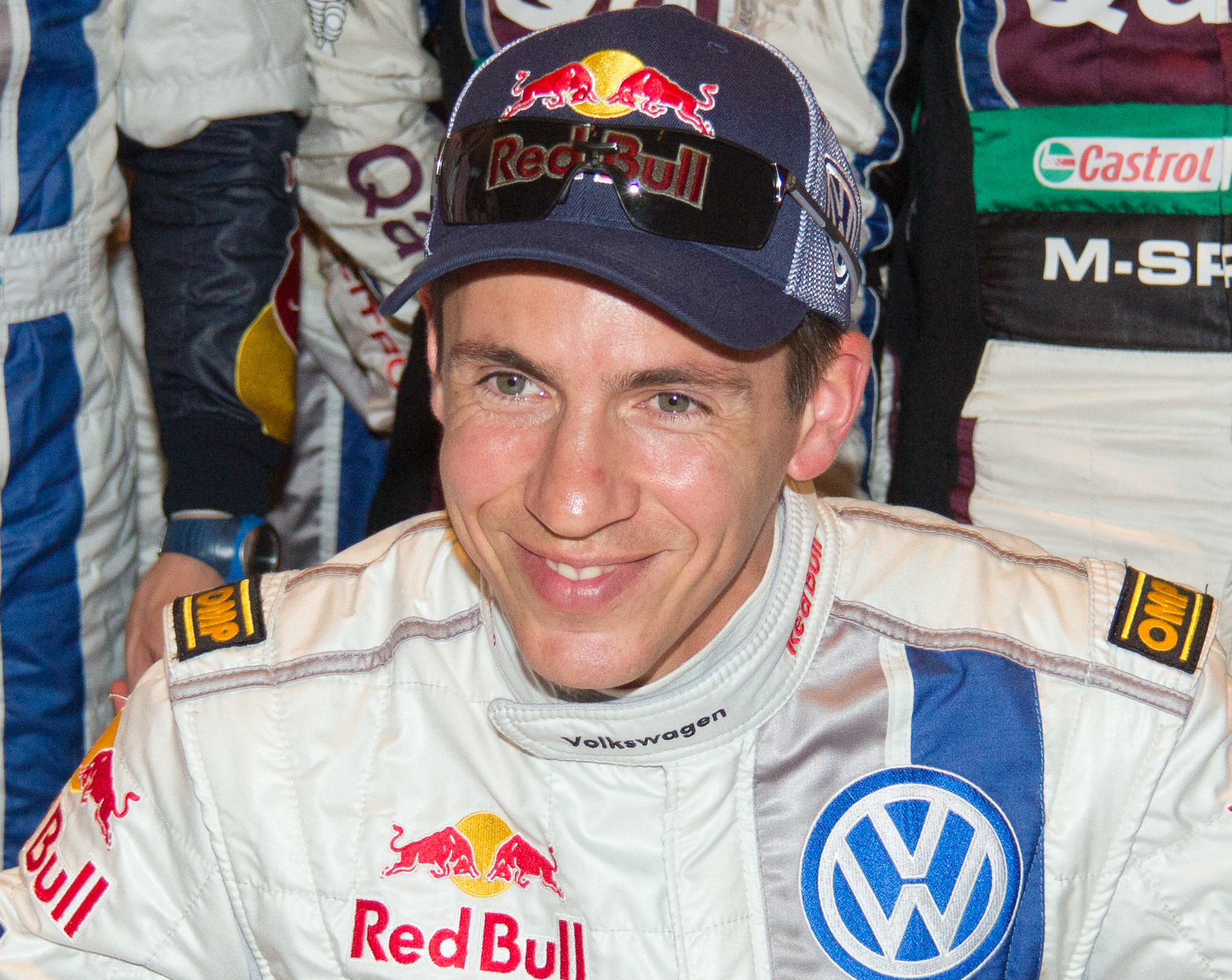
Julien Ingrassia won his eighth co-drivers' championship title.

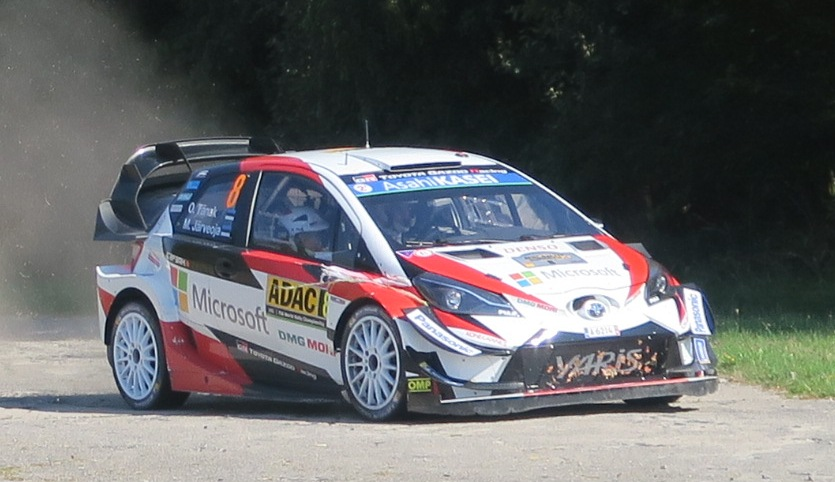
Toyota Gazoo Racing WRT (Yaris WRC pictured) claimed the manufacturers' title.

The 2021 FIA World Rally Championship was the forty-ninth season of the World Rally Championship, a rallying competition organised by the Fédération Internationale de l'Automobile (FIA). Teams and crews competed in twelve rallies for the World Rally Championships for Drivers, Co-drivers and Manufacturers. Crews were free to compete in cars complying with World Rally Car, Rally Pyramid and Group R regulations; however, only manufacturers competing with World Rally Cars homologated under regulations introduced in 2017 were eligible to score points in the Manufacturers' championship. The championship began in January 2021 with the Rallye Monte-Carlo and concluded in November 2021 with Rally Monza. The series was supported by WRC2 and WRC3 categories at every round of the championship and by the Junior WRC at selected events.

Sébastien Ogier and Julien Ingrassia were the defending drivers' and co-drivers' champions, having secured their seventh championship titles at the 2020 Rally Monza. Hyundai were the defending manufacturers' champions and were defending their manufacturers' title for the second consecutive year.

At the conclusion of the championship, Ogier and Ingrassia won their eighth world titles after winning the 2021 Rally Monza. Elfyn Evans and Scott Martin finished second, trailing by twenty-three points. Thierry Neuville and Martijn Wydaeghe were third, a further thirty-one points behind. In the manufacturers' championship, Toyota Gazoo Racing WRT clinched the title, a massive fifty-nine-point lead over the defending manufacturer champion Hyundai Shell Mobis WRT, with M-Sport Ford WRT in third.

== Calendar ==
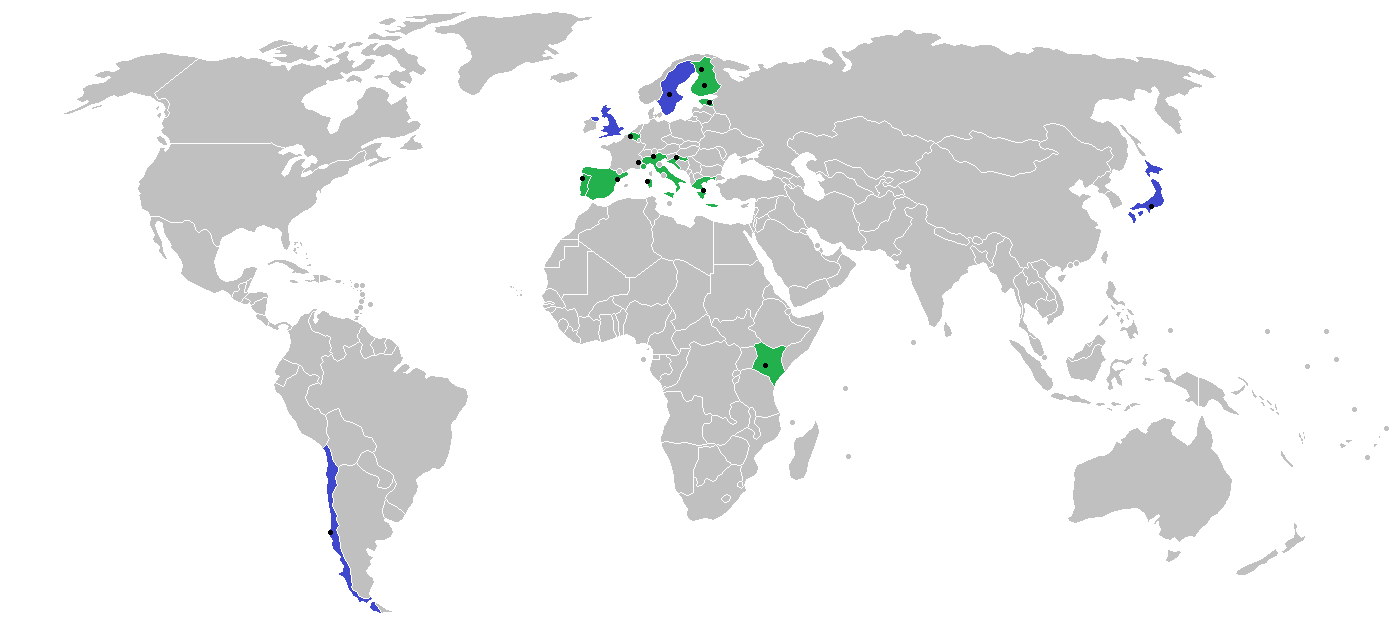
A map showing the locations of the rallies in the 2021 championship. Contested events are in green, while cancelled events are in blue. Event headquarters are marked with a black dot.

The 2021 championship was contested over twelve rounds in Europe and Africa:

Round	Start date	Finish date	Rally	Rally headquarters	Surface	Stages	Distance	Ref.
1	21 January	24 January	(Monaco) Rallye Automobile Monte Carlo	Gap, Provence-Alpes-Côte d'Azur (Note: The rally base of the Monte Carlo Rally was located in France.)	Mixed (Note: The Monte Carlo Rally was run on a tarmac and snow surface.)	14	257.64 km	
2	26 February	28 February	Arctic Rally Finland	Rovaniemi, Lapland	Snow	10	251.08 km	
3	22 April	25 April	Croatia Rally	Zagreb	Tarmac	20	300.32 km	
4	20 May	23 May	Rally de Portugal	Matosinhos, Porto	Gravel	20	337.51 km	
5	3 June	6 June	(Italy) Rally Italia Sardegna	Olbia, Sardinia	Gravel	20	303.10 km	
6	24 June	27 June	Safari Rally Kenya	Nairobi	Gravel	18	320.19 km	
7	15 July	18 July	Rally Estonia	Tartu, Tartu County	Gravel	24	314.16 km	
8	13 August	15 August	Ypres Rally Belgium	Ypres, West Flanders	Tarmac	20	295.78 km	
9	9 September	12 September	Acropolis Rally Greece	Lamia, Central Greece	Gravel	15	292.19 km	
10	1 October	3 October	Rally Finland	Jyväskylä, Central Finland	Gravel	19	287.11 km	
11	14 October	17 October	(Spain) RACC Rally Catalunya de España	Salou, Catalonia	Tarmac	17	280.46 km	
12	18 November	21 November	(Italy) ACI Rally Monza	Monza, Lombardy	Tarmac	16	253.18 km	

The following rounds were included on the original calendar published by WRC Promoter GmbH, but were later cancelled:

Start date	Finish date	Rally	Rally headquarters	Surface	Stages	Distance	Cancellation reason	Ref.
11 February	14 February	Rally Sweden	Torsby, Värmland	Snow	19	313.81 km	COVID-19 pandemic	
9 September	12 September	Rally Chile	Concepción, Biobío	Gravel	—N/a	—N/a	COVID-19 pandemic	
19 August	22 August	(United Kingdom) Rally GB	—N/a	—N/a	—N/a	—N/a	Financial issues	
11 November	14 November	Rally Japan	Nagoya, Chūbu	Tarmac	20	300.11 km	COVID-19 pandemic	

=== Calendar changes ===
With the addition of Rally Chile to the calendar in 2019, the FIA opened the tender process for new events to join the championship in 2020. Three events were successful, (Note: Rally New Zealand was successful in its bid to join the championship, but was cancelled because of the pandemic. It was not included on the 2021 calendar, but a separate, later bid from Rally Croatia was also successful.) but the championship was affected by a series of cancellations in 2019 and 2020 that necessitated changes to the 2021 calendar:

- Rally Catalunya returned to the championship. The rally was removed from the 2020 schedule as part of an event-sharing agreement that would see it removed from the calendar for one year, but was guaranteed a spot on the calendar for the next two. The rally returned to running exclusively on tarmac roads for the first time since 2009. (Note: Rally Catalunya had previously been run as a mixed surface rally, with the first leg of the event held on gravel roads and the final two legs on tarmac.)

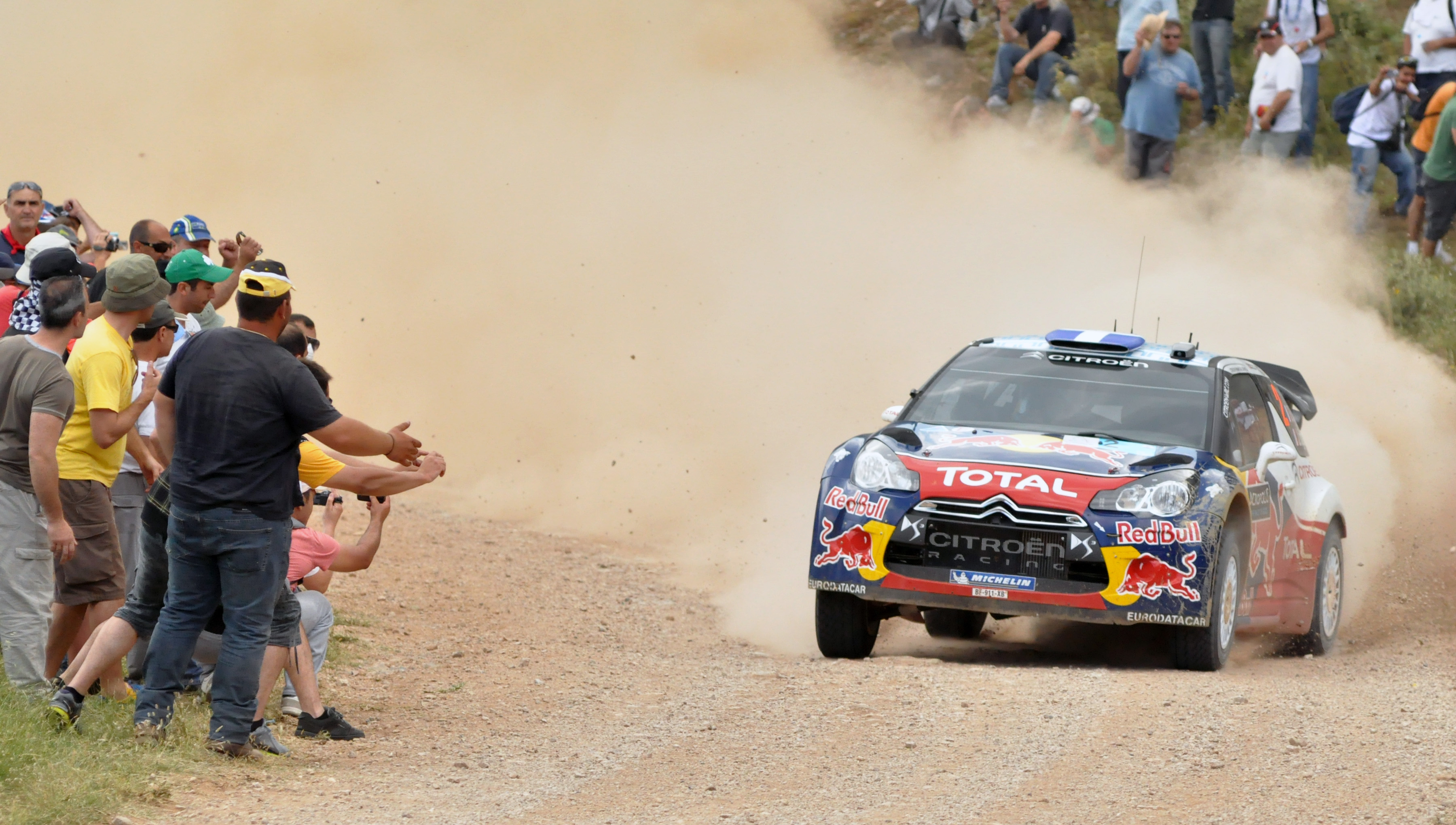
The Acropolis Rally of Greece returned to the championship for the first time since 2013.

- Rally Chile was due to return after a one-year absence. The rally had been included on the original draft of the 2020 calendar, but was later cancelled in the face of ongoing civil unrest in the country. Organisers of the event negotiated a return to the calendar for the 2021 championship, but it was again cancelled due to continued travel and other restrictions amid the COVID-19 pandemic. Acropolis Rally replaced the rally after a seven-year absence on the calendar.
- Rally Croatia made its championship debut, replacing Rally Mexico. Croatia thus became the 34th country to host a World Rally Championship round. It was based in Zagreb, and ran on tarmac roads.
- Rally Deutschland was removed from the calendar. The event had planned to run in 2020, but was cancelled due to the COVID-19 pandemic. It was not included on the 2021 calendar.
- The Rallies of Finland and Portugal also returned to the championship after a one-year absence. The 2020 events were cancelled in response to the COVID-19 pandemic.

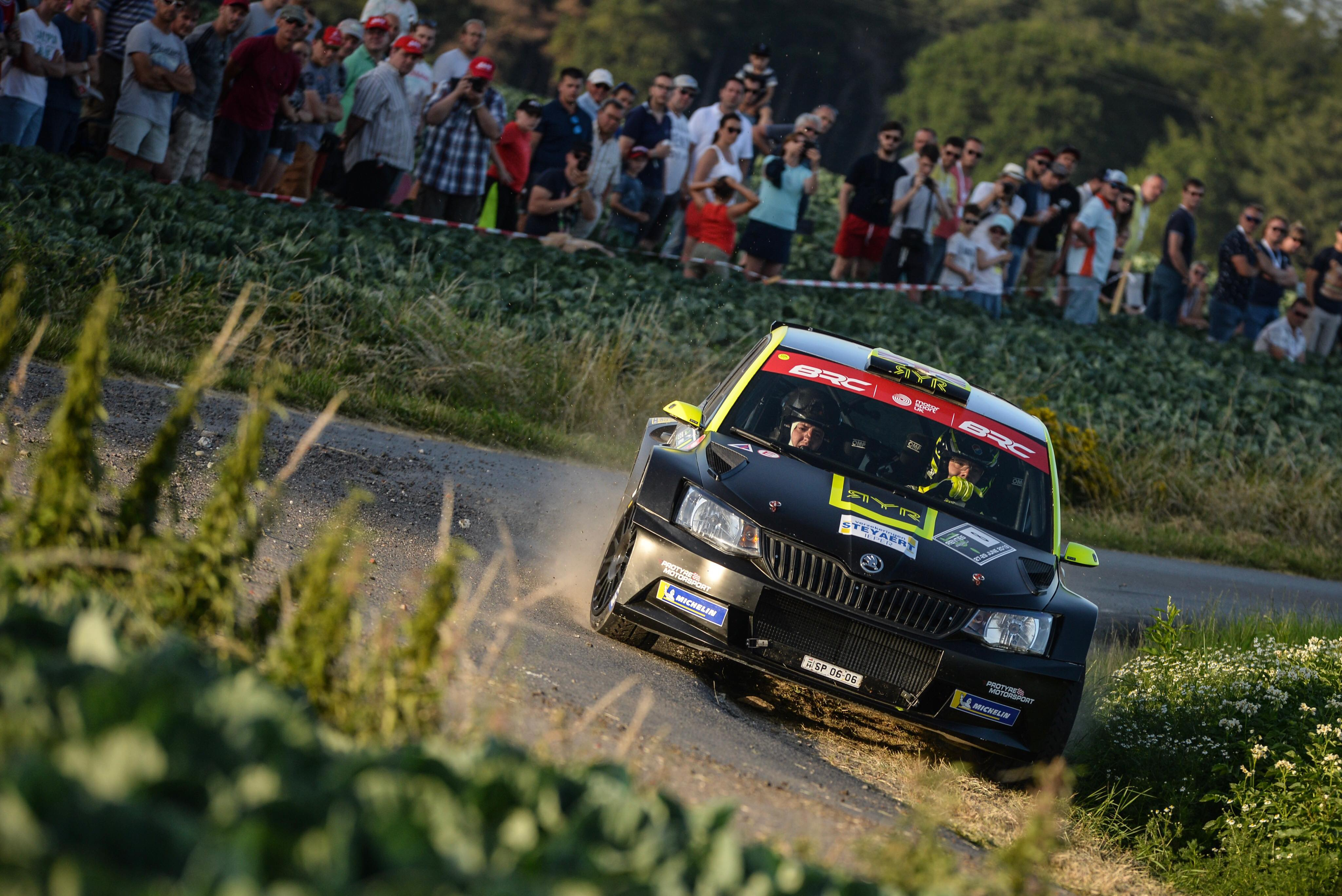
The Ypres Rally's debut made Belgium the 35th nation to hold a World Rally Championship event.

- Rally GB was replaced by the Ypres Rally in Belgium. Rally GB had originally planned to move from Wales to Northern Ireland, but the event was replaced when organisers were unable to come to an agreement with the government of Northern Ireland to support the rally.
- Rally Japan was scheduled to return to the calendar for the first time since 2010, but it was ultimately called off due to the COVID-19 pandemic. The rally was also originally included on the 2020 calendar, but was also cancelled because of the pandemic. Rally Monza was confirmed to hold the season finale for the second year in a row.
- The Safari Rally was run as a World Championship event for the first time since 2002. The event was based in the Kenyan capital Nairobi and featured stages around Lake Naivasha. The event had been planned to make its return to the championship in 2020, but was cancelled in response to the COVID-19 pandemic.

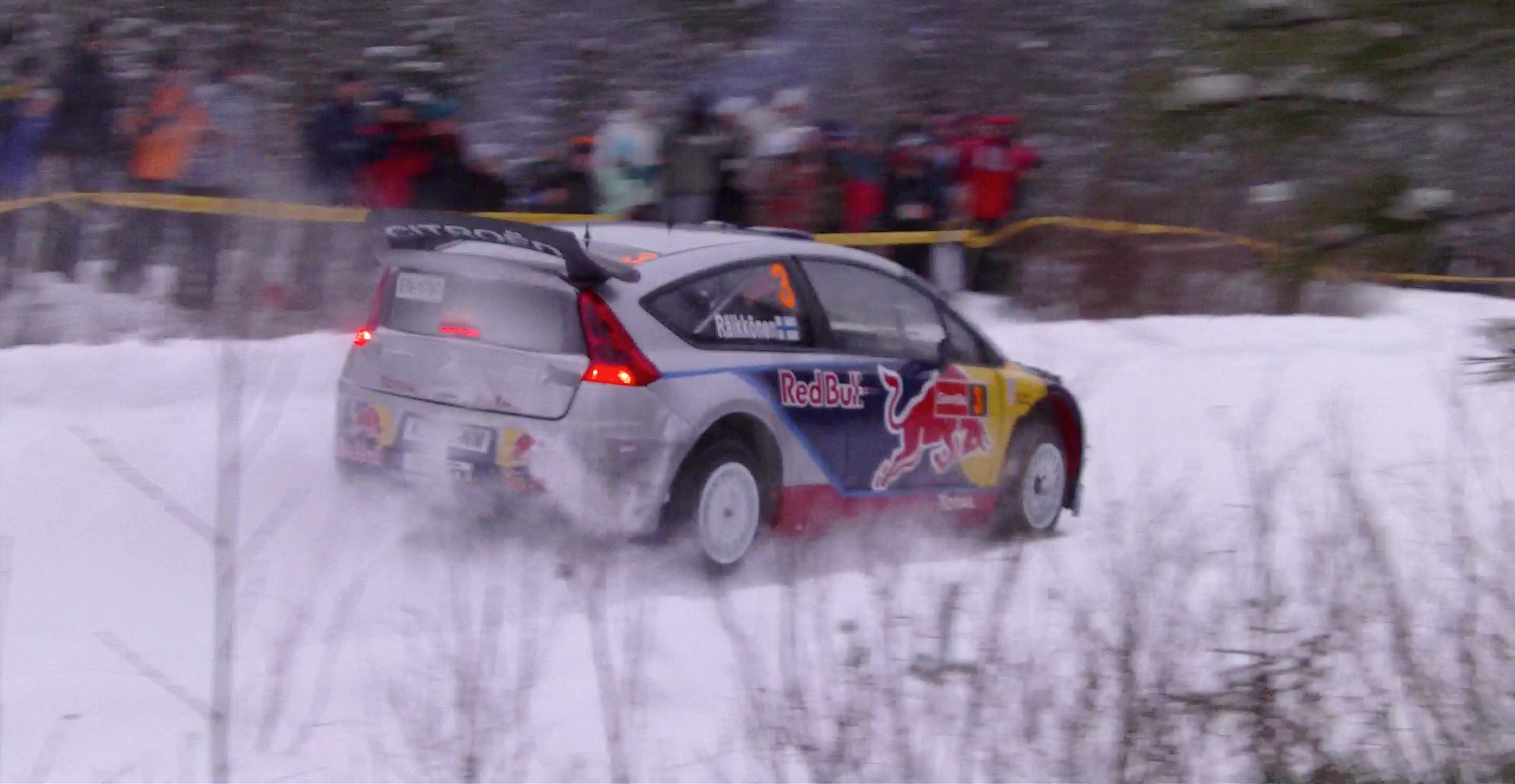
The Arctic Rally became the first World Rally Championship round to be held inside the Arctic Circle.

- Rally Sweden was included on the first draft of the calendar with its traditional February date, but was cancelled before the start of the season due to the COVID-19 pandemic. The Arctic Rally in northern Finland was chosen as a replacement to ensure that a winter rally was included on the calendar. (Note: The Arctic Rally was held twice during the 2021 calendar year. The first running in January was part of the Finnish Rally Championship and the second running in February was the World Championship round.)

In light of the disruption caused by the pandemic in 2020 and in anticipation of further delays, the calendar included an additional six reserve rounds that could be included in the event of rallies being cancelled. These events include rallies in Turkey, Argentina and Latvia. The Ypres Rally had also been included on this reserve list before it replaced Rally GB, so as the Acropolis Rally and Rally Monza.

== Entries ==
Four teams from three manufacturers contested the 2021 World Rally Championship for Manufacturers, enlisting the following crews for each round as detailed. All crews use tyres provided by Pirelli.

World Rally Car entries eligible to score manufacturer points
Manufacturer	Entrant	Car	No.	Driver name	Co-driver name	Rounds
Ford	(United Kingdom) M-Sport Ford WRT	Ford Fiesta WRC	3	(Finland) Teemu Suninen	(Finland) Mikko Markkula	1–2, 5, 7
Ford	(United Kingdom) M-Sport Ford WRT	Ford Fiesta WRC	16	(France) Adrien Fourmaux	(Belgium) Renaud Jamoul	3–4, 6, 8–9
Ford	(United Kingdom) M-Sport Ford WRT	Ford Fiesta WRC	16	(France) Adrien Fourmaux	(France) Alexandre Coria	10–12
Ford	(United Kingdom) M-Sport Ford WRT	Ford Fiesta WRC	44	(United Kingdom) Gus Greensmith	(United Kingdom) Elliott Edmondson	1–2
Ford	(United Kingdom) M-Sport Ford WRT	Ford Fiesta WRC	44	(United Kingdom) Gus Greensmith	(Republic of Ireland) Chris Patterson	3–4, 6–11
Ford	(United Kingdom) M-Sport Ford WRT	Ford Fiesta WRC	44	(United Kingdom) Gus Greensmith	(United Kingdom) Stuart Loudon	5
Ford	(United Kingdom) M-Sport Ford WRT	Ford Fiesta WRC	44	(United Kingdom) Gus Greensmith	(Sweden) Jonas Andersson	12
Hyundai	(South Korea) Hyundai Shell Mobis WRT	Hyundai i20 Coupe WRC	3	(Finland) Teemu Suninen	(Finland) Mikko Markkula	12
Hyundai	(South Korea) Hyundai Shell Mobis WRT	Hyundai i20 Coupe WRC	6	(Spain) Dani Sordo	(Spain) Carlos del Barrio	1
Hyundai	(South Korea) Hyundai Shell Mobis WRT	Hyundai i20 Coupe WRC	6	(Spain) Dani Sordo	(Spain) Borja Rozada	4–6
Hyundai	(South Korea) Hyundai Shell Mobis WRT	Hyundai i20 Coupe WRC	6	(Spain) Dani Sordo	(Spain) Cándido Carrera	9, 11–12
Hyundai	(South Korea) Hyundai Shell Mobis WRT	Hyundai i20 Coupe WRC	8	(Estonia) Ott Tänak	(Estonia) Martin Järveoja	1–11
Hyundai	(South Korea) Hyundai Shell Mobis WRT	Hyundai i20 Coupe WRC	11	(Belgium) Thierry Neuville	(Belgium) Martijn Wydaeghe	All
Hyundai	(South Korea) Hyundai Shell Mobis WRT	Hyundai i20 Coupe WRC	42	(Republic of Ireland) Craig Breen	(Republic of Ireland) Paul Nagle	2–3, 7–8, 10
Hyundai	(France) Hyundai 2C Competition	Hyundai i20 Coupe WRC	2	(Sweden) Oliver Solberg	(United Kingdom) Sebastian Marshall	2
Hyundai	(France) Hyundai 2C Competition	Hyundai i20 Coupe WRC	2	(Sweden) Oliver Solberg	(Republic of Ireland) Aaron Johnston	5–6
Hyundai	(France) Hyundai 2C Competition	Hyundai i20 Coupe WRC	2	(Sweden) Oliver Solberg	(United Kingdom) Craig Drew	11
Hyundai	(France) Hyundai 2C Competition	Hyundai i20 Coupe WRC	2	(Sweden) Oliver Solberg	(United Kingdom) Elliott Edmondson	12
Hyundai	(France) Hyundai 2C Competition	Hyundai i20 Coupe WRC	7	(France) Pierre-Louis Loubet	(France) Vincent Landais	1–3
Hyundai	(France) Hyundai 2C Competition	Hyundai i20 Coupe WRC	7	(France) Pierre-Louis Loubet	(France) Florian Haut-Labourdette	4–9
Hyundai	(France) Hyundai 2C Competition	Hyundai i20 Coupe WRC	14	(Spain) Nil Solans	(Spain) Marc Martí	11
Toyota	(Japan) Toyota Gazoo Racing WRT	Toyota Yaris WRC	1	(France) Sébastien Ogier	(France) Julien Ingrassia	All
Toyota	(Japan) Toyota Gazoo Racing WRT	Toyota Yaris WRC	33	(United Kingdom) Elfyn Evans	(United Kingdom) Scott Martin	All
Toyota	(Japan) Toyota Gazoo Racing WRT	Toyota Yaris WRC	69	(Finland) Kalle Rovanperä	(Finland) Jonne Halttunen	All

The below crews are not entered to score manufacturer points and are entered in World Rally Cars as privateers or under arrangement with the manufacturers.

World Rally Car entries ineligible to score manufacturer points
Manufacturer	Entrant	Car	No.	Driver name	Co-driver name	Rounds
Citroën	(France) Cyrille Féraud	Citroën DS3 WRC	(Note: The crew of Cyrille Féraud and Benoît Manzo competed with multiple numbers throughout the championship.)	(France) Cyrille Féraud	(France) Benoît Manzo	4–5
Ford	(Finland) JanPro	Ford Fiesta WRC	12	(Finland) Janne Tuohino	(Finland) Reeta Hämäläinen	2
Ford	(United Kingdom) M-Sport Ford WRT	Ford Fiesta WRC	9	(Greece) Jourdan Serderidis	(Belgium) Frédéric Miclotte	9
Ford	(United Kingdom) M-Sport Ford WRT	Ford Fiesta WRC	37	(Italy) Lorenzo Bertelli	(Italy) Simone Scattolin	2, 6
Ford	(Croatia) Niko Pulić	Ford Fiesta WRC	54	(Croatia) Niko Pulić	(Croatia) Aleksandra Kovačić	3
Ford	(France) Armando Pereira	Ford Fiesta WRC	(Note: The crew of Armando Pereira and Rémi Tutélaire competed with multiple numbers throughout the championship.)	(France) Armando Pereira	(France) Rémi Tutélaire	3, 11
Toyota	(Finland) RTE-Motorsport	Toyota Yaris WRC	4	(Finland) Esapekka Lappi	(Finland) Janne Ferm	10
Toyota	(Japan) Toyota Gazoo Racing WRT	Toyota Yaris WRC	18	(Japan) Takamoto Katsuta	(United Kingdom) Daniel Barritt	1–7
Toyota	(Japan) Toyota Gazoo Racing WRT	Toyota Yaris WRC	18	(Japan) Takamoto Katsuta	(United Kingdom) Keaton Williams	8–9
Toyota	(Japan) Toyota Gazoo Racing WRT	Toyota Yaris WRC	18	(Japan) Takamoto Katsuta	(Republic of Ireland) Aaron Johnston	10–12

=== In detail ===
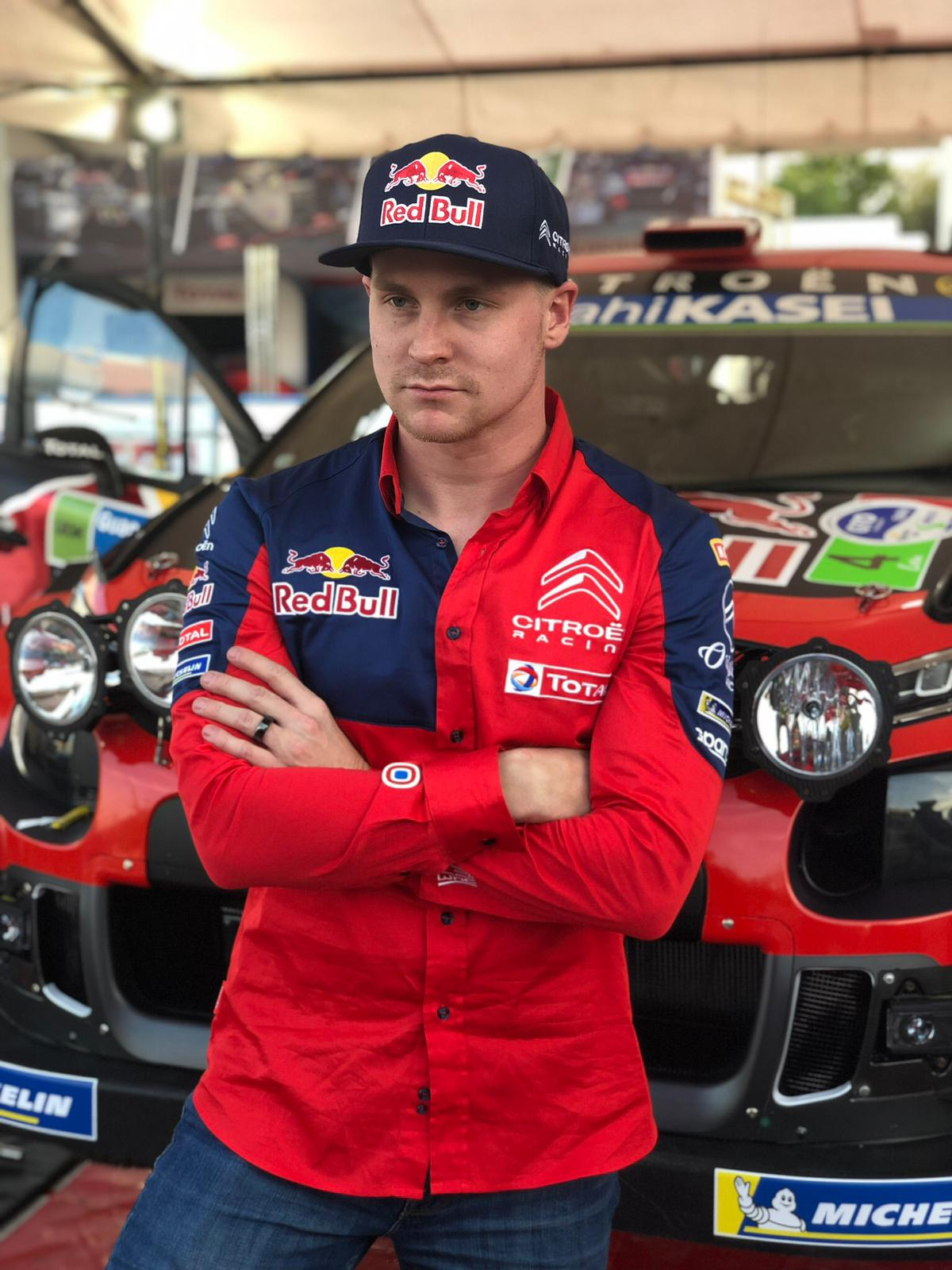
Esapekka Lappi (left) moved to WRC2, allowing Adrien Fourmaux (right) to make his début with M-Sport Ford WRT.

M-Sport Ford WRT only entered two full-time entries in 2021. The first was crewed by Gus Greensmith and Elliott Edmondson, who contested selected rallies for the team in 2019 and 2020. Edmondson was later replaced by Chris Patterson. Stuart Loudon became Greensmith's third co-driver of the season, when Patterson was absent in Sardinia for personal reasons. Greensmith and Patterson parted away after Rally de Catalunya as Patterson decided to retire from competition. Jonas Andersson is confirmed to co-drive with Greensmith in the season finale. The second car was shared by two crews; one made up of WRC2 graduates Adrien Fourmaux and Renaud Jamoul, while the other was led by Teemu Suninen, who was partnered by Mikko Markkula. However, Suninen announced that he quit from the team by mid season. Fourmaux split away with Jamoul during the season. Alexandre Coria became Fourmaux's new co-driver. Esapekka Lappi and Janne Ferm, who drove for M-Sport in 2020, left the team. The two later joined WRC2 team Movisport.

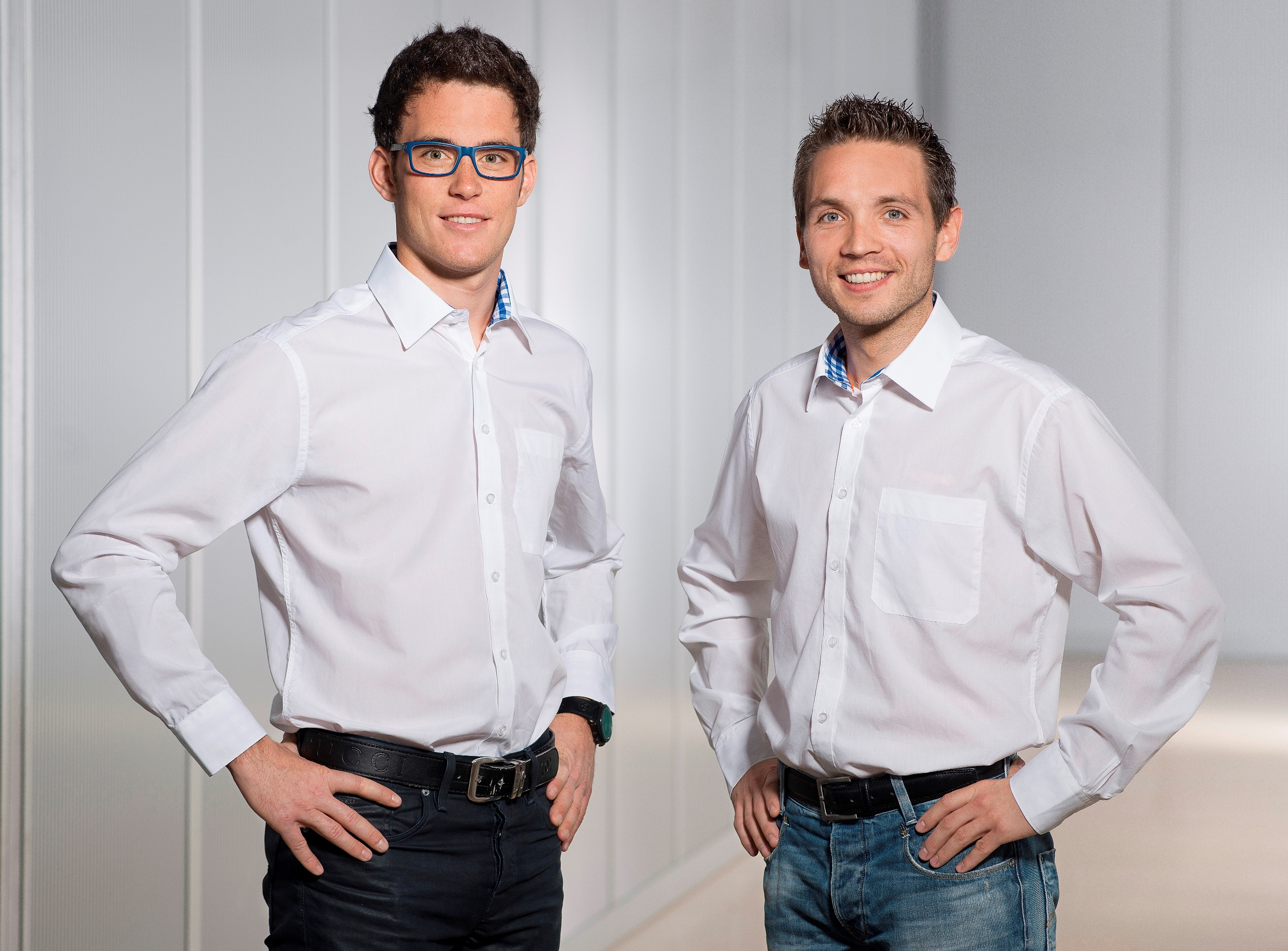
Thierry Neuville (left) parted away with co-driver Nicolas Gilsoul (right) before the season started.

Hyundai retained the line-up of Ott Tänak and Martin Järveoja. Thierry Neuville also retained with the team, but he ended his ten-year partnership with Nicolas Gilsoul. Martijn Wydaeghe became Neuville's new co-driver. The team's third entry was shared between crews led by Dani Sordo and Craig Breen. Sordo formed a new partnership with new co-driver Borja Rozada after the Monte Carlo Rally as Carlos del Barrio moved to co-drive with Fabrizio Zaldívar in the WRC3 category. However, their partnership only lasted three rounds, with Cándido Carrera replaced Rozada. Nine-time World Champion Sébastien Loeb left Hyundai to join Bahrain Raid Xtreme team in the 2021 Dakar Rally and Team X44 in the Extreme E electric rally raid series. Tänak is confirmed to miss the season's finale for family reasons. Suninen, who left M-Sport and competed for Hyundai in the WRC2 category in Spain, replaced the Estonian in Monza.

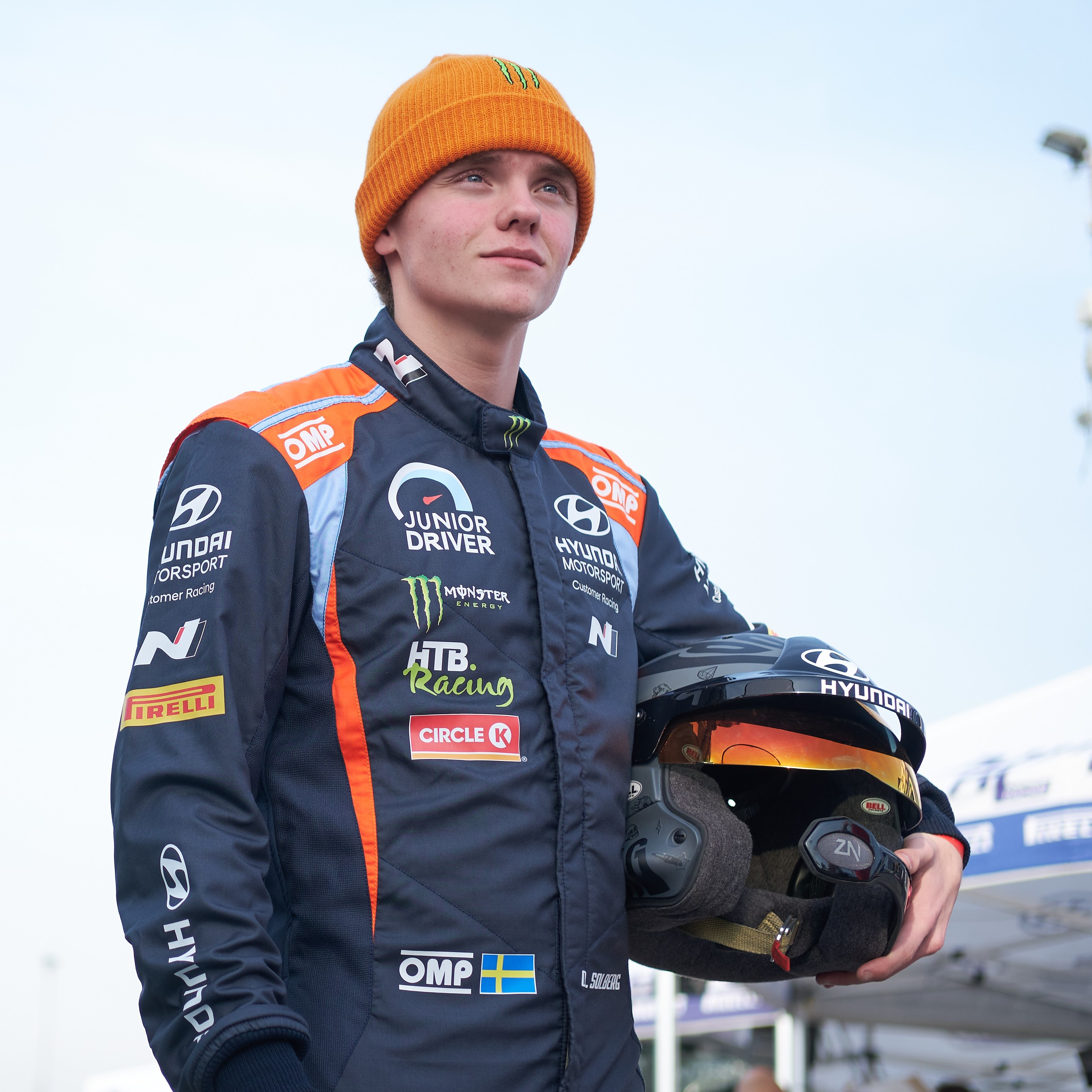
Oliver Solberg made his World Rally Car debut at the 2021 Arctic Rally Finland.

Hyundai's second team, Hyundai 2C Competition, entered an i20 Coupe WRC for Pierre-Louis Loubet and Vincent Landais at every round of the championship. Loubet and Landais had previously contested three events with the team in 2020. Florian Haut-Labourdette later replaced Landais to co-drive with Loubet since Portugal. However, Loubet's full-season programme was brought to an early end as he suffered a hip injury after being involving in a car accident. 2017 Junior WRC Champion Nil Solans made his top-tier debut in Spain as a replacement to the injured Loubet with Marc Martí. Oliver Solberg and Aaron Johnston made their World Rally Car debut at the Arctic Rally. However, Johnston was replaced by Sebastian Marshall at the weekend after testing positive for COVID-19 pandemic. Solberg announced later in the season that the partnership with Johnston ended. American Rally Association champion Craig Drew took over the seat in Catalunya, before Edmondson cooperated with Solberg in Monza.

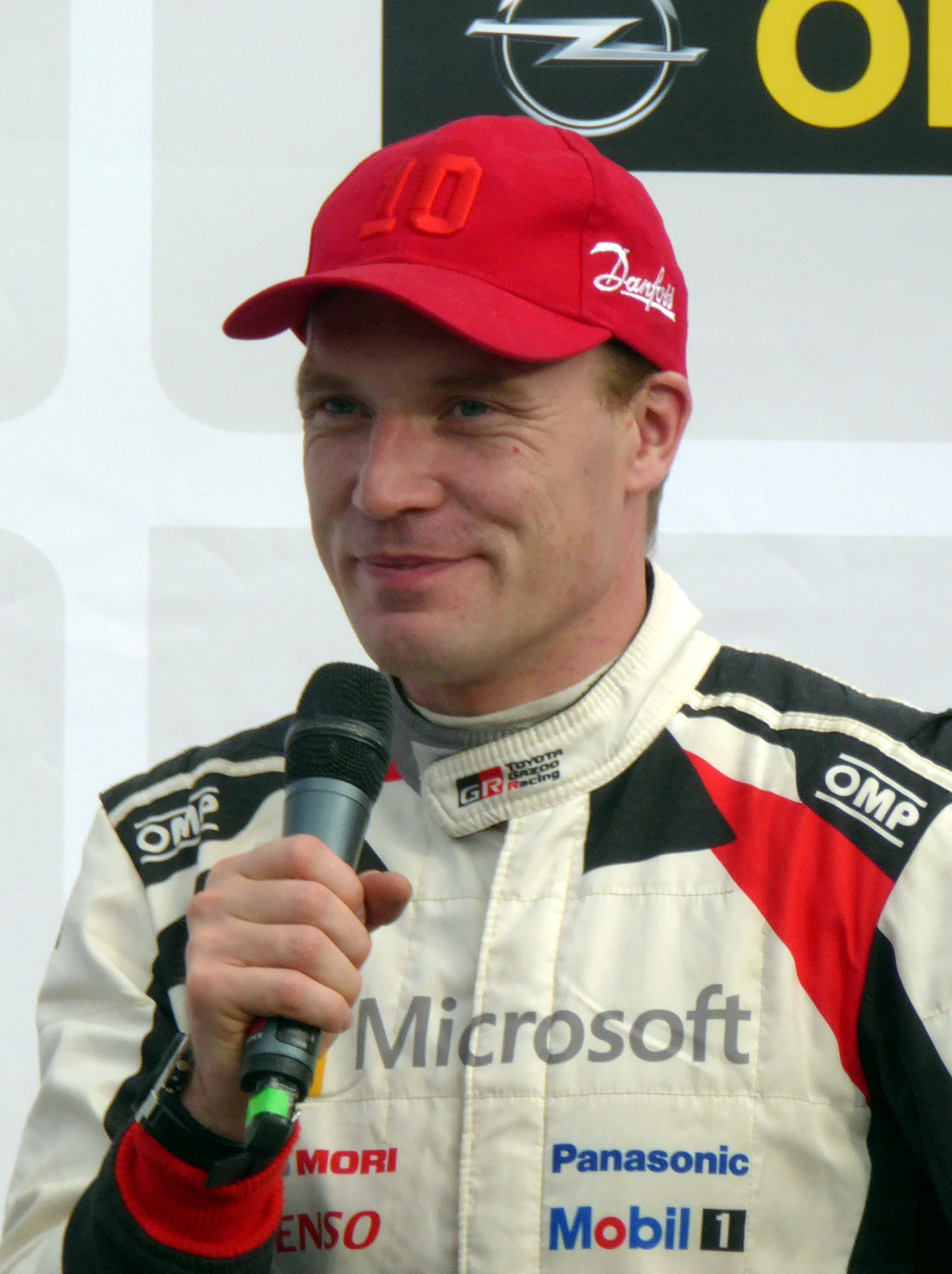
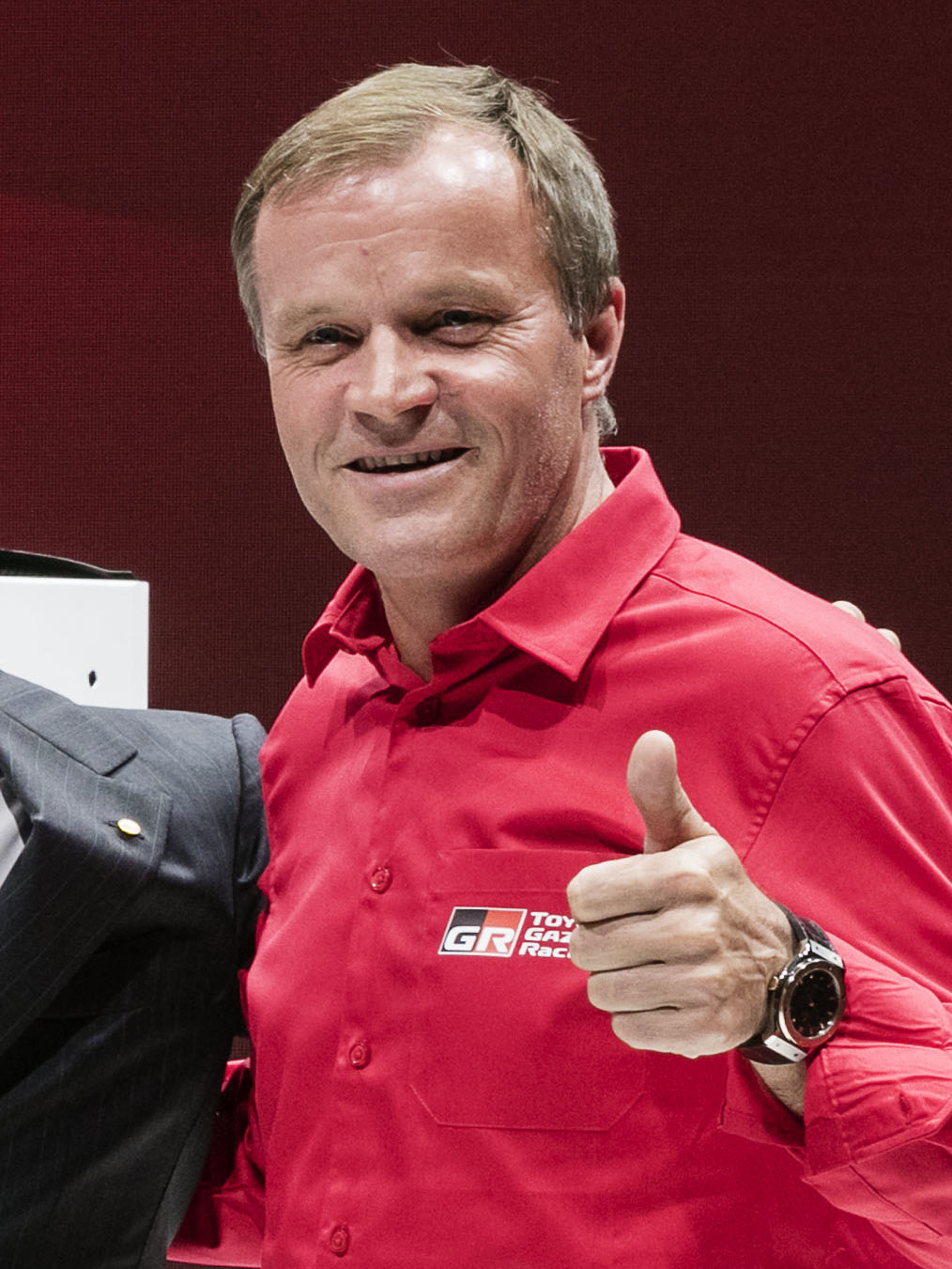
Jari-Matti Latvala (left) replaced Tommi Mäkinen (right) to become the team principal of Toyota Gazoo Racing WRT.

Toyota Gazoo Racing WRT was planned to introduce a new car based on the Toyota GR Yaris, an "homologation special", or road-going version of a car specifically designed for competition and with production limited to the minimum number required to meet homologation requirements. However, the team later announced that it had abandoned development the GR Yaris, citing the effect of the COVID-19 pandemic on the automotive industry and the costs of developing the car when new regulations were due to be introduced in 2022. Tommi Mäkinen stepped down from Toyota's team principal to become the company's motorsport advisor. Former driver Jari-Matti Latvala was named to succeed Mäkinen's role.

Reigning World Drivers' Champion Sébastien Ogier announced that he would retire from full-time competition at the end of the 2020 championship, but his retirement was delayed when he renewed a one-year deal with Toyota. Ogier explained that his decision to stay in the sport was because the shortened 2020 championship was not how he wanted his career to end. The team retained the pairings of Elfyn Evans and Scott Martin and of Kalle Rovanperä and Jonne Halttunen. Takamoto Katsuta and Daniel Barritt also remained with the team to contest a full-time campaign in a fourth car. Barritt missed several events following back and neck injuries suffered in Estonia. Keaton Williams joined Katsuta as substitute co-driver in Greece before a family emergency forced him to withdraw from in the next two events. Johnston became Katsuta's third co-driver following the departure with Solberg, but soon succeeded by Edmondson in the following round.

== Changes ==
=== Technical regulations ===
Pirelli became the official tyre supplier.

Pirelli returned as the championships' sole nominated tyre supplier after having done so between the 2008–10 seasons with the removal of Michelin and Yokohama. Under the terms of the agreement, Pirelli will supply tyres to all entrants of four-wheel drive cars.

=== Sporting regulations ===
The season saw the creation of the World Rally Championship for Teams, a new championship title that existed alongside the World Rally Championships for Drivers, Co-drivers and Manufacturers. A team taking part in the Teams' championship was able to only score points in a rally if a manufacturer competing with the same make of car had been entered into the event. Teams that competed in the Teams' championship were required to take part in a minimum of seven rallies, one of which had to be outside Europe to be eligible for the championship.

As the impact of the COVID-19 pandemic meant that only seven of the thirteen events planned for the 2020 championship took place, the World Motorsport Council passed a resolution declaring that for the drivers', co-drivers' and manufacturers' championship titles to be awarded a minimum of six rallies must be held.

Manufacturers were awarded Power Stage bonus points for the first time. The scoring system remains the same as that used by drivers and co-drivers, with five points awarded for the fastest manufacturer car down to one point for the fifth quickest. Only the two fastest drivers from a single manufacturer are eligible to score.

== Season report ==
=== Opening rounds ===
The 2021 FIA World Rally Championship began in Monaco. The Hyundai crew of Ott Tänak and Martin Järveoja took an early lead, but their lead was wiped out when by a loss of power in hairpins. The Estonian pair's rally was further hampered by two punctures, which meant that they did not have enough rubber on one of their wheels for the car to be considered road legal. Unable to complete the liaison between special stages, Tänak and Järveoja were ruled out for the second consecutive year in Monte-Carlo. The M-Sport crew of Teemu Suninen and Mikko Markkula also retired from the rally when they crashed out on the very first stage of the event. Local heroes Sébastien Ogier and Julien Ingrassia were the favourites for the weekend. Despite a flat tire that lost the lead to their teammates Elfyn Evans and Scott Martin, the reigning world champions set fastest stage time after fastest stage time to regain the top spot and eventually won their eighth Monte Carlo victory, a new record for wins in Monte Carlo. They also became the first crew to win the rally with five different manufacturers. Evans and Martin finished second to complete a Toyota one-two. The Japanese manufacturer's party was further flourished by the dominance at the Power Stage, which saw them build a twenty-two-point lead over the reigning manufacturers' champions Hyundai. The prior year's victor, Thierry Neuville, joined them on the podium with his new co-driver Martijn Wydaeghe, whose first ever podium in the championship.

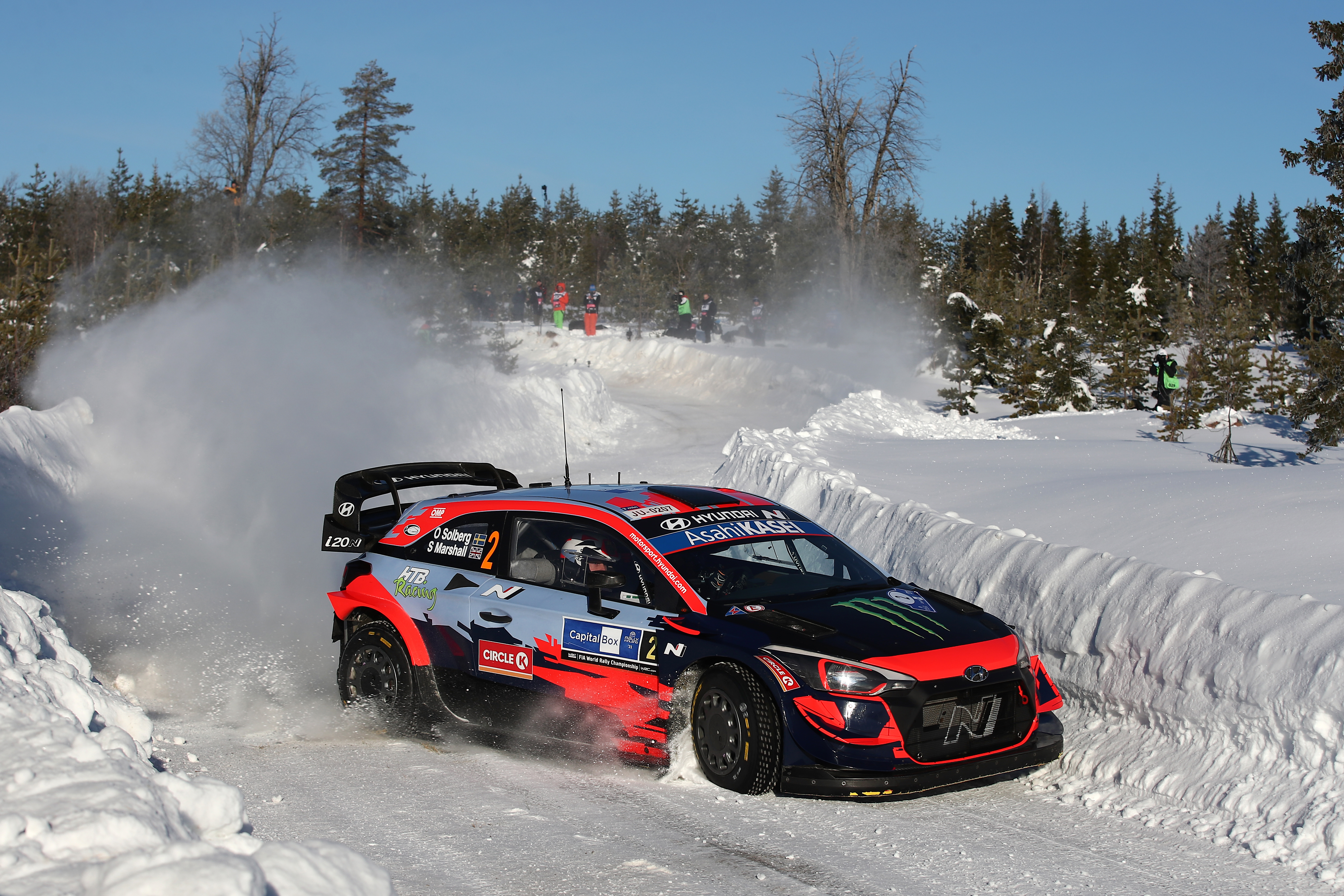
The 2021 Arctic Rally Finland was the first World Rally Championship event held inside the Arctic Circle.

The Arctic Rally Finland saw the championship first visiting inside the Arctic Circle, where local favourites Kalle Rovanperä and Jonne Halttunen were determined to win their first WRC event. However, their ambition was spoiled by Tänak and Järveoja, who benefited from a greater road position. The former world champions demonstrated brilliant pace throughout the weekend, leading the event from start to finish to win their first rally of the season. Unable to match the speed of Tänak and Järveoja, Rovanperä and Halttunen were threatened by Neuville and Wydaeghe going onto the final day. The battle for the runner-up spot would decide the championship leads. Eventually, the Finnish crew managed to edge the Belgian pair by 2.3 seconds as well as winning the Power Stage. This was enough to ensure the twenty-year-old Rovanperä to become the youngest driver to lead the championship in the forty-nine-year history of the WRC. Reigning world champions Ogier and Ingrassia had a weekend to forget. The French crew went into a snowbank 200 meters from the flying finish on Saturday's final test, which took them twenty minutes to free themselves from. They eventually limped home in twentieth place but did collect one consolation point form the Power Stage.

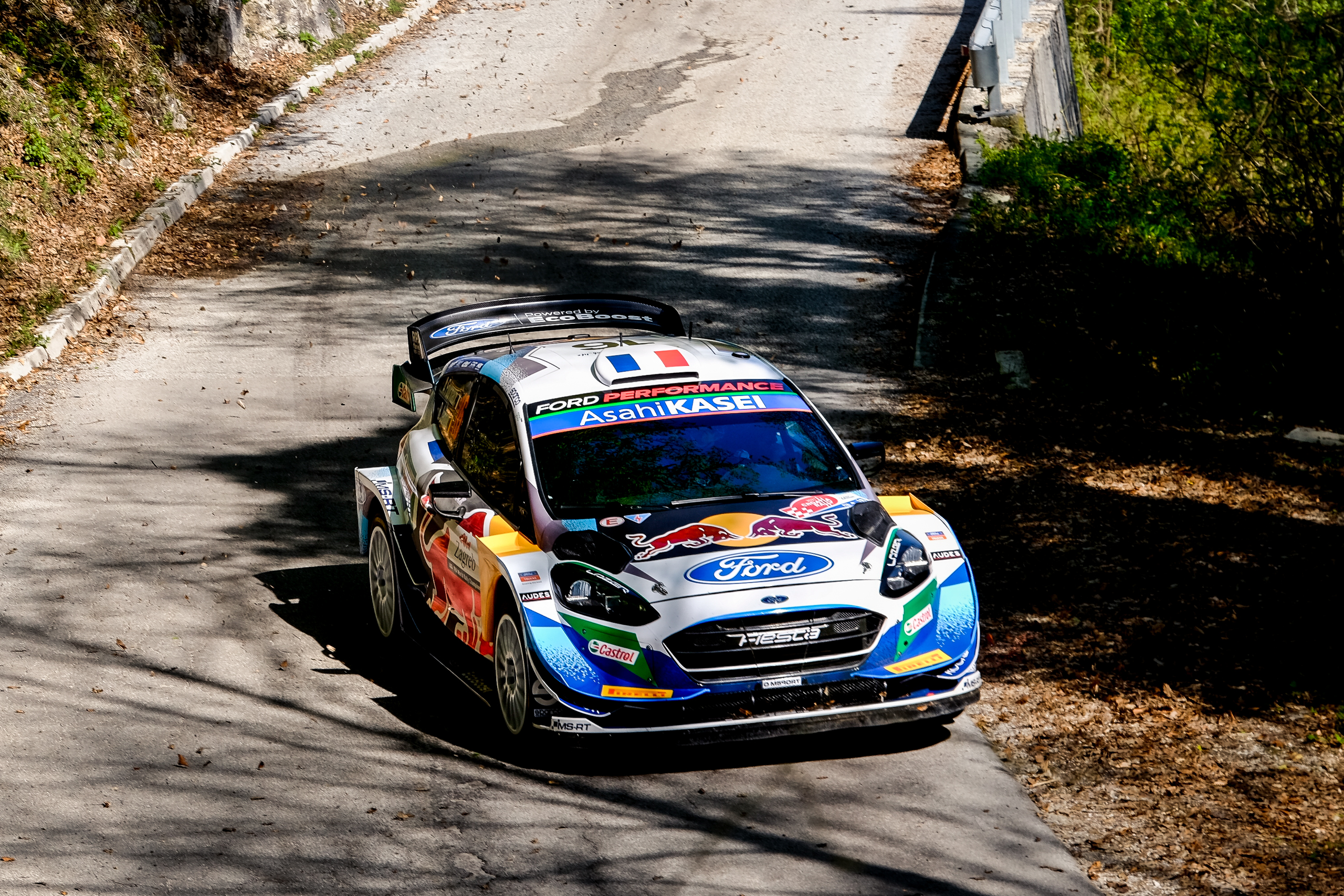
Adrien Fourmaux and Renaud Jamoul made their World Rally Car debut at the 2021 Croatia Rally.

The third round of the season saw the championship held in Croatia, the thirty-fourth country to host a WRC event. Rovanperä and Halttunen entered the rally as championship leaders, but they crashed out on the very first stage of the rally. This gave Neuville and Wydaeghe a clean road, leading the rally onto Saturday. However, an incorrect tyre choice of hard and soft compound mixture plus brake issues on Saturday's morning loop saw them drop down to third. Ogier and Ingrassia became the new rally leaders, but a puncture meant their lead was limited to single-digits. Ogier and Ingrassia snatched the victory and reclaimed the championship leads. 0.6 second was the winning margin, making the rally the third closest win in history after the 2011 Jordan Rally and the 2007 Rally New Zealand. In addition to a full thirty championship points haul, the French pair also reached their 600th stage win milestone. With two 1–2 finishes in three rounds, Toyota held an early lead in the manufacturers' standings, twenty-seven points cleared of Hyundai. Adrien Fourmaux and Renaud Jamoul made their World Rally Car debut with M-Sport Ford this weekend. They posted several top-five stage times to record a remarkable fifth place.

=== Mid-season gravel events ===
Rally Portugal marked the championship returned to the gravel surface in over 200 days. Hyundai dominated the early stage of the rally, holding 1–2–3 after Friday's morning loop. The situation was looking good for the South Korean manufacturer until Neuville and Wydaeghe damaged their rear-right suspension in a tight left-hander following an over-optimistic pacenote in the afternoon. Benefitting from their main rivals' retirements and a relative late road position, Evans and Martin won the rally, their first of the season. Dani Sordo and new co-driver Borja Rozada completed the event second overall to bring their team valuable points after a disaster weekend for Hyundai, while Ogier and Ingrassia rounded out of the podium. Katsuta drove a clean and consistent rally, ensuring the Japanese driver a career-high fourth place.

The Sardinia island rally witnessed another catastrophic weekend for Hyundai. Despite a dominant performance on Friday, the crews of Tänak and Järveoja and of Sordo and Rozada retired from Saturday due to rear suspension damage. Following Hyundai's double disasters, Ogier and Ingrassia took over the rally, with Evans and Martin covered second. With another 1–2 finish, Toyota's lead over Hyundai extended to massive forty-nine points. Neuville and Wydaeghe were the only hope of Hyundai. The Belgian crew was struggling throughout the event and could only managed to finish third.

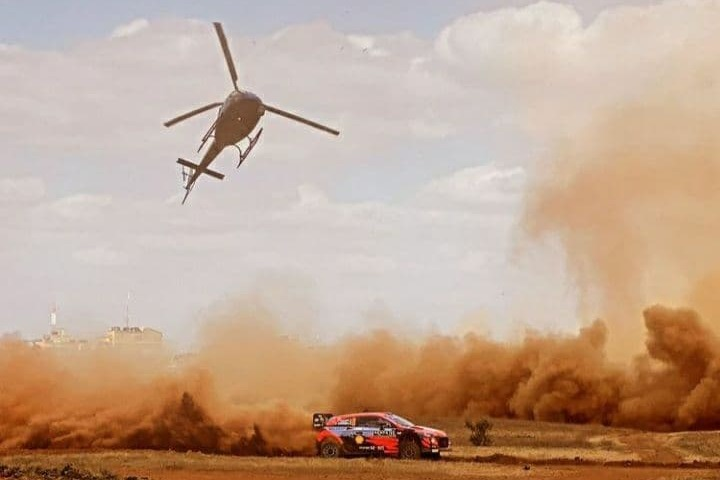
A right-rear suspension failure denied Thierry Neuville and Martijn Wydaeghe's victory in Kenya.

The Safari Rally in Kenya, Africa is renowned for impassable, hard to traverse, open, soft, bumpy, rocky and gravel roads. When the World Rally Championship returned to Kenya after nineteen years, nothing changed. Neuville and Wydaeghe retired from the lead on the final day with a suspension-collapsed issue. This meant for the third consecutive rally, a Hyundai retired from the top spot. Japanese driver Takamoto Katsuta became the new rally leader afterwards, leading a WRC event for the first in his career, but he and his co-driver Barritt were soon overhauled by a charging Ogier and Ingrassia, who were once down in seventh overall. The French crew eventually won the eventful rally to wrap up their fourth victory of the season, and held a commanding lead of thirty-four points in the drivers' and co-drivers' championships heading into the second half of the season. Katsuta secured his WRC podium alongside Barritt, with Tänak and Järveoja rounded out of the podium.

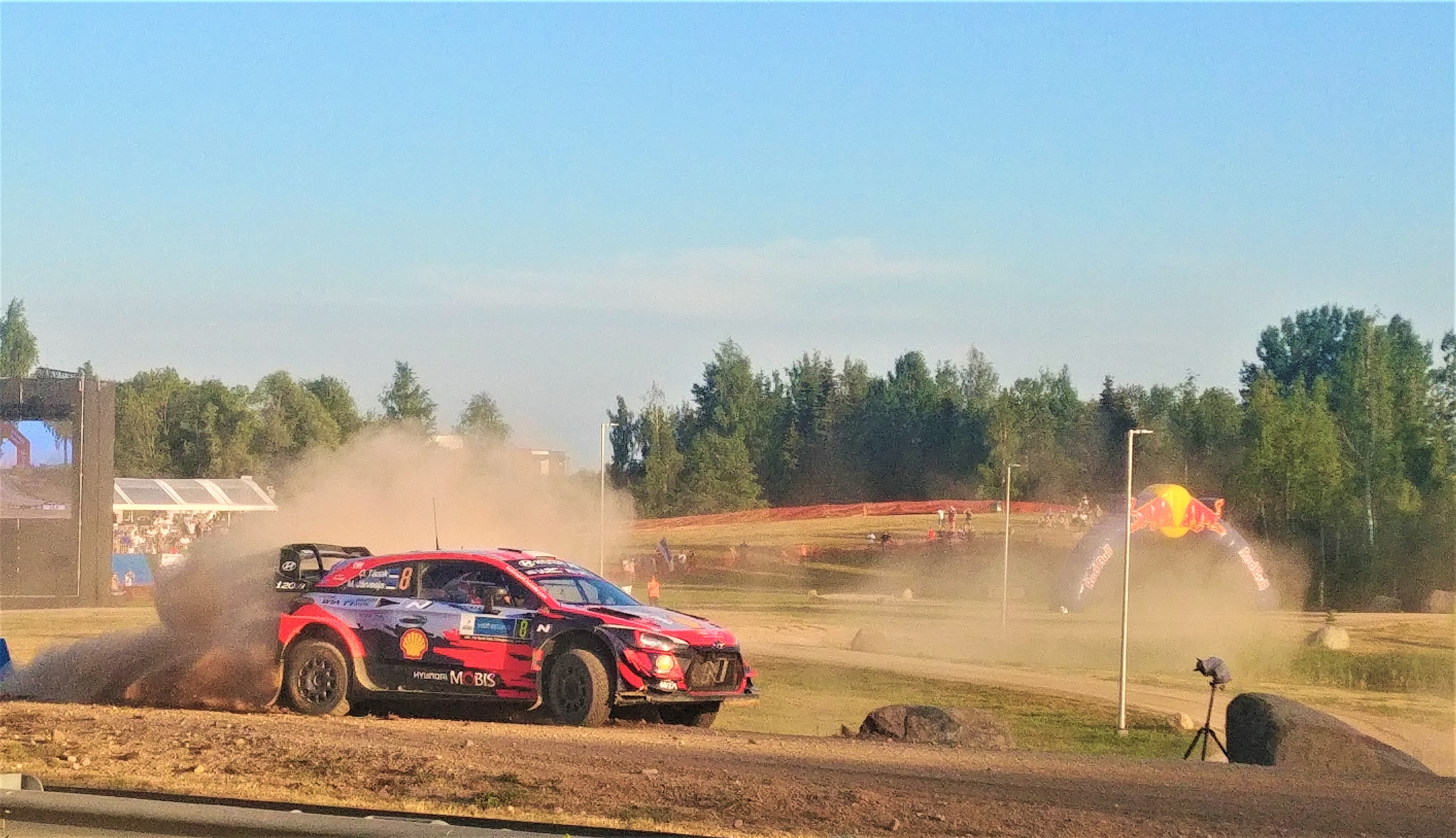
Ott Tänak and Martin Järveoja retired from Friday at their home event.

Halfway through the season, the championship's next stop was Rally Estonia. Ahead of home crowds, local favourites Tänak and Järveoja were keen to repeat their success one year ago. They initially led the rally, but double punctures on Friday's morning loop put them from heroes to zeroes as they run out of spare wheels. Following Tänak and Järveoja's issue, Rovanperä and Halttunen took the lead. Having fended off the pursuit of Craig Breen and Paul Nagle, they claimed their maiden WRC win. At 20 years and 290 days, Rovanperä became the youngest driver to win a WRC event, breaking the previous record of 22 years and 313 days held by Jari-Matti Latvala. Breen and Nagle achieved their first podium of the season by finishing second, with teammates Neuville and Wydaeghe rounded out of the podium with their fifth third place.

=== New and return rallies ===
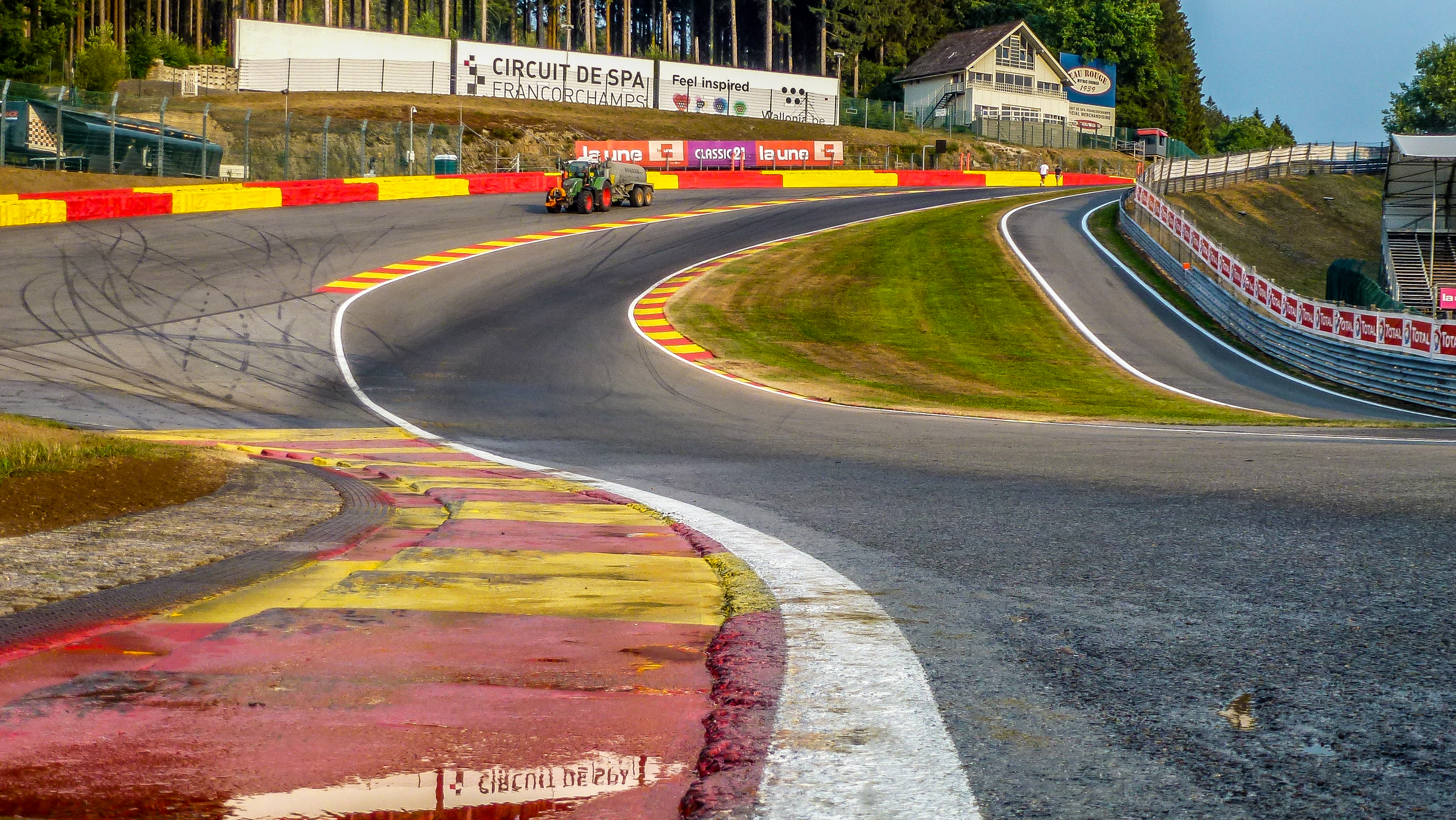
The Circuit de Spa-Francorchamps was featured in Sunday's route of the rally.

The debut of Ypres Rally on the calendar meant Belgium became the thirty-fifth country to host a WRC event. The combination of bridle path and the famous Spa-Francorchamps circuit proved to be relentless for competitors. Local experience was the key to success, which was why local heroes Neuville and Wydaeghe came out in front, bagging an emotional home triumph. This was also the first career victory for Wydaeghe. The only crew who can match their blistering pace were their teammates Breen and Nagle. The Irish crew completed the weekend with another second place.

Greece hosted the championship's return to the Acropolis rally after an eight year absence. Victory was claimed to Rovanperä and Halttunen, who avoided major incidents to secure their second victory of the season. The result also enabled Toyota to extend their championship lead to fifty-seven points. With only three rounds remaining, their position in the title race was highly favourable.

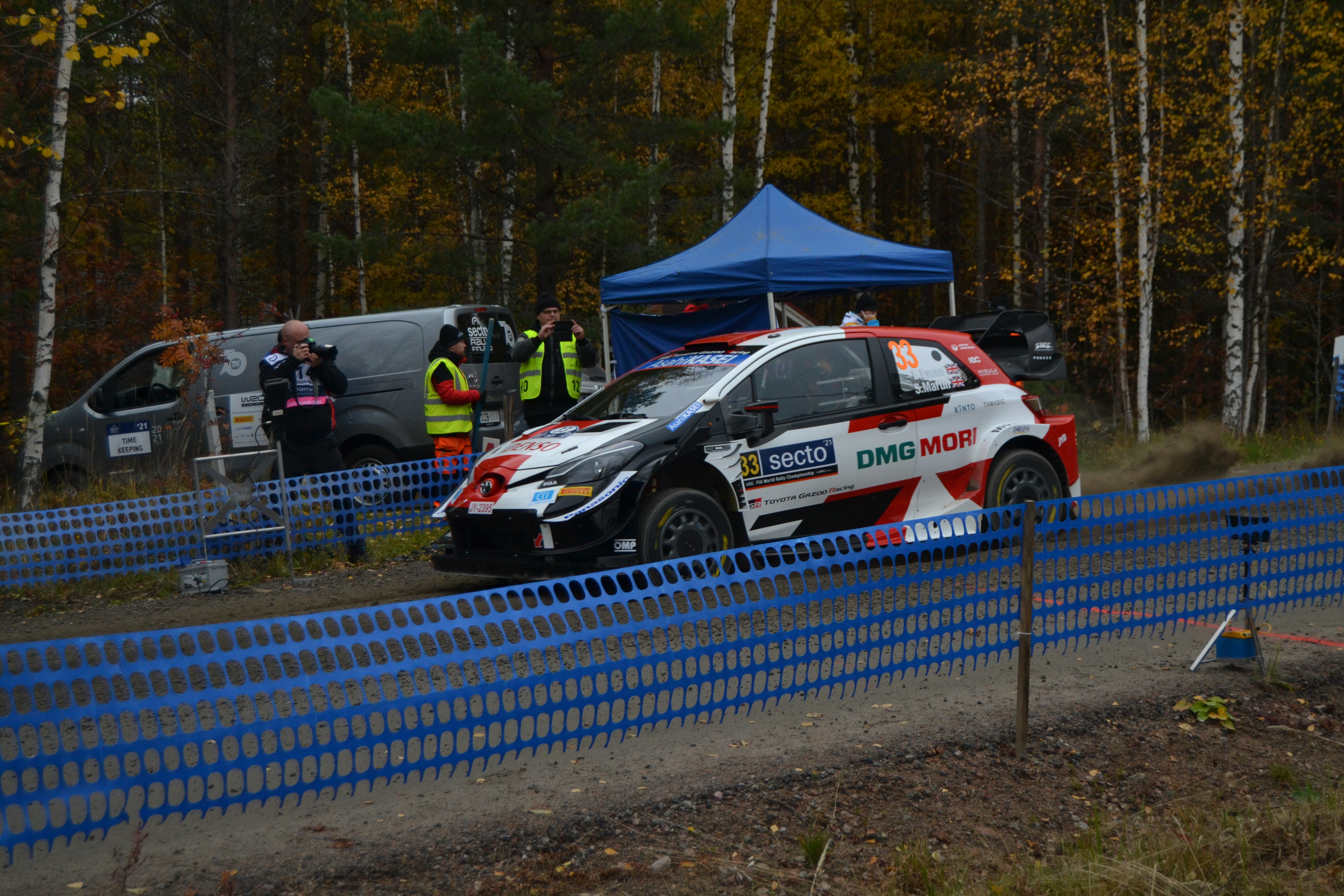
Rally eventual winners Elfyn Evans and Scott Martin during the event.

Rally Finland went ahead on the twenty-first birthday of Rovanperä, who was keen to win his home event. He and Halttunen were running in the front field until they hit with a large pile of gravel on Saturday morning. This caused significant damage to their Yaris, which led to their retirement from the day. Katsuta and new co-driver Aaron Johnston also retired from the day when they ran too deep into a quick left-hander and clouted the bank on the right. Neuville and Wydaeghe's slim title hopes were completely shattered when they stopped halfway through the second test of the Patajoki stage following a compression broke the radiator and caused a water leak. Championship leaders Ogier and Ingrassia were struggled for pace all the weekend, and a one-minute time penalty for not fastening crash helmet strap meant they were in a no men's land. Meanwhile, teammates Evans and Martin were out in front and ultimately won the rally as well as the Power Stage. The result saw Evans and Martin slashed the championship gap by a massive twenty points, trailing Ogier and Ingrassia by twenty-four points after the event.

=== Closing rounds ===
Although Neuville and Wydaeghe lost any chance to clinch the world titles coming into the event, they completely dominated the Spain tarmac, winning a total of ten special stages to grab their second victory of the season after overcoming a late starter motor problem. Evans and Martin kept their title hopes alive as they outscored championship leaders Ogier and Ingrassia. The French crew was looking good to achieve a podium finish till an engine stall at Saturday's final test erased their gap over local heroes Sordo and Cándido Carrera and eventually got overhauled on Sunday morning. Katsuta and Johnston's hope of a good result was gone at the very first stage when their Yaris understeered into the barrier at the opening stage of Friday.

The championship was down to the wire as the season finale was again held at Monza. Holding a healthy lead in the championship standings, championship leaders Ogier and Ingrassia immediately took the lead. Title rivals Evans and Martin passed Ogier and Ingrassia by the end of the first day, but soon lost it back to the French crew in the following morning loop. The top spot changed hands repeatedly. Eventually, Ogier and Ingrassia came out on top, winning their fifth rally of the season to bag their eighth world titles. Sordo and Carrera rounded out of the podium after teammates Neuville and Wydaeghe spun into traffic barrier on Saturday. Manufacturer-wise, Toyota won a total of nine victories out of twelve in comparison to Hyundai's three, which was enough for the Japanese team to clinch the title.

== Results and standings ==
=== Season summary ===
Round	Event	Winning driver	Winning co-driver	Winning entrant	Winning time	Report	Ref.
1	(Monaco) Rallye Automobile Monte Carlo	(France) Sébastien Ogier	(France) Julien Ingrassia	(Japan) Toyota Gazoo Racing WRT	2:56:33.7	Report	
2	Arctic Rally Finland	(Estonia) Ott Tänak	(Estonia) Martin Järveoja	(South Korea) Hyundai Shell Mobis WRT	2:03:49.6	Report	
3	Croatia Rally	(France) Sébastien Ogier	(France) Julien Ingrassia	(Japan) Toyota Gazoo Racing WRT	2:51:22.9	Report	
4	Rally de Portugal	(United Kingdom) Elfyn Evans	(United Kingdom) Scott Martin	(Japan) Toyota Gazoo Racing WRT	3:38:26.2	Report	
5	(Italy) Rally Italia Sardegna	(France) Sébastien Ogier	(France) Julien Ingrassia	(Japan) Toyota Gazoo Racing WRT	3:19:26.4	Report	
6	Safari Rally Kenya	(France) Sébastien Ogier	(France) Julien Ingrassia	(Japan) Toyota Gazoo Racing WRT	3:18:11.3	Report	
7	Rally Estonia	(Finland) Kalle Rovanperä	(Finland) Jonne Halttunen	(Japan) Toyota Gazoo Racing WRT	2:51:29.1	Report	
8	Ypres Rally Belgium	(Belgium) Thierry Neuville	(Belgium) Martijn Wydaeghe	(South Korea) Hyundai Shell Mobis WRT	2:30:24.2	Report	
9	Acropolis Rally Greece	(Finland) Kalle Rovanperä	(Finland) Jonne Halttunen	(Japan) Toyota Gazoo Racing WRT	3:28:24.6	Report	
10	Rally Finland	(United Kingdom) Elfyn Evans	(United Kingdom) Scott Martin	(Japan) Toyota Gazoo Racing WRT	2:19:13.7	Report	
11	(Spain) RACC Rally Catalunya de España	(Belgium) Thierry Neuville	(Belgium) Martijn Wydaeghe	(South Korea) Hyundai Shell Mobis WRT	2:34:11.8	Report	
12	(Italy) Rally Monza	(France) Sébastien Ogier	(France) Julien Ingrassia	(Japan) Toyota Gazoo Racing WRT	2:39:08.6	Report	

=== Scoring system ===
Points were awarded to the top ten classified finishers in each event. In the manufacturers' championship, teams were eligible to nominate three crews to score points, but these points were only awarded to the top two classified finishers representing a manufacturer and driving a 2017-specification World Rally Car. There were also five bonus points awarded to the winners of the Power Stage, four points for second place, three for third, two for fourth and one for fifth. Power Stage points were awarded in the drivers', co-drivers' and manufacturers' championships.

Position	1st	2nd	3rd	4th	5th	6th	7th	8th	9th	10th
Points	25	18	15	12	10	8	6	4	2	1

=== FIA World Rally Championship for Drivers ===
The driver who recorded a top-ten finish was taken into account for the championship regardless of the categories.

Pos.	Driver	MON (Monaco)	ARC (Finland)	CRO (Croatia)	POR (Portugal)	ITA (Italy)	KEN (Kenya)	EST (Estonia)	BEL (Belgium)	GRE (Greece)	FIN (Finland)	ESP (Spain)	MNZ (Italy)	Points
1	(France) Sébastien Ogier	1^{1}	20^{5}	1^{1}	3^{3}	1^{4}	1^{4}	4^{3}	5^{2}	3^{3}	5	4^{4}	1^{5}	230
2	(United Kingdom) Elfyn Evans	2^{3}	5	2^{4}	1^{5}	2	10^{3}	5^{4}	4^{5}	6^{2}	1^{1}	2^{3}	2^{4}	207
3	(Belgium) Thierry Neuville	3^{4}	3^{3}	3^{3}	36^{2}	3^{1}	Ret	3^{2}	1^{3}	8^{4}	Ret	1^{2}	4^{1}	176
4	(Finland) Kalle Rovanperä	4^{2}	2^{1}	Ret	22^{4}	25^{3}	6^{2}	1^{5}	3^{4}	1^{1}	34	5^{5}	9	142
5	(Estonia) Ott Tänak	Ret	1^{4}	4^{5}	21^{1}	24^{2}	3^{1}	31^{1}	6^{1}	2^{5}	2^{2}	Ret		128
6	(Spain) Dani Sordo	5^{5}			2	17^{5}	12^{5}			4		3^{1}	3^{3}	81
7	(Japan) Takamoto Katsuta	6	6	6	4	4	2	Ret	Ret	WD	37^{4}	39	7^{2}	78
8	(Republic of Ireland) Craig Breen		4^{2}	8^{2}				2	2		3^{5}			76
9	(United Kingdom) Gus Greensmith	8	9	7	5	26	4	32	47	5	6	6	8	64
10	(France) Adrien Fourmaux	9	48	5	6	30	5	12	Ret	7	7	16	55	42
11	(Finland) Teemu Suninen	Ret	8	10	8	31	WD	6	Ret	WD	8	11	6	29
12	(Finland) Esapekka Lappi		10		7						4^{3}			22
13	(Sweden) Oliver Solberg	Ret	7		11	WD	Ret	Ret	Ret	Ret	Ret	7	5	22
14	(Norway) Mads Østberg			9	9	6		10		31	9	15		15
15	(France) Yohan Rossel	11		14	14	7			7	DSQ			11	12
16	(Finland) Jari Huttunen		Ret			5		Ret	19		11	Ret	14	10
17	(Norway) Andreas Mikkelsen	7	11	39	WD	Ret	WD	9		9			16	10
18	(France) Pierre-Louis Loubet	16	39	29	Ret	Ret	WD	7	68	Ret		WD		6
19	(Kenya) Onkar Rai						7							6
20	(Spain) Pepe López				Ret	8		15	WD		14	Ret		4
21	(Belgium) Pieter Jan Michiel Cracco		50						8					4
22	(Kenya) Karan Patel						8							4
23	Aleksey Lukyanuk (Note: Aleksey Lukyanuk is Russian, but he competed as a neutral competitor using the designation RAF (Russian Automobile Federation), as the Court of Arbitration for Sport upheld a ban on Russia competing at World Championships. The ban was implemented by the World Anti-Doping Agency in response to state-sponsored doping program of Russian athletes.)							8						4
24	(Spain) Nil Solans											8		4
25	(France) Eric Camilli	10			39							9		3
26	(Spain) Jan Solans				Ret	9						Ret		2
27	(Germany) Fabian Kreim								9			Ret		2
28	(Kenya) Carl Tundo						9							2
29	(Bolivia) Marco Bulacia Wilkinson	15		12	12	10	WD	11		10		Ret	58	2
30	Nikolay Gryazin (Note: Nikolay Gryazin is Russian, but he competed as a neutral competitor using the designation RAF (Russian Automobile Federation), as the Court of Arbitration for Sport upheld a ban on Russia competing at World Championships. The ban was implemented by the World Anti-Doping Agency in response to state-sponsored doping program of Russian athletes.)	12	12	Ret	10	Ret		Ret	59	13	36	10	13	2
31	(Finland) Emil Lindholm		Ret	13	27	Ret		Ret		14	10			1
32	(Italy) Andrea Crugnola					WD							10	1
33	(Belgium) Vincent Verschueren								10					1
Pos.	Driver	MON (Monaco)	ARC (Finland)	CRO (Croatia)	POR (Portugal)	ITA (Italy)	KEN (Kenya)	EST (Estonia)	BEL (Belgium)	GRE (Greece)	FIN (Finland)	ESP (Spain)	MNZ (Italy)	Points

Key
Colour	Result
Gold	Winner
Silver	2nd place
Bronze	3rd place
Green	Points finish
Blue	Non-points finish
Blue	Non-classified finish (NC)
Purple	Did not finish (Ret)
Black	Excluded (EX)
Black	Disqualified (DSQ)
White	Did not start (DNS)
White	Cancelled (C)
Blank	Withdrew entry from the event (WD)

Notes:
^{1 2 3 4 5} – Power Stage position

=== FIA World Rally Championship for Co-Drivers ===
The co-driver who recorded a top-ten finish was taken into account for the championship regardless of the categories.

Pos.	Co-Driver	MON (Monaco)	ARC (Finland)	CRO (Croatia)	POR (Portugal)	ITA (Italy)	KEN (Kenya)	EST (Estonia)	BEL (Belgium)	GRE (Greece)	FIN (Finland)	ESP (Spain)	MNZ (Italy)	Points
1	(France) Julien Ingrassia	1^{1}	20^{5}	1^{1}	3^{3}	1^{4}	1^{4}	4^{3}	5^{2}	3^{3}	5	4^{4}	1^{5}	230
2	(United Kingdom) Scott Martin	2^{3}	5	2^{4}	1^{5}	2	10^{3}	5^{4}	4^{5}	6^{2}	1^{1}	2^{3}	2^{4}	207
3	(Belgium) Martijn Wydaeghe	3^{4}	3^{3}	3^{3}	36^{2}	3^{1}	Ret	3^{2}	1^{3}	8^{4}	Ret	1^{2}	4^{1}	176
4	(Finland) Jonne Halttunen	4^{2}	2^{1}	Ret	22^{4}	25^{3}	6^{2}	1^{5}	3^{4}	1^{1}	34	5^{5}	9	142
5	(Estonia) Martin Järveoja	Ret	1^{4}	4^{5}	21^{1}	24^{2}	3^{1}	31^{1}	6^{1}	2^{5}	2^{2}	Ret		128
6	(Republic of Ireland) Paul Nagle		4^{2}	8^{2}				2	2		3^{5}			76
7	(United Kingdom) Daniel Barritt	6	6	6	4	4	2	Ret						66
8	(Republic of Ireland) Chris Patterson			7	5	WD	4	32	47	5	6	6		54
9	(Spain) Cándido Carrera									4		3^{1}	3^{3}	50
10	(Belgium) Renaud Jamoul	9	48	5	6	30	5	12	Ret	7				36
11	(Finland) Mikko Markkula	Ret	8	10	8	31	WD	6	Ret	WD	8	11	6	29
12	(Finland) Janne Ferm		10		7						4^{3}			22
13	(Spain) Borja Rozada				2	17^{5}	12^{5}					Ret		20
14	(United Kingdom) Elliott Edmondson	8	9							9			5	18
15	(France) Alexandre Coria	22		14	14	7			7	DSQ	7	16	55	18
16	(Norway) Torstein Eriksen			9	9	6		10		31	9	15		15
17	(Republic of Ireland) Aaron Johnston	Ret	WD		11		Ret	Ret	Ret	Ret	37^{4}	39	7^{2}	12
18	(Spain) Carlos del Barrio	5^{5}	33	17	18	11		20		33		23		11
19	(Finland) Mikko Lukka		Ret	34		5		Ret	19		11	Ret	14	10
20	(Norway) Ola Fløene	7	11	39	WD	Ret	WD	9						8
21	(United Kingdom) Sebastian Marshall		7					Ret		Ret	20			6
22	(France) Florian Haut-Labourdette				Ret	Ret	WD	7	68	Ret		WD		6
23	(United Kingdom) Craig Drew										Ret	7		6
24	(United Kingdom) Drew Sturrock						7							6
25	(Sweden) Jonas Andersson		16		DNS	WD							8	4
26	(Spain) Marc Martí				28	Ret						8		4
27	(Belgium) Jasper Vermeulen		50						8					4
28	(Spain) Diego Vallejo				Ret	8								4
29	(Kenya) Tauseef Khan						8							4
30	Yaroslav Fedorov (Note: Yaroslav Fedorov is Russian, but he competed as a neutral competitor using the designation RAF (Russian Automobile Federation), as the Court of Arbitration for Sport upheld a ban on Russia competing at World Championships. The ban was implemented by the World Anti-Doping Agency in response to state-sponsored doping program of Russian athletes.)							8						4
31	(Spain) Rodrigo Sanjuan de Eusebio		47		Ret	9						Ret		2
32	(Kenya) Tim Jessop						9							2
33	(Germany) Frank Christian								9					2
34	(France) Maxime Vilmot											9		2
35	(Argentina) Marcelo Der Ohannesian	15		12	12	10	WD	11		10		Ret	58	2
36	Konstantin Aleksandrov (Note: Konstantin Aleksandrov is Russian, but he competed as a neutral competitor using the designation RAF (Russian Automobile Federation), as the Court of Arbitration for Sport upheld a ban on Russia competing at World Championships. The ban was implemented by the World Anti-Doping Agency in response to state-sponsored doping program of Russian athletes.)	12	12	Ret	10	Ret		Ret	59	13	36	10	13	2
37	(Finland) Reeta Hämäläinen		Ret		27	Ret		Ret		14	10			1
38	(France) François-Xavier Buresi	10										WD		1
39	(Italy) Pietro Ometto					WD							10	1
40	(Belgium) Filip Cuvelier								10					1
Pos.	Co-Driver	MON (Monaco)	ARC (Finland)	CRO (Croatia)	POR (Portugal)	ITA (Italy)	KEN (Kenya)	EST (Estonia)	BEL (Belgium)	GRE (Greece)	FIN (Finland)	ESP (Spain)	MNZ (Italy)	Points

Key
Colour	Result
Gold	Winner
Silver	2nd place
Bronze	3rd place
Green	Points finish
Blue	Non-points finish
Blue	Non-classified finish (NC)
Purple	Did not finish (Ret)
Black	Excluded (EX)
Black	Disqualified (DSQ)
White	Did not start (DNS)
White	Cancelled (C)
Blank	Withdrew entry from the event (WD)

Notes:
^{1 2 3 4 5} – Power Stage position

=== FIA World Rally Championship for Manufacturers ===
Only the best two results of each manufacturer in the respective overall classification and Power Stage at each rally were taken into account for the championship.

Pos.	Manufacturer	MON (Monaco)	ARC (Finland)	CRO (Croatia)	POR (Portugal)	ITA (Italy)	KEN (Kenya)	EST (Estonia)	BEL (Belgium)	GRE (Greece)	FIN (Finland)	ESP (Spain)	MNZ (Italy)	Points
1	(Japan) Toyota Gazoo Racing WRT	1^{1}	2^{1}	1^{1}	1	1^{3}	1	1	3^{4}	1^{1}	1^{1}	2^{3}	1^{5}	520
1	(Japan) Toyota Gazoo Racing WRT	2	4	2^{4}	3^{3}	2	5^{2}	4^{3}	4	3	4^{4}	4^{4}	2^{4}	520
1	(Japan) Toyota Gazoo Racing WRT	NC^{2}	NC^{5}	Ret	NC^{4}	NC^{4}	NC^{3}	NC^{4}	NC^{2}	NC^{2}	NC	NC	NC	520
2	(South Korea) Hyundai Shell Mobis WRT	3^{4}	1	3^{3}	2	3^{1}	2^{1}	2	1^{3}	2^{5}	2^{2}	1^{2}	3^{3}	462
2	(South Korea) Hyundai Shell Mobis WRT	4^{5}	3^{3}	4	6^{1}	4	6^{5}	3^{2}	2	4	3^{3}	3^{1}	4^{1}	462
2	(South Korea) Hyundai Shell Mobis WRT	Ret	NC^{2}	NC^{2}	NC^{2}	NC^{2}	Ret	NC^{1}	NC^{1}	NC^{4}	Ret	Ret	NC	462
3	(United Kingdom) M-Sport Ford WRT	5	6	5	4	5	3	5	5	5	5^{5}	5	6	199
3	(United Kingdom) M-Sport Ford WRT	Ret	7	6	5	6	4	7	Ret	6	6	8	7	199
4	(France) Hyundai 2C Competition	6	5	7	Ret	Ret	Ret	6	6	Ret		6	5	68
4	(France) Hyundai 2C Competition		8			WD	WD					7		68
Pos.	Manufacturer	MON (Monaco)	ARC (Finland)	CRO (Croatia)	POR (Portugal)	ITA (Italy)	KEN (Kenya)	EST (Estonia)	BEL (Belgium)	GRE (Greece)	FIN (Finland)	ESP (Spain)	MNZ (Italy)	Points

Key
Colour	Result
Gold	Winner
Silver	2nd place
Bronze	3rd place
Green	Points finish
Blue	Non-points finish
Blue	Non-classified finish (NC)
Purple	Did not finish (Ret)
Black	Excluded (EX)
Black	Disqualified (DSQ)
White	Did not start (DNS)
White	Cancelled (C)
Blank	Withdrew entry from the event (WD)

Notes:
^{1 2 3 4 5} – Power Stage position
