= 2021 Ypres Rally =

57th edition of Ypres Rally

2021 Ypres Rally Renties Ypres Rally Belgium 2021
Round 8 of 12 in the 2021 World Rally Championship
← Previous event	Next event →
- Host country: Belgium
- Rally base: Ypres, West Flanders
- Dates run: 13 – 15 August 2021
- Start location: Lo-Reninge, West Flanders
- Finish location: Stavelot, Liège
- Stages: 20 (295.78 km; 183.79 miles)
- Stage surface: Tarmac
- Transport distance: 653.71 km (406.20 miles)
- Overall distance: 949.49 km (589.99 miles)

Statistics
- Crews registered: 108
- Crews: 99 at start, 73 at finish

Overall results
- Overall winner: (Belgium) Thierry Neuville (Belgium) Martijn Wydaeghe (South Korea) Hyundai Shell Mobis WRT; 2:30:24.2
- Power Stage winner: (Estonia) Ott Tänak (Estonia) Martin Järveoja (South Korea) Hyundai Shell Mobis WRT; 6:48.3

Support category results
- WRC-2 winner: (Finland) Jari Huttunen (Finland) Mikko Lukka (South Korea) Hyundai Motorsport N 2:51:32.9
- WRC-3 winner: (France) Yohan Rossel (France) Alexandre Coria; 2:42:39.1
- J-WRC winner: (United Kingdom) Jon Armstrong (United Kingdom) Phil Hall; 2:51:55.4

The 2021 Ypres Rally (also known as the Renties Ypres Rally Belgium 2021) was a motor racing event for rally cars that was held over three days between 13 and 15 August 2021. It marked the fifty-seventh running of the Ypres Rally. The event was the eighth round of the 2021 World Rally Championship, World Rally Championship-2 and World Rally Championship-3. It was also the fourth round of the 2021 Junior World Rally Championship. The 2021 event was based in Ypres in West Flanders and was contested over twenty-four special stages totalling 295.78 km (183.79 mi) in competitive distance.

Local heroes Thierry Neuville and Martijn Wydaeghe won their home rally. Their team, Hyundai Shell Mobis WRT, were the manufacturer's winners. Jari Huttunen and Mikko Lukka won the World Rally Championship-2 category, while Yohan Rossel and Alexandre Coria won the World Rally Championship-3 category. The British crew of Jon Armstrong and Phil Hall was the winner in the junior class.

== Background ==
=== Championship standings prior to the event ===
Reigning World Champions Sébastien Ogier and Julien Ingrassia entered the round with a thirty-seven-point lead over Elfyn Evans and Scott Martin. Thierry Neuville and Martijn Wydaeghe were third, a further fifteen points behind. In the World Rally Championship for Manufacturers, Toyota Gazoo Racing WRT held massive a fifty-nine-point lead over defending manufacturers' champions Hyundai Shell Mobis WRT, followed by M-Sport Ford WRT.

In the World Rally Championship-2 standings, Andreas Mikkelsen and Ola Fløene held an eleven-point lead ahead of Mads Østberg and Torstein Eriksen in the drivers' and co-drivers' standings respectively, with Marco Bulacia Wilkinson and Marcelo Der Ohannesian in third. In the teams' championship, Toksport WRT led Movisport by thirty-seven points, with M-Sport Ford WRT in third.

In the World Rally Championship-3 standings, Yohan Rossel led Kajetan Kajetanowicz by sixteen points in the drivers' championship, with Nicolas Ciamin in third. In the co-drivers' championship Maciek Szczepaniak held a twelve-point lead over Alexandre Coria, with Yannick Roche in third.

In the junior championship, Sami Pajari and Marko Salminen led Mārtiņš Sesks and Renars Francis by four points. Jon Armstrong and Phil Hall were third, eleven points further back. In the Nations' standings, Latvia and Finland co-lead United Kingdom by fifteen points.

=== Entry list ===
The following crews entered the rally. The event was open to crews competing in the World Rally Championship, its support categories, the World Rally Championship-2 and World Rally Championship-3, Junior World Rally Championship and privateer entries that were not registered to score points in any championship. Ten entries for the World Rally Championship were received, as were five in the World Rally Championship-2 and nineteen in the World Rally Championship-3. A further six crews entered the Junior World Rally Championship in Ford Fiesta Rally4s.

Rally1 entries competing in the World Rally Championship
No.	Driver	Co-Driver	Entrant	Car	Tyre
1	(France) Sébastien Ogier	(France) Julien Ingrassia	(Japan) Toyota Gazoo Racing WRT	Toyota Yaris WRC	P
7	(France) Pierre-Louis Loubet	(France) Florian Haut-Labourdette	(France) Hyundai 2C Competition	Hyundai i20 Coupe WRC	P
8	(Estonia) Ott Tänak	(Estonia) Martin Järveoja	(South Korea) Hyundai Shell Mobis WRT	Hyundai i20 Coupe WRC	P
11	(Belgium) Thierry Neuville	(Belgium) Martijn Wydaeghe	(South Korea) Hyundai Shell Mobis WRT	Hyundai i20 Coupe WRC	P
16	(France) Adrien Fourmaux	(Belgium) Renaud Jamoul	(United Kingdom) M-Sport Ford WRT	Ford Fiesta WRC	P
18	(Japan) Takamoto Katsuta	(United Kingdom) Keaton Williams	(Japan) Toyota Gazoo Racing WRT	Toyota Yaris WRC	P
33	(United Kingdom) Elfyn Evans	(United Kingdom) Scott Martin	(Japan) Toyota Gazoo Racing WRT	Toyota Yaris WRC	P
42	(Republic of Ireland) Craig Breen	(Republic of Ireland) Paul Nagle	(South Korea) Hyundai Shell Mobis WRT	Hyundai i20 Coupe WRC	P
44	(United Kingdom) Gus Greensmith	(Republic of Ireland) Chris Patterson	(United Kingdom) M-Sport Ford WRT	Ford Fiesta WRC	P
69	(Finland) Kalle Rovanperä	(Finland) Jonne Halttunen	(Japan) Toyota Gazoo Racing WRT	Toyota Yaris WRC	P

Rally2 entries competing in the World Rally Championship-2
No.	Driver	Co-Driver	Entrant	Car	Tyre
20	(Finland) Teemu Suninen	(Finland) Mikko Markkula	(United Kingdom) M-Sport Ford WRT	Ford Fiesta Rally2	P
21	(Finland) Jari Huttunen	(Finland) Mikko Lukka	(South Korea) Hyundai Motorsport N	Hyundai i20 N Rally2	P
22	Nikolay Gryazin (Note: Nikolay Gryazin is Russian, but he competes as a neutral competitor using the designation RAF (Russian Automobile Federation), as the Court of Arbitration for Sport upheld a ban on Russia competing at World Championships. The ban was implemented by the World Anti-Doping Agency in response to state-sponsored doping program of Russian athletes.)	Konstantin Aleksandrov (Note: Konstantin Aleksandrov is Russian, but he competes as a neutral competitor using the designation RAF (Russian Automobile Federation), as the Court of Arbitration for Sport upheld a ban on Russia competing at World Championships. The ban was implemented by the World Anti-Doping Agency in response to state-sponsored doping program of Russian athletes.)	(Italy) Movisport	Volkswagen Polo GTI R5	P
23	(Sweden) Tom Kristensson	(Sweden) David Arhusiander	(United Kingdom) M-Sport Ford WRT	Ford Fiesta Rally2	P
24	(Sweden) Oliver Solberg	(Republic of Ireland) Aaron Johnston	(South Korea) Hyundai Motorsport N	Hyundai i20 N Rally2	P

Rally2 entries competing in the World Rally Championship-3 (Note: Under the Sporting Regulations, each car competing in the World Rally Championship-3 is entered under the driver's name.)
No.	Driver	Co-Driver	Entrant	Car	Tyre
25	(France) Yohan Rossel	(France) Alexandre Coria	(France) Yohan Rossel	Citroën C3 Rally2	P
26	(Spain) Pepe López	(Spain) Borja Odriozola	(Spain) Pepe López	Škoda Fabia Rally2 evo	—N/a
27	(Belgium) Cédric De Cecco	(Belgium) Jérôme Humblet	(Belgium) Cédric De Cecco	Škoda Fabia Rally2 evo	P
28	(Republic of Ireland) Josh McErlean	(Republic of Ireland) James Fulton	(Republic of Ireland) Josh McErlean	Hyundai i20 R5	P
29	(Belgium) Davy Vanneste	(Belgium) Kris D'alleine	(Belgium) Davy Vanneste	Citroën C3 Rally2	P
30	(Belgium) Sébastien Bedoret	(France) François Gilbert	(Belgium) Sébastien Bedoret	Škoda Fabia Rally2 evo	P
31	(Belgium) Pieter Tsjoen	(Belgium) Eddy Chevaillier	(Belgium) Pieter Tsjoen	Volkswagen Polo GTI R5	P
32	(Belgium) Ghislain de Mevius	(Belgium) Johan Jalet	(Belgium) Ghislain de Mevius	Škoda Fabia Rally2 evo	P
34	(Belgium) Adrian Fernémont	(Belgium) Samuel Maillen	(Belgium) Adrian Fernémont	Škoda Fabia Rally2 evo	P
35	(Belgium) Kris Princen	(Belgium) Peter Kaspers	(Belgium) Kris Princen	Citroën C3 Rally2	P
36	(Luxembourg) Grégoire Munster	(Belgium) Louis Louka	(Luxembourg) Grégoire Munster	Hyundai i20 R5	P
37	(Belgium) Vincent Verschueren	(Belgium) Filip Cuvelier	(Belgium) Vincent Verschueren	Volkswagen Polo GTI R5	P
38	(Belgium) Bernd Casier	(Belgium) Pieter Vyncke	(Belgium) Bernd Casier	Ford Fiesta Rally2	P
39	(Belgium) Pieter Jan Michiel Cracco	(Belgium) Jasper Vermeulen	(Belgium) Pieter Jan Michiel Cracco	Škoda Fabia Rally2 evo	P
40	(Belgium) Maxime Potty	(Belgium) Loïc Dumont	(Belgium) Maxime Potty	Ford Fiesta Rally2	P
41	(Belgium) Filip Pyck	(Belgium) Peter Dehouck	(Belgium) Filip Pyck	Škoda Fabia R5	P
43	(Belgium) Harry Bouillon	(Belgium) Gregory Antoine	(Belgium) Harry Bouillon	Škoda Fabia R5	P
45	(Belgium) Kevin Hommes	(Belgium) Marco Hommes	(Belgium) Kevin Hommes	Škoda Fabia R5	P
46	(Belgium) Kurt Dujardyn	(Belgium) Jeannick Breyne	(Belgium) Kurt Dujardyn	Škoda Fabia R5	P

Rally4 entries competing in the Junior World Rally Championship
No.	Driver	Co-Driver	Entrant	Car	Tyre
54	(Finland) Sami Pajari	(Finland) Marko Salminen	(Finland) Porvoon Autopalvelu	Ford Fiesta Rally4	P
55	(Latvia) Mārtiņš Sesks	(Latvia) Renārs Francis	(Latvia) LMT Autosporta Akademija	Ford Fiesta Rally4	P
56	(United Kingdom) Jon Armstrong	(United Kingdom) Phil Hall	(United Kingdom) Jon Armstrong	Ford Fiesta Rally4	P
57	(Finland) Lauri Joona	(Finland) Mikael Korhonen	(Finland) Team Flying Finn	Ford Fiesta Rally4	P
58	(Republic of Ireland) William Creighton	(Republic of Ireland) Liam Regan	(Republic of Ireland) Motorsport Ireland Rally Academy	Ford Fiesta Rally4	P
59	(Estonia) Robert Virves	(Estonia) Aleks Lesk	Autosport Team Estonia	Ford Fiesta Rally4	P

=== Route ===
==== Itinerary ====
All dates and times are CEST (UTC+2).

Leg	Date	Time	No.	Stage name	Distance
—N/a	13 August	08:01	—	Langemark [Shakedown]	9.81 km
1	13 August	13:36	SS1	Reninge — Vleteren 1	15.00 km
1	13 August	14:25	SS2	Westouter — Boeschepe 1	19.60 km
1	13 August	15:15	SS3	Kemmelberg 1	23.62 km
1	13 August	16:09	SS4	Zonnebeke 1	9.45 km
1	13 August	18:15	SS5	Reninge — Vleteren 2	15.00 km
1	13 August	19:04	SS6	Westouter — Boeschepe 2	19.60 km
1	13 August	19:54	SS7	Kemmelberg 2	23.62 km
1	13 August	20:48	SS8	Zonnebeke 2	9.45 km
2	14 August	09:11	SS9	Hollebeke 1	25.86 km
2	14 August	10:08	SS10	Dikkebus 1	12.49 km
2	14 August	11:01	SS11	Watou 1	13.62 km
2	14 August	11:51	SS12	Mesen — Middelhoek 1	7.99 km
2	14 August	14:11	SS13	Hollebeke 2	25.86 km
2	14 August	15:08	SS14	Dikkebus 2	12.49 km
2	14 August	16:01	SS15	Watou 2	13.62 km
2	14 August	16:51	SS16	Mesen — Middelhoek 2	7.99 km
3	15 August	08:30	SS17	Stavelot 1	9.05 km
3	15 August	09:08	SS18	Francorchamps 1	11.21 km
3	15 August	10:40	SS19	Stavelot 2	9.05 km
3	15 August	12:18	SS20	Francorchamps 2 [Power Stage]	11.21 km

== Report ==
=== World Rally Cars ===
==== Classification ====
Position		No.	Driver	Co-driver	Entrant	Car	Time	Difference	Points	
Event	Class	No.	Driver	Co-driver	Entrant	Car	Time	Difference	Event	Stage
1	1	11	Thierry Neuville	Martijn Wydaeghe	Hyundai Shell Mobis WRT	Hyundai i20 Coupe WRC	2:30.24.2	0.0	25	3
2	2	42	Craig Breen	Paul Nagle	Hyundai Shell Mobis WRT	Hyundai i20 Coupe WRC	2:30:54.9	+30.7	18	0
3	3	69	Kalle Rovanperä	Jonne Halttunen	Toyota Gazoo Racing WRT	Toyota Yaris WRC	2:31:07.3	+43.1	15	2
4	4	33	Elfyn Evans	Scott Martin	Toyota Gazoo Racing WRT	Toyota Yaris WRC	2:31:13.8	+49.6	12	1
5	5	1	Sébastien Ogier	Julien Ingrassia	Toyota Gazoo Racing WRT	Toyota Yaris WRC	2:31:20.0	+55.8	10	4
6	6	8	Ott Tänak	Martin Järveoja	Hyundai Shell Mobis WRT	Hyundai i20 Coupe WRC	2:34:10.7	+3:46.5	8	5
47	7	44	Gus Greensmith	Chris Patterson	M-Sport Ford WRT	Ford Fiesta WRC	3:14:22.7	+43:58.5	0	0
68	8	68	Pierre-Louis Loubet	Florian Haut-Labourdette	Hyundai 2C Competition	Hyundai i20 Coupe WRC	3:56:26.7	+1:26.02.5	0	0
Retired SS10		18	Takamoto Katsuta	Keaton Williams	Toyota Gazoo Racing WRT	Toyota Yaris WRC	Crash		0	0
Retired SS3		16	Adrien Fourmaux	Renaud Jamoul	M-Sport Ford WRT	Ford Fiesta WRC	Crash		0	0

==== Special stages ====
Day	Stage	Stage name	Length	Winners	Car	Time	Class leaders
13 August	—	Langemark [Shakedown]	9.81 km	Neuville / Wydaeghe	Hyundai i20 Coupe WRC	4:22.5	—N/a
13 August	SS1	Reninge — Vleteren 1	15.00 km	Tänak / Järveoja	Hyundai i20 Coupe WRC	7:49.1	Tänak / Järveoja
13 August	SS2	Westouter — Boeschepe 1	19.60 km	Breen / Nagle	Hyundai i20 Coupe WRC	10:35.3	Breen / Nagle
13 August	SS3	Kemmelberg 1	23.62 km	Breen / Nagle	Hyundai i20 Coupe WRC	11:39.7	Breen / Nagle
13 August	SS4	Zonnebeke 1	9.45 km	Neuville / Wydaeghe	Hyundai i20 Coupe WRC	4:34.0	Neuville / Wydaeghe
13 August	SS5	Reninge — Vleteren 2	15.00 km	Neuville / Wydaeghe	Hyundai i20 Coupe WRC	7:49.0	Neuville / Wydaeghe
13 August	SS6	Westouter — Boeschepe 2	19.60 km	Neuville / Wydaeghe	Hyundai i20 Coupe WRC	10:27.0	Neuville / Wydaeghe
13 August	SS7	Kemmelberg 2	23.62 km	Neuville / Wydaeghe	Hyundai i20 Coupe WRC	11:28.8	Neuville / Wydaeghe
13 August	SS8	Zonnebeke 2	9.45 km	Stage cancelled			
14 August	SS9	Hollebeke 1	25.86 km	Breen / Nagle	Hyundai i20 Coupe WRC	13:30.7	Neuville / Wydaeghe
14 August	SS10	Dikkebus 1	12.49 km	Breen / Nagle	Hyundai i20 Coupe WRC	6:23.9	Neuville / Wydaeghe
14 August	SS11	Watou 1	13.62 km	Evans / Martin	Toyota Yaris WRC	6:42.0	Neuville / Wydaeghe
14 August	SS12	Mesen — Middelhoek 1	7.99 km	Neuville / Wydaeghe	Hyundai i20 Coupe WRC	4:23.8	Neuville / Wydaeghe
14 August	SS13	Hollebeke 2	25.86 km	Ogier / Ingrassia	Toyota Yaris WRC	13:23.7	Neuville / Wydaeghe
14 August	SS14	Dikkebus 2	12.49 km	Neuville / Wydaeghe	Hyundai i20 Coupe WRC	6:19.1	Neuville / Wydaeghe
14 August	SS15	Watou 2	13.62 km	Ogier / Ingrassia	Toyota Yaris WRC	6:37.1	Neuville / Wydaeghe
14 August	SS16	Mesen — Middelhoek 2	7.99 km	Neuville / Wydaeghe	Hyundai i20 Coupe WRC	4:21.2	Neuville / Wydaeghe
15 August	SS17	Stavelot 1	9.05 km	Rovanperä / Halttunen	Toyota Yaris WRC	5:06.2	Neuville / Wydaeghe
15 August	SS18	Francorchamps 1	11.21 km	Tänak / Järveoja	Hyundai i20 Coupe WRC	6:56.9	Neuville / Wydaeghe
15 August	SS19	Stavelot 2	9.05 km	Tänak / Järveoja	Hyundai i20 Coupe WRC	5:04.0	Neuville / Wydaeghe
15 August	SS20	Francorchamps 2 [Power Stage]	11.21 km	Tänak / Järveoja	Hyundai i20 Coupe WRC	6:48.3	Neuville / Wydaeghe

==== Championship standings ====
Pos.	Drivers' championships			Co-drivers' championships			Manufacturers' championships		
Pos.	Move	Driver	Points	Move	Co-driver	Points	Move	Manufacturer	Points
1		Sébastien Ogier	162		Julien Ingrassia	162		Toyota Gazoo Racing WRT	348
2		Elfyn Evans	124		Scott Martin	124		Hyundai Shell Mobis WRT	307
3		Thierry Neuville	124		Martijn Wydaeghe	124		M-Sport Ford WRT	135
4		Kalle Rovanperä	99		Jonne Halttunen	99		Hyundai 2C Competition	44
5		Ott Tänak	87		Martin Järveoja	87			

=== World Rally Championship-2 ===
==== Classification ====
Position		No.	Driver	Co-driver	Entrant	Car	Time	Difference	Points		
Event	Class	No.	Driver	Co-driver	Entrant	Car	Time	Difference	Class	Stage	Event
19	1	21	Jari Huttunen	Mikko Lukka	Hyundai Motorsport N	Hyundai i20 N Rally2	2:51:32.9	+21:08.7	25	5	0
59	2	24	Nikolay Gryazin	Konstantin Aleksandrov	Movisport	Volkswagen Polo GTI R5	3:35:32.2	+1:05:08.0	18	4	0
Retired SS17		24	Oliver Solberg	Aaron Johnston	Hyundai Motorsport N	Hyundai i20 N Rally2	Electrical		0	0	0
Retired SS13		20	Teemu Suninen	Mikko Markkula	M-Sport Ford WRT	Ford Fiesta Rally2	Engine		0	0	0
Retired SS7		23	Tom Kristensson	David Arhusiander	M-Sport Ford WRT	Ford Fiesta Rally2	Suspension		0	0	0

==== Special stages ====
Day	Stage	Stage name	Length	Winners	Car	Time	Class leaders
13 August	—	Langemark [Shakedown]	9.81 km	Huttunen / Lukka	Hyundai i20 N Rally2	7:49.1	—N/a
13 August	SS1	Reninge — Vleteren 1	15.00 km	Gryazin / Aleksandrov	Volkswagen Polo GTI R5	8:28.2	Gryazin / Aleksandrov
13 August	SS2	Westouter — Boeschepe 1	19.60 km	Suninen / Markkula	Ford Fiesta Rally2	11:26.6	Suninen / Markkula
13 August	SS3	Kemmelberg 1	23.62 km	Suninen / Markkula	Ford Fiesta Rally2	12:36.5	Suninen / Markkula
13 August	SS4	Zonnebeke 1	9.45 km	Suninen / Markkula	Ford Fiesta Rally2	4:57.7	Suninen / Markkula
13 August	SS5	Reninge — Vleteren 2	15.00 km	Suninen / Markkula	Ford Fiesta Rally2	8:24.6	Suninen / Markkula
13 August	SS6	Westouter — Boeschepe 2	19.60 km	Suninen / Markkula	Ford Fiesta Rally2	11:17.1	Suninen / Markkula
13 August	SS7	Kemmelberg 2	23.62 km	Solberg / Johnston	Hyundai i20 N Rally2	12:30.1	Solberg / Johnston
13 August	SS8	Zonnebeke 2	9.45 km	Stage cancelled			
14 August	SS9	Hollebeke 1	25.86 km	Suninen / Markkula	Ford Fiesta Rally2	14:36.1	Solberg / Johnston
14 August	SS10	Dikkebus 1	12.49 km	Suninen / Markkula	Ford Fiesta Rally2	6:56.5	Solberg / Johnston
14 August	SS11	Watou 1	13.62 km	Suninen / Markkula	Ford Fiesta Rally2	7:13.0	Solberg / Johnston
14 August	SS12	Mesen — Middelhoek 1	7.99 km	Suninen / Markkula	Ford Fiesta Rally2	4:45.3	Solberg / Johnston
14 August	SS13	Hollebeke 2	25.86 km	Gryazin / Aleksandrov	Volkswagen Polo GTI R5	14:26.2	Solberg / Johnston
14 August	SS14	Dikkebus 2	12.49 km	Gryazin / Aleksandrov	Volkswagen Polo GTI R5	6:47.4	Solberg / Johnston
14 August	SS15	Watou 2	13.62 km	Gryazin / Aleksandrov	Volkswagen Polo GTI R5	7:07.7	Solberg / Johnston
14 August	SS16	Mesen — Middelhoek 2	7.99 km	Gryazin / Aleksandrov	Volkswagen Polo GTI R5	4:40.1	Solberg / Johnston
15 August	SS17	Stavelot 1	9.05 km	Gryazin / Aleksandrov	Volkswagen Polo GTI R5	5:27.7	Huttunen / Lukka
15 August	SS18	Francorchamps 1	11.21 km	Gryazin / Aleksandrov	Volkswagen Polo GTI R5	7:23.9	Huttunen / Lukka
15 August	SS19	Stavelot 2	9.05 km	Gryazin / Aleksandrov	Volkswagen Polo GTI R5	5:24.9	Huttunen / Lukka
15 August	SS20	Francorchamps 2 [Power Stage]	11.21 km	Huttunen / Lukka	Hyundai i20 N Rally2	8:13.4	Huttunen / Lukka

==== Championship standings ====
Pos.	Drivers' championships			Co-drivers' championships			Teams' championships		
Pos.	Move	Driver	Points	Move	Co-driver	Points	Move	Manufacturer	Points
1		Andreas Mikkelsen	98		Ola Fløene	98		Toksport WRT	168
2		Mads Østberg	87		Torstein Eriksen	87		M-Sport Ford WRT	131
3		Marco Bulacia Wilkinson	82		Marcelo Der Ohannesian	82		Movisport	125
4	4	Jari Huttunen	60	3	Mikko Lukka	60		Hyundai Motorsport N	37
5	1	Esapekka Lappi	59	1	Janne Ferm	59			

=== World Rally Championship-3 ===
==== Classification ====
Position		No.	Driver	Co-driver	Entrant	Car	Time	Difference	Points		
Event	Class	No.	Driver	Co-driver	Entrant	Car	Time	Difference	Class	Stage	Event
7	1	25	Yohan Rossel	Alexandre Coria	Yohan Rossel	Citroën C3 Rally2	2:42:39.1	0.0	25	4	6
8	2	39	Pieter Jan Michiel Cracco	Jasper Vermeulen	Pieter Jan Michiel Cracco	Škoda Fabia Rally2 evo	2:43:30.1	+51.0	18	0	4
10	3	37	Vincent Verschueren	Filip Cuvelier	Vincent Verschueren	Volkswagen Polo GTI R5	2:43:55.3	+1:16.2	15	2	1
11	4	30	Sébastien Bedoret	François Gilbert	Sébastien Bedoret	Škoda Fabia Rally2 evo	2:45:10.7	+2:31.6	12	0	0
12	5	28	Josh McErlean	James Fulton	Josh McErlean	Hyundai i20 R5	2:45:15.8	+2:36.7	10	0	0
13	6	38	Bernd Casier	Pieter Vyncke	Bernd Casier	Ford Fiesta Rally2	2:45:37.5	+2:58.4	8	0	0
14	7	32	Ghislain de Mevius	Johan Jalet	Ghislain de Mevius	Škoda Fabia Rally2 evo	2:46:09.4	+3:30.3	6	3	0
15	8	27	Cédric De Cecco	Jérôme Humblet	Cédric De Cecco	Škoda Fabia Rally2 evo	2:46:31.1	+3:52.0	4	1	0
16	9	36	Grégoire Munster	Louis Louka	Grégoire Munster	Hyundai i20 R5	2:47:24.2	+4:45.1	2	5	0
17	10	35	Kris Princen	Peter Kaspers	Kris Princen	Citroën C3 Rally2	2:47:49.4	+5:10.3	1	0	0
24	11	41	Filip Pyck	Peter Dehouck	Filip Pyck	Škoda Fabia R5	2:47:49.4	+5:10.3	0	0	0
28	12	45	Kevin Hommes	Marco Hommes	Kevin Hommes	Škoda Fabia R5	2:47:49.4	+5:10.3	0	0	0
35	13	46	Kurt Dujardyn	Jeannick Breyne	Kurt Dujardyn	Škoda Fabia R5	2:47:49.4	+5:10.3	0	0	0
50	14	29	Davy Vanneste	Kris D'alleine	Davy Vanneste	Citroën C3 Rally2	2:47:49.4	+5:10.3	0	0	0
57	15	43	Harry Bouillon	Gregory Antoine	Harry Bouillon	Škoda Fabia R5	2:47:49.4	+5:10.3	0	0	0
Retired SS9		31	Pieter Tsjoen	Eddy Chevaillier	Pieter Tsjoen	Volkswagen Polo GTI R5	Crash		0	0	0
Retired SS7		40	Maxime Potty	Loïc Dumont	Maxime Potty	Ford Fiesta Rally2	Engine		0	0	0
Did not start		26	Pepe López	Borja Odriozola	Pepe López	Škoda Fabia Rally2 evo	Withdrawn		0	0	0

==== Special stages ====
Day	Stage	Stage name	Length	Winners	Car	Time	Class leaders
13 August	—	Langemark [Shakedown]	9.81 km	Vanneste / D'alleine	Citroën C3 Rally2	4:46.4	—N/a
13 August	SS1	Reninge — Vleteren 1	15.00 km	Rossel / Coria; Vanneste / D'alleine	Citroën C3 Rally2; Citroën C3 Rally2	8:26.8	Rossel / Coria; Vanneste / D'alleine
13 August	SS2	Westouter — Boeschepe 1	19.60 km	Vanneste / D'alleine	Citroën C3 Rally2	11:19.2	Vanneste / D'alleine
13 August	SS3	Kemmelberg 1	23.62 km	Rossel / Coria	Citroën C3 Rally2	12:37.7	Rossel / Coria
13 August	SS4	Zonnebeke 1	9.45 km	Munster / Louka	Hyundai i20 R5	4:57.6	Rossel / Coria
13 August	SS5	Reninge — Vleteren 2	15.00 km	Rossel / Coria	Citroën C3 Rally2	8:28.7	Rossel / Coria
13 August	SS6	Westouter — Boeschepe 2	19.60 km	Munster / Louka	Hyundai i20 R5	11:18.1	Rossel / Coria
13 August	SS7	Kemmelberg 2	23.62 km	Rossel / Coria	Citroën C3 Rally2	12:30.2	Rossel / Coria
13 August	SS8	Zonnebeke 2	9.45 km	Stage cancelled			
14 August	SS9	Hollebeke 1	25.86 km	Bedoret / Gilbert	Škoda Fabia Rally2 evo	14:27.5	Rossel / Coria
14 August	SS10	Dikkebus 1	12.49 km	Bedoret / Gilbert	Škoda Fabia Rally2 evo	6:53.5	Rossel / Coria
14 August	SS11	Watou 1	13.62 km	Bedoret / Gilbert	Škoda Fabia Rally2 evo	7:10.2	Bedoret / Gilbert
14 August	SS12	Mesen — Middelhoek 1	7.99 km	Vanneste / D'alleine; Munster / Louka	Citroën C3 Rally2; Hyundai i20 R5	4:46.1	Bedoret / Gilbert
14 August	SS13	Hollebeke 2	25.86 km	Vanneste / D'alleine	Citroën C3 Rally2	14:31.3	Bedoret / Gilbert
14 August	SS14	Dikkebus 2	12.49 km	Munster / Louka	Hyundai i20 R5	6:50.3	Bedoret / Gilbert
14 August	SS15	Watou 2	13.62 km	Munster / Louka	Hyundai i20 R5	7:06.3	Bedoret / Gilbert
14 August	SS16	Mesen — Middelhoek 2	7.99 km	Munster / Louka	Hyundai i20 R5	4:40.8	Bedoret / Gilbert
15 August	SS17	Stavelot 1	9.05 km	Rossel / Coria	Citroën C3 Rally2	5:25.8	Rossel / Coria
15 August	SS18	Francorchamps 1	11.21 km	de Mevius / Jalet	Škoda Fabia Rally2 evo	7:22.4	Rossel / Coria
15 August	SS19	Stavelot 2	9.05 km	de Mevius / Jalet	Škoda Fabia Rally2 evo	7:14.2	Rossel / Coria
15 August	SS20	Francorchamps 2 [Power Stage]	11.21 km	Munster / Louka	Hyundai i20 R5	7:17.0	Rossel / Coria

==== Championship standings ====
Pos.	Drivers' championships			Co-drivers' championships		
Pos.	Move	Driver	Points	Move	Co-driver	Points
1		Yohan Rossel	127	1	Alexandre Coria	99
2		Kajetan Kajetanowicz	82	1	Maciek Szczepaniak	82
3		Nicolas Ciamin	57		Yannick Roche	57
4		Fabrizio Zaldívar	39		Carlos del Barrio	39
5		Pepe López	36		Silver Simm	32

=== Junior World Rally Championship ===
==== Classification ====
Position		No.	Driver	Co-driver	Entrant	Car	Time	Difference	Points	
Event	Class	No.	Driver	Co-driver	Entrant	Car	Time	Difference	Class	Stage
20	1	56	Jon Armstrong	Phil Hall	Jon Armstrong	Ford Fiesta Rally4	2:51:55.4	0.0	25	7
21	2	54	Sami Pajari	Marko Salminen	Porvoon Autopalvelu	Ford Fiesta Rally4	2:52:56.0	+1:00.6	18	2
22	3	59	Robert Virves	Aleks Lesk	Autosport Team Estonia	Ford Fiesta Rally4	2:53:17.1	+1:21.7	15	0
23	4	57	Lauri Joona	Mikael Korhonen	Team Flying Finn	Ford Fiesta Rally4	2:53:43.2	+1:47.8	12	0
25	5	58	William Creighton	Liam Regan	Motorsport Ireland Rally Academy	Ford Fiesta Rally4	2:55:27.3	+3:31.9	10	7
70	6	55	Mārtiņš Sesks	Renārs Francis	LMT Autosporta Akademija	Ford Fiesta Rally4	4:03:25.1	+1:11:29.7	8	2

==== Special stages ====
Day	Stage	Stage name	Length	Winners	Car	Time	Class leaders
13 August	—	Langemark [Shakedown]	9.81 km	No stage winners		—N/a	—N/a
13 August	SS1	Reninge — Vleteren 1	15.00 km	Armstrong / Hall	Ford Fiesta Rally4	9:01.2	Armstrong / Hall
13 August	SS2	Westouter — Boeschepe 1	19.60 km	Armstrong / Hall	Ford Fiesta Rally4	5:15.7	Armstrong / Hall
13 August	SS3	Kemmelberg 1	23.62 km	Armstrong / Hall	Ford Fiesta Rally4	13:19.6	Armstrong / Hall
13 August	SS4	Zonnebeke 1	9.45 km	Armstrong / Hall	Ford Fiesta Rally4	5:15.7	Armstrong / Hall
13 August	SS5	Reninge — Vleteren 2	15.00 km	Sesks / Francis	Ford Fiesta Rally4	8:57.1	Armstrong / Hall
13 August	SS6	Westouter — Boeschepe 2	19.60 km	Armstrong / Hall	Ford Fiesta Rally4	11:56.7	Armstrong / Hall
13 August	SS7	Kemmelberg 2	23.62 km	Creighton / Regan	Ford Fiesta Rally4	13:18.0	Armstrong / Hall
13 August	SS8	Zonnebeke 2	9.45 km	Stage cancelled			
14 August	SS9	Hollebeke 1	25.86 km	Stage cancelled			
14 August	SS10	Dikkebus 1	12.49 km	Creighton / Regan	Ford Fiesta Rally4	7:21.2	Armstrong / Hall
14 August	SS11	Watou 1	13.62 km	Armstrong / Hall	Ford Fiesta Rally4	7:37.7	Armstrong / Hall
14 August	SS12	Mesen — Middelhoek 1	7.99 km	Creighton / Regan	Ford Fiesta Rally4	5:03.2	Armstrong / Hall
14 August	SS13	Hollebeke 2	25.86 km	Creighton / Regan	Ford Fiesta Rally4	15:28.8	Armstrong / Hall
14 August	SS14	Dikkebus 2	12.49 km	Pajari / Salminen	Ford Fiesta Rally4	7:12.9	Armstrong / Hall
14 August	SS15	Watou 2	13.62 km	Armstrong / Hall	Ford Fiesta Rally4	7:33.9	Armstrong / Hall
14 August	SS16	Mesen — Middelhoek 2	7.99 km	Pajari / Salminen	Ford Fiesta Rally4	5:00.4	Armstrong / Hall
15 August	SS17	Stavelot 1	9.05 km	Creighton / Regan	Ford Fiesta Rally4	5:49.9	Armstrong / Hall
15 August	SS18	Francorchamps 1	11.21 km	Creighton / Regan	Ford Fiesta Rally4	7:52.3	Armstrong / Hall
15 August	SS19	Stavelot 2	9.05 km	Creighton / Regan	Ford Fiesta Rally4	5:47.6	Armstrong / Hall
15 August	SS20	Francorchamps 2	11.21 km	Sesks / Francis	Ford Fiesta Rally4	7:46.2	Armstrong / Hall

==== Championship standings ====
Pos.	Drivers' championships			Co-drivers' championships			Trophy for nations		
Pos.	Move	Driver	Points	Move	Co-driver	Points	Move	Manufacturer	Points
1		Sami Pajari	91		Marko Salminen	91	1	Finland	76
2	1	Jon Armstrong	88	1	Phil Hall	88	1	United Kingdom	68
3	1	Mārtiņš Sesks	77	1	Renars Francis	77	2	Latvia	68
4		Lauri Joona	52	2	Liam Regan	45		Estonia	46
5	1	William Creighton	45	1	Petr Těšínský	34		Ireland	42

== Notes ==
Previous rally: 2021 Rally Estonia	2021 FIA World Rally Championship	Next rally: 2021 Acropolis Rally
Previous rally: 2019 Ypres Rally; 2020 edition cancelled	2021 Ypres Rally	Next rally: 2022 Ypres Rally
