= 2024 Central European Rally =

2nd edition of Central European Rally

2024 Central European Rally Central European Rally 2024
Round 12 of 13 in the 2024 World Rally Championship
← Previous event	Next event →
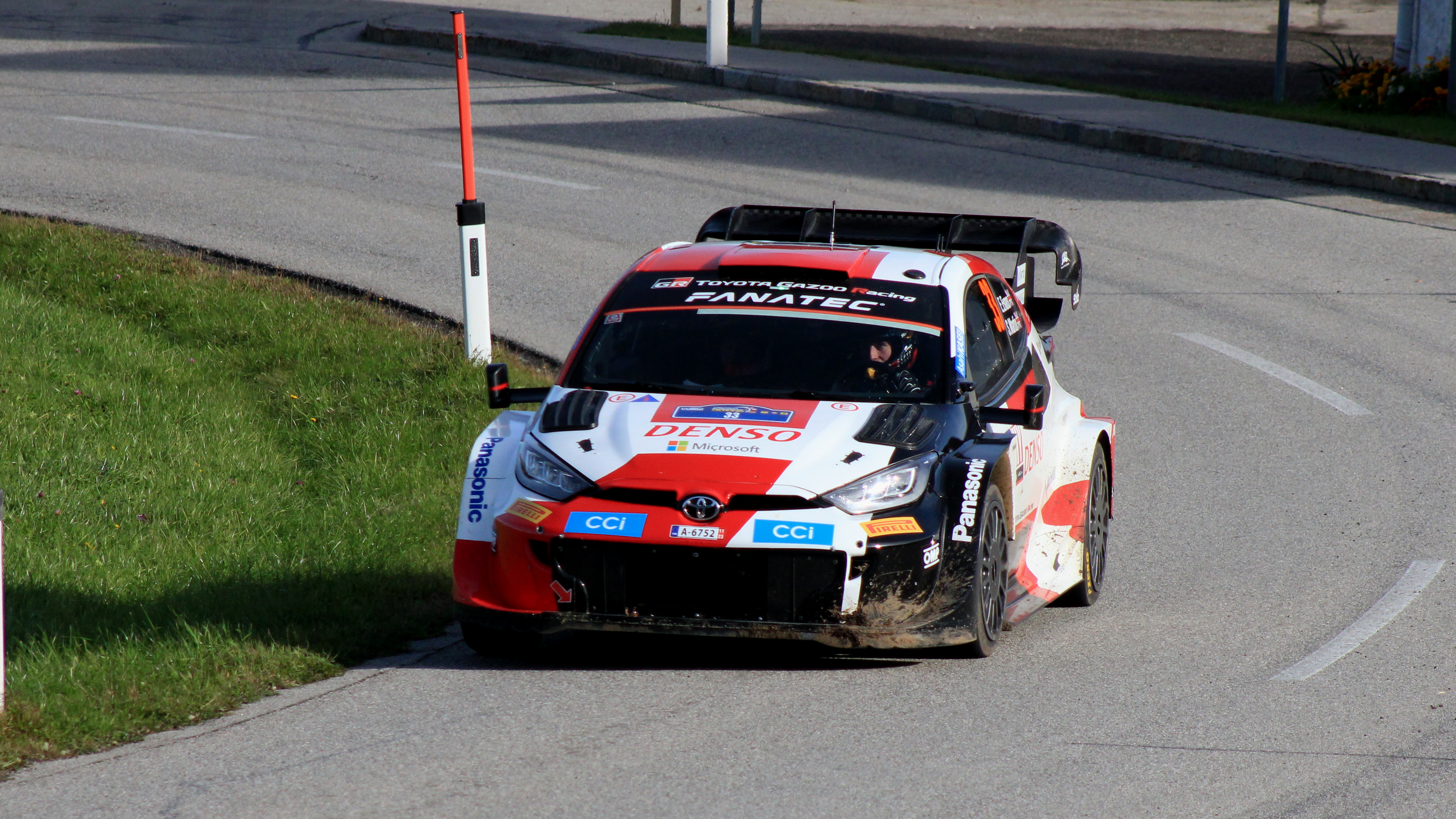
- The Central European Rally features routes across three nations.
- Host country: Austria; Czech Republic; Germany
- Rally base: Passau, Bavaria, Germany
- Dates run: 17 – 20 October 2024
- Start location: Hradčany, Prague, Czech Republic
- Finish location: Passau, Bavaria, Germany
- Stages: 18 (302.51 km; 187.97 miles)
- Stage surface: Tarmac
- Transport distance: 1,283.15 km (797.31 miles)
- Overall distance: 1,585.66 km (985.28 miles)

Statistics
- Crews registered: 44
- Crews: 43 at start, 40 at finish

Overall results
- Overall winner: (Estonia) Ott Tänak (Estonia) Martin Järveoja (South Korea) Hyundai Shell Mobis WRT; 2:37:34.6
- Saturday Overall leader: (Estonia) Ott Tänak (Estonia) Martin Järveoja (South Korea) Hyundai Shell Mobis WRT; 2:10:17.9
- Sunday Accumulated leader: (Japan) Takamoto Katsuta (Republic of Ireland) Aaron Johnston (Japan) Toyota Gazoo Racing WRT; 27:11.1
- Power Stage winner: (Japan) Takamoto Katsuta (Republic of Ireland) Aaron Johnston (Japan) Toyota Gazoo Racing WRT; 7:22.3

Support category results
- WRC-2 winner: (Bulgaria) Nikolay Gryazin; Konstantin Aleksandrov (Belgium) DG Sport Compétition; 2:46:52.2
- WRC-3 winner: (France) Mattéo Chatillon (France) Maxence Cornuau; 2:58:43.2

The 2024 Central European Rally (also known as the Central Europe Rally 2024) was a motor racing event for rally cars held from 17 to 20 October 2024. It marked the second running of the Central European Rally, and is set to be the twelfth round of the 2024 World Rally Championship, World Rally Championship-2 and World Rally Championship-3. The event was based in Passau, Bavaria, Germany, and was contested over eighteen special stages covering a total competitive distance of 302.51 km (187.97 mi).

Thierry Neuville and Martijn Wydaeghe were the defending rally winners, and their team, Hyundai Shell Mobis WRT, were the defending manufacturers' winners. Nicolas Ciamin and Yannick Roche were the defending rally winners in the WRC-2 category. Filip Kohn and Tom Woodburn were the defending rally winners in the WRC-3 category.

Ott Tänak and Martin Järveoja won their second rally of the season, and their team, Hyundai, successfully defended their manufacturers' titles. Nikolay Gryazin and Konstantin Aleksandrov were the winners in the World Rally Championship-2 category. Mattéo Chatillon and Maxence Cornuau were the winners in the World Rally Championship-3 category.

== Background ==
=== Entry list ===
The following crews entered into the rally. The event was opened to crews competing in the World Rally Championship, its support categories, the World Rally Championship-2, World Rally Championship-3 and privateer entries that were not registered to score points in any championship. Ten entered under Rally1 regulations, as were fifteen Rally2 crews in the World Rally Championship-2 and ten Rally3 crew in the World Rally Championship-3.

Rally1 entries competing in the World Rally Championship
No.	Driver	Co-Driver	Entrant	Car	Championship eligibility	Tyre
5	(Finland) Sami Pajari	(Finland) Enni Mälkönen	(Japan) Toyota Gazoo Racing WRT	Toyota GR Yaris Rally1	Driver, Co-driver	P
8	(Estonia) Ott Tänak	(Estonia) Martin Järveoja	(South Korea) Hyundai Shell Mobis WRT	Hyundai i20 N Rally1	Driver, Co-driver, Manufacturer	P
9	(Norway) Andreas Mikkelsen	(Norway) Torstein Eriksen	(South Korea) Hyundai Shell Mobis WRT	Hyundai i20 N Rally1	Driver, Co-driver, Manufacturer	P
11	(Belgium) Thierry Neuville	(Belgium) Martijn Wydaeghe	(South Korea) Hyundai Shell Mobis WRT	Hyundai i20 N Rally1	Driver, Co-driver, Manufacturer	P
13	(Luxembourg) Grégoire Munster	(Belgium) Louis Louka	(United Kingdom) M-Sport Ford WRT	Ford Puma Rally1	Driver, Co-driver, Manufacturer	P
16	(France) Adrien Fourmaux	(France) Alexandre Coria	(United Kingdom) M-Sport Ford WRT	Ford Puma Rally1	Driver, Co-driver, Manufacturer	P
17	(France) Sébastien Ogier	(France) Vincent Landais	(Japan) Toyota Gazoo Racing WRT	Toyota GR Yaris Rally1	Driver, Co-driver, Manufacturer	P
18	(Japan) Takamoto Katsuta	(Republic of Ireland) Aaron Johnston	(Japan) Toyota Gazoo Racing WRT	Toyota GR Yaris Rally1	Driver, Co-driver, Manufacturer	P
19	(Greece) Jourdan Serderidis	(Belgium) Frédéric Miclotte	(United Kingdom) M-Sport Ford WRT	Ford Puma Rally1	Driver, Co-driver	P
33	(United Kingdom) Elfyn Evans	(United Kingdom) Scott Martin	(Japan) Toyota Gazoo Racing WRT	Toyota GR Yaris Rally1	Driver, Co-driver, Manufacturer	P

Rally2 entries competing in the World Rally Championship-2
No.	Driver	Co-Driver	Entrant	Car	Championship eligibility	Tyre
20	(Sweden) Oliver Solberg	(United Kingdom) Elliott Edmondson	(Germany) Toksport WRT 2	Škoda Fabia RS Rally2	Team	P
21	(France) Yohan Rossel	(France) Florian Barral	(Belgium) DG Sport Compétition	Citroën C3 Rally2	Driver, Co-driver, Team	P
22	(Bulgaria) Nikolay Gryazin	Konstantin Aleksandrov (Note: Konstantin Aleksandrov is Russian, but he competes as a neutral competitor using the ANA flag as Russian national emblems were banned by the association due to the Russian invasion of Ukraine.)	(Belgium) DG Sport Compétition	Citroën C3 Rally2	Challenger Driver, Challenger Co-driver, Team	P
23	(Republic of Ireland) Josh McErlean	(Republic of Ireland) James Fulton	(Germany) Toksport WRT 2	Škoda Fabia RS Rally2	Challenger Driver, Challenger Co-driver, Team	P
24	(Poland) Kajetan Kajetanowicz	(Poland) Maciej Szczepaniak	(Poland) Kajetan Kajetanowicz	Škoda Fabia RS Rally2	Challenger Driver, Challenger Co-driver	P
26	(Republic of Ireland) William Creighton	(Republic of Ireland) Liam Regan	(Republic of Ireland) Motorsport Ireland Rally Academy	Ford Fiesta Rally2	Challenger Driver, Challenger Co-driver	P
27	(Germany) Armin Kremer	(Germany) Ella Kremer	(Germany) Armin Kremer	Škoda Fabia RS Rally2	Challenger/Masters Driver, Challenger Co-driver	P
28	(Republic of Ireland) Eamonn Boland	(Republic of Ireland) Michael Joseph Morrissey	(Republic of Ireland) Eamonn Boland	Škoda Fabia RS Rally2	Challenger/Masters Driver, Challenger/Masters Co-driver	P
29	(Poland) Mikołaj Marczyk	(Poland) Szymon Gospodarczyk	(Poland) Mikołaj Marczyk	Škoda Fabia RS Rally2	Challenger Driver, Challenger Co-driver	P
30	(Czech Republic) Filip Mareš	(Czech Republic) Radovan Bucha	(Czech Republic) ACCR Toyota Dolák	Toyota GR Yaris Rally2	Challenger Driver, Challenger Co-driver	P
31	(Germany) Marijan Griebel	(Germany) Tobias Braun	(Germany) Marijan Griebel	Škoda Fabia RS Rally2	Challenger Driver, Challenger Co-driver	P
32	(Belgium) Maxime Potty	(Belgium) Renaud Herman	(Belgium) Maxime Potty	Citroën C3 Rally2	Challenger Driver, Challenger Co-driver	P
34	(Czech Republic) Věroslav Cvrček ml.	(Czech Republic) Petr Těšínský	(Czech Republic) Věroslav Cvrček ml.	Škoda Fabia RS Rally2	Challenger Driver, Challenger Co-driver	P
35	(Czech Republic) Petr Nešetřil	(Czech Republic) Jiří Černoch	(Czech Republic) Petr Nešetřil	Škoda Fabia RS Rally2	Challenger Driver, Challenger Co-driver	P
36	(Spain) Miguel Díaz-Aboitiz	(Spain) Rodrigo Sanjuan de Eusebio	(Spain) Miguel Díaz-Aboitiz	Škoda Fabia RS Rally2	Challenger/Masters Driver, Challenger Co-driver	P
37	(Netherlands) Henk Vossen	(Netherlands) Harmen Scholtalbers	(Netherlands) Henk Vossen	Hyundai i20 N Rally2	Challenger/Masters Driver, Challenger/Masters Co-driver	P

Rally3 entries competing in the World Rally Championship-3
No.	Driver	Co-Driver	Entrant	Car	Tyre
38	(France) Mattéo Chatillon	(France) Maxence Cornuau	(France) Mattéo Chatillon	Renault Clio Rally3	P
39	(Czech Republic) Jan Černý	(Czech Republic) Ondřej Krajča	(Czech Republic) Jan Černý	Ford Fiesta Rally3	P
40	(Czech Republic) Filip Kohn	(United Kingdom) Ross Whittock	(Czech Republic) Filip Kohn	Ford Fiesta Rally3	P
41	(France) Tristan Charpentier	(Finland) Patric Öhman	(France) Tristan Charpentier	Ford Fiesta Rally3	P
43	(Germany) Hermann Gaßner jr.	(Germany) Michael Wenzel	(Germany) ADAC Südbayern	Renault Clio Rally3	P
44	(Poland) Hubert Laskowski	(Poland) Michał Kuśnierz	(Poland) Hubert Laskowski	Ford Fiesta Rally3	P
45	(Croatia) Slaven Šekuljica	(Croatia) Damir Petrović	(Croatia) Slaven Šekuljica	Ford Fiesta Rally3	P
46	(Belgium) Lyssia Baudet	(France) Léa Sam-Caw-Freve	WRC Beyond Rally	Ford Fiesta Rally3	P
47	(Finland) Suvi Jyrkiäinen	(Finland) Antti Linnaketo	WRC Beyond Rally	Ford Fiesta Rally3	P
48	(Germany) Claire Schönborn	(Germany) Jara Hain	WRC Beyond Rally	Ford Fiesta Rally3	P

Other major entries
No.	Driver	Co-Driver	Entrant	Car	Championship eligibility	Tyre
25	(United Kingdom) Gus Greensmith	(Sweden) Jonas Andersson	(Germany) Toksport WRT	Škoda Fabia RS Rally2	—N/a	P
55	(Belgium) Armand Fumal	(France) Jules Escartefigue	(Belgium) Armand Fumal	Alpine A110 Rally RGT	Masters Driver	P

=== Itinerary ===
All dates and times are CEST (UTC+2).

Date	No.	Time span	Stage name	Distance
17 October	—	After 9:01	(Czech Republic) Točná [Shakedown]	2.05 km
17 October		After 14:00	(Czech Republic) Opening ceremony, Hradčany	—N/a
17 October	SS1	After 15:00	(Czech Republic) SSS Velká Chuchle	2.55 km
17 October		17:25 – 18:10	(Czech Republic) Regroup, Klatovy	—N/a
17 October	SS2	After 18:26	(Czech Republic) Klatovy 1	11.78 km
18 October		7:00 – 7:30	(Czech Republic) Remote service, Janovice nad Úhlavou	—N/a
18 October	SS3	After 8:02	(Czech Republic) Klatovy 2	11.78 km
18 October	SS4	After 9:32	(Czech Republic) Strašín 1	26.69 km
18 October	SS5	After 10:42	(Czech Republic) Šumavské Hoštice 1	16.85 km
18 October	SS6	After 13:11	(Czech Republic) Klatovy 3	11.78 km
18 October		14:28 – 14:58	(Czech Republic) Remote service, Janovice nad Úhlavou	—N/a
18 October	SS7	After 16:14	(Czech Republic) Strašín 2	26.69 km
18 October	SS8	After 17:24	(Czech Republic) Šumavské Hoštice 2	16.85 km
18 October		20:04 – 20:49	(Germany) Flexi service A, Karpfham	—N/a
19 October		6:05 – 6:20	(Germany) Service B, Karpfham	—N/a
19 October	SS9	After 7:58	(Germany) Granit und Wald 1	20.05 km
19 October	SS10	After 9:05	(Germany) / (Austria) Beyond Borders 1	24.33 km
19 October	SS11	After 10:34	(Austria) Schärdinger Innviertel 1	17.35 km
19 October		12:10 – 12:50	(Germany) Service C, Karpfham	—N/a
19 October	SS12	After 14:28	(Germany) Granit und Wald 2	20.05 km
19 October	SS13	After 15:35	(Germany) / (Austria) Beyond Borders 2	24.33 km
19 October	SS14	After 17:04	(Austria) Schärdinger Innviertel 2	17.35 km
19 October		18:07 – 18:52	(Germany) Flexi service D, Karpfham	—N/a
20 October		7:05 – 7:20	(Germany) Service E, Karpfham	—N/a
20 October	SS15	After 9:11	(Germany) Knaus Tabbert Am Hochwald 1	12.17 km
20 October		9:43 – 10:08	(Germany) Regroup, Waldkirchen	—N/a
20 October	SS16	After 10:35	(Germany) Passauer Land 1	14.87 km
20 October	SS17	After 11:33	(Germany) Knaus Tabbert Am Hochwald 2	12.17 km
20 October		12:03 – 12:48	(Germany) Regroup, Waldkirchen	—N/a
20 October	SS18	After 13:15	(Germany) Passauer Land 2 [Power Stage]	14.87 km
20 October		After 15:30	(Germany) Podium ceremony, Passau	—N/a

== Report ==
=== WRC Rally1 ===
==== Classification ====
Position		No.	Driver	Co-driver	Entrant	Car	Time	Difference	Points			
Event	Class	No.	Driver	Co-driver	Entrant	Car	Time	Difference	SAT	SUN	WPS	Total
1	1	8	Ott Tänak	Martin Järveoja	Hyundai Shell Mobis WRT	Hyundai i20 N Rally1	2:37:34.6	0.0	18	4	0	22
2	2	33	Elfyn Evans	Scott Martin	Toyota Gazoo Racing WRT	Toyota GR Yaris Rally1	2:37:41.6	+7.0	15	6	3	24
3	3	11	Thierry Neuville	Martijn Wydaeghe	Hyundai Shell Mobis WRT	Hyundai i20 N Rally1	2:38:14.4	+39.8	13	3	2	18
4	4	18	Takamoto Katsuta	Aaron Johnston	Toyota Gazoo Racing WRT	Toyota GR Yaris Rally1	2:38:55.6	+1:21.0	10	7	5	22
5	5	13	Grégoire Munster	Louis Louka	M-Sport Ford WRT	Ford Puma Rally1	2:41:16.5	+3:41.9	8	2	0	10
20	6	19	Jourdan Serderidis	Frédéric Miclotte	M-Sport Ford WRT	Ford Puma Rally1	2:59:45.2	+22:10.6	0	0	0	0
31	7	9	Andreas Mikkelsen	Torstein Eriksen	Hyundai Shell Mobis WRT	Hyundai i20 N Rally1	3:20:54.6	+43:20.0	0	0	4	4
32	8	16	Adrien Fourmaux	Alexandre Coria	M-Sport Ford WRT	Ford Puma Rally1	3:25:19.7	+47:45.1	0	5	1	6
Retired SS17		17	Sébastien Ogier	Vincent Landais	Toyota Gazoo Racing WRT	Toyota GR Yaris Rally1	Crash		0	0	0	0
Retired SS15		5	Sami Pajari	Enni Mälkönen	Toyota Gazoo Racing WRT	Toyota GR Yaris Rally1	Rolled		0	0	0	0

==== Special stages ====
Stage	Winners	Car	Time	Class leaders
SD	Tänak / Järveoja	Hyundai i20 N Rally1	1:07.8	—N/a
SS1	Ogier / Landais	Toyota GR Yaris Rally1	1:49.3	Ogier / Landais
SS2	Neuville / Wydaeghe	Hyundai i20 N Rally1	6:00.2	Ogier / Landais
SS3	Ogier / Landais	Toyota GR Yaris Rally1	5:54.0	Ogier / Landais
SS4	Evans / Martin	Toyota GR Yaris Rally1	13:25.6	Ogier / Landais
SS5	Tänak / Järveoja	Hyundai i20 N Rally1	9:24.5	Neuville / Wydaeghe
SS6	Katsuta / Johnston	Toyota GR Yaris Rally1	5:47.8	Neuville / Wydaeghe
SS7	Neuville / Wydaeghe	Hyundai i20 N Rally1	12:59.0	Neuville / Wydaeghe
SS8	Ogier / Landais	Toyota GR Yaris Rally1	9:12.5	Neuville / Wydaeghe
SS9	Tänak / Järveoja	Hyundai i20 N Rally1	10:52.7	Neuville / Wydaeghe
SS10	Evans / Martin	Toyota GR Yaris Rally1	12:50.2	Neuville / Wydaeghe
SS11	Ogier / Landais	Toyota GR Yaris Rally1	9:23.8	Ogier / Landais
SS12	Tänak / Järveoja	Hyundai i20 N Rally1	10:34.8	Ogier / Landais
SS13	Ogier / Landais	Toyota GR Yaris Rally1	12:33.6	Ogier / Landais
SS14	Ogier / Landais	Toyota GR Yaris Rally1	9:03.5	Ogier / Landais
SS15	Fourmaux / Coria	Ford Puma Rally1	6:09.2	Tänak / Järveoja
SS16	Katsuta / Johnston	Toyota GR Yaris Rally1	7:24.1	Tänak / Järveoja
SS17	Evans / Martin	Toyota GR Yaris Rally1	6:09.4	Tänak / Järveoja
SS18	Katsuta / Johnston	Toyota GR Yaris Rally1	7:22.3	Tänak / Järveoja

==== Championship standings ====
Pos.	Drivers' championships			Co-drivers' championships			Manufacturers' championships		
Pos.	Move	Driver	Points	Move	Co-driver	Points	Move	Manufacturer	Points
1		Thierry Neuville	225		Martijn Wydaeghe	225		Hyundai Shell Mobis WRT	526
2		Ott Tänak	200		Martin Järveoja	200		Toyota Gazoo Racing WRT	511
3	1	Elfyn Evans	185	1	Scott Martin	185		M-Sport Ford WRT	267
4	1	Sébastien Ogier	166	1	Vincent Landais	166			
5		Adrien Fourmaux	146		Alexandre Coria	146			

=== WRC-2 Rally2 ===
==== Classification ====
Position		No.	Driver	Co-driver	Entrant	Car	Time	Difference	Points	
Event	Class	No.	Driver	Co-driver	Entrant	Car	Time	Difference	Class	Event
6	1	22	Nikolay Gryazin	Konstantin Aleksandrov	DG Sport Compétition	Citroën C3 Rally2	2:46:52.2	0.0	25	6
8	2	30	Filip Mareš	Radovan Bucha	ACCR Toyota Dolák	Toyota GR Yaris Rally2	2:49:16.1	+2:23.9	18	3
9	3	29	Mikołaj Marczyk	Szymon Gospodarczyk	Mikołaj Marczyk	Škoda Fabia RS Rally2	2:49:45.2	+2:53.0	15	2
10	4	24	Kajetan Kajetanowicz	Maciej Szczepaniak	Kajetan Kajetanowicz	Škoda Fabia RS Rally2	2:49:54.9	+3:02.7	12	1
11	5	23	Josh McErlean	James Fulton	Toksport WRT 2	Škoda Fabia RS Rally2	2:50:05.2	+3:13.0	10	0
13	6	31	Marijan Griebel	Tobias Braun	Marijan Griebel	Škoda Fabia RS Rally2	2:50:29.6	+3:37.4	8	0
14	7	32	Maxime Potty	Renaud Herman	Maxime Potty	Citroën C3 Rally2	2:53:48.5	+6:56.3	6	0
15	8	27	Armin Kremer	Ella Kremer	Armin Kremer	Škoda Fabia RS Rally2	2:54:11.3	+7:19.1	4	0
16	9	26	William Creighton	Liam Regan	Motorsport Ireland Rally Academy	Ford Fiesta Rally2	2:54:42.1	+7:49.9	2	0
18	10	34	Věroslav Cvrček ml.	Petr Těšínský	Věroslav Cvrček ml.	Škoda Fabia RS Rally2	2:59:10.9	+12:18.7	1	0
26	11	21	Yohan Rossel	Florian Barral	DG Sport Compétition	Citroën C3 Rally2	3:02:37.1	+15:44.9	0	0
27	12	28	Eamonn Boland	Michael Joseph Morrissey	Eamonn Boland	Škoda Fabia RS Rally2	3:12:19.6	+25:27.4	0	0
30	13	35	Petr Nešetřil	Jiří Černoch	Petr Nešetřil	Škoda Fabia RS Rally2	3:20:28.2	+33:36.0	0	0
34	14	37	Henk Vossen	Harmen Scholtalbers	Henk Vossen	Hyundai i20 N Rally2	3:31:55.1	+45:02.9	0	0
38	15	36	Miguel Díaz-Aboitiz	Rodrigo Sanjuan de Eusebio	Miguel Díaz-Aboitiz	Škoda Fabia RS Rally2	3:44:18.1	+57:25.9	0	0

==== Special stages ====
Overall
Stage	Winners	Car	Time	Class leaders
SD	Marczyk / Gospodarczyk	Škoda Fabia RS Rally2	1:11.7	—N/a
SS1	Marczyk / Gospodarczyk	Škoda Fabia RS Rally2	1:53.6	Marczyk / Gospodarczyk
SS2	Gryazin / Aleksandrov	Citroën C3 Rally2	6:21.9	Gryazin / Aleksandrov
SS3	Gryazin / Aleksandrov	Citroën C3 Rally2	6:17.4	Gryazin / Aleksandrov
SS4	Gryazin / Aleksandrov	Citroën C3 Rally2	14:10.2	Gryazin / Aleksandrov
SS5	Stage cancelled			
SS6	Mareš / Bucha	Toyota GR Yaris Rally2	6:11.5	Gryazin / Aleksandrov
SS7	Gryazin / Aleksandrov	Citroën C3 Rally2	13:38.3	Gryazin / Aleksandrov
SS8	Gryazin / Aleksandrov	Citroën C3 Rally2	9:57.0	Gryazin / Aleksandrov
SS9	Gryazin / Aleksandrov	Citroën C3 Rally2	11:36.3	Gryazin / Aleksandrov
SS10	Gryazin / Aleksandrov	Citroën C3 Rally2	13:39.7	Gryazin / Aleksandrov
SS11	Gryazin / Aleksandrov	Citroën C3 Rally2	9:59.0	Gryazin / Aleksandrov
SS12	Rossel / Barral	Citroën C3 Rally2	11:13.5	Gryazin / Aleksandrov
SS13	Gryazin / Aleksandrov	Citroën C3 Rally2	13:15.6	Gryazin / Aleksandrov
SS14	Gryazin / Aleksandrov	Citroën C3 Rally2	9:34.5	Gryazin / Aleksandrov
SS15	Gryazin / Aleksandrov	Citroën C3 Rally2	6:35.8	Gryazin / Aleksandrov
SS16	Gryazin / Aleksandrov	Citroën C3 Rally2	7:56.6	Gryazin / Aleksandrov
SS17	Rossel / Barral	Citroën C3 Rally2	6:33.4	Gryazin / Aleksandrov
SS18	Gryazin / Aleksandrov	Citroën C3 Rally2	7:50.8	Gryazin / Aleksandrov

Challenger
Stage	Winners	Car	Time	Class leaders
SD	Marczyk / Gospodarczyk	Škoda Fabia RS Rally2	1:11.7	—N/a
SS1	Marczyk / Gospodarczyk	Škoda Fabia RS Rally2	1:53.6	Marczyk / Gospodarczyk
SS2	Gryazin / Aleksandrov	Citroën C3 Rally2	6:21.9	Gryazin / Aleksandrov
SS3	Gryazin / Aleksandrov	Citroën C3 Rally2	6:17.4	Gryazin / Aleksandrov
SS4	Gryazin / Aleksandrov	Citroën C3 Rally2	14:10.2	Gryazin / Aleksandrov
SS5	Stage cancelled			
SS6	Mareš / Bucha	Toyota GR Yaris Rally2	6:11.5	Gryazin / Aleksandrov
SS7	Gryazin / Aleksandrov	Citroën C3 Rally2	13:38.3	Gryazin / Aleksandrov
SS8	Gryazin / Aleksandrov	Citroën C3 Rally2	9:57.0	Gryazin / Aleksandrov
SS9	Gryazin / Aleksandrov	Citroën C3 Rally2	11:36.3	Gryazin / Aleksandrov
SS10	Gryazin / Aleksandrov	Citroën C3 Rally2	13:39.7	Gryazin / Aleksandrov
SS11	Gryazin / Aleksandrov	Citroën C3 Rally2	9:59.0	Gryazin / Aleksandrov
SS12	Gryazin / Aleksandrov	Citroën C3 Rally2	11:14.7	Gryazin / Aleksandrov
SS13	Gryazin / Aleksandrov	Citroën C3 Rally2	13:15.6	Gryazin / Aleksandrov
SS14	Gryazin / Aleksandrov	Citroën C3 Rally2	9:34.5	Gryazin / Aleksandrov
SS15	Gryazin / Aleksandrov	Citroën C3 Rally2	6:35.8	Gryazin / Aleksandrov
SS16	Gryazin / Aleksandrov	Citroën C3 Rally2	7:56.6	Gryazin / Aleksandrov
SS17	Gryazin / Aleksandrov	Citroën C3 Rally2	6:36.8	Gryazin / Aleksandrov
SS18	Gryazin / Aleksandrov	Citroën C3 Rally2	7:50.8	Gryazin / Aleksandrov

==== Championship standings ====
- **Bold text** indicates 2024 World Champions.

Pos.	Open Drivers' championships			Open Co-drivers' championships			Teams' championships			Challenger Drivers' championships			Challenger Co-drivers' championships		
Pos.	Move	Driver	Points	Move	Co-driver	Points	Move	Manufacturer	Points	Move	Manufacturer	Points	Move	Driver	Points
1		Oliver Solberg	123		Elliott Edmondson	123		**DG Sport Compétition**	252		Sami Pajari	118		Enni Mälkönen	118
2		Yohan Rossel	111		Enni Mälkönen	108		Toksport WRT	205		Nikolay Gryazin	105		Konstantin Aleksandrov	105
3		Sami Pajari	108		Konstantin Aleksandrov	91	1	Toksport WRT 2	105	1	Kajetan Kajetanowicz	82	1	Maciej Szczepaniak	82
4		Nikolay Gryazin	91	4	Maciej Szczepaniak	59	1	Toyota Gazoo Racing WRT NG	73	1	Lauri Joona	78	1	Janni Hussi	78
5	2	Kajetan Kajetanowicz	59	1	Janni Hussi	58					Jan Solans	68		Rodrigo Sanjuan de Eusebio	68

=== WRC-3 Rally3 ===
==== Classification ====
Position		No.	Driver	Co-driver	Entrant	Car	Time	Difference	Points
Event	Class	No.	Driver	Co-driver	Entrant	Car	Time	Difference	Points
17	1	38	Mattéo Chatillon	Maxence Cornuau	Mattéo Chatillon	Renault Clio Rally3	2:58:43.2	0.0	25
19	2	40	Filip Kohn	Ross Whittock	Filip Kohn	Ford Fiesta Rally3	2:59:39.2	+56.0	18
21	3	43	Hermann Gaßner jr.	Michael Wenzel	ADAC Südbayern	Renault Clio Rally3	2:59:45.6	+1:02.4	15
22	4	44	Hubert Laskowski	Michał Kuśnierz	Hubert Laskowski	Ford Fiesta Rally3	2:59:55.6	+1:12.4	12
24	5	41	Tristan Charpentier	Patric Öhman	Tristan Charpentier	Ford Fiesta Rally3	3:00:51.5	+2:08.3	10
25	6	39	Jan Černý	Ondřej Krajča	Jan Černý	Ford Fiesta Rally3	3:00:54.5	+2:11.3	8
33	7	48	Claire Schönborn	Jara Hain	WRC Beyond Rally	Ford Fiesta Rally3	3:30:11.4	+31:28.2	6
39	8	45	Slaven Šekuljica	Damir Petrović	Slaven Šekuljica	Ford Fiesta Rally3	3:48:38.2	+49:55.0	4
40	9	46	Lyssia Baudet	Léa Sam-Caw-Freve	WRC Beyond Rally	Ford Fiesta Rally3	3:54:57.9	+56:14.7	2
Retired SS17		47	Suvi Jyrkiäinen	Antti Linnaketo	WRC Beyond Rally	Ford Fiesta Rally3	Cooling		0

==== Special stages ====
Stage	Winners	Car	Time	Class leaders
SD	Not run			—N/a
SS1	Gaßner / Wenzel	Renault Clio Rally3	2:00.8	Gaßner / Wenzel
SS2	Černý / Krajča	Ford Fiesta Rally3	6:47.7	Černý / Krajča
SS3	Černý / Krajča	Ford Fiesta Rally3	6:38.7	Černý / Krajča
SS4	Kohn / Whittock	Ford Fiesta Rally3	15:22.9	Chatillon / Cornuau
SS5	Stage cancelled			
SS6	Chatillon / Cornuau	Renault Clio Rally3	6:33.5	Chatillon / Cornuau
SS7	Černý / Krajča	Ford Fiesta Rally3	14:35.4	Chatillon / Cornuau
SS8	Černý / Krajča	Ford Fiesta Rally3	10:51.9	Chatillon / Cornuau
SS9	Černý / Krajča	Ford Fiesta Rally3	12:30.7	Chatillon / Cornuau
SS10	Černý / Krajča	Ford Fiesta Rally3	14:38.2	Chatillon / Cornuau
SS11	Černý / Krajča	Ford Fiesta Rally3	10:23.9	Chatillon / Cornuau
SS12	Chatillon / Cornuau	Renault Clio Rally3	11:47.3	Chatillon / Cornuau
SS13	Černý / Krajča	Ford Fiesta Rally3	14:04.8	Chatillon / Cornuau
SS14	Laskowski / Kuśnierz	Ford Fiesta Rally3	10:17.5	Chatillon / Cornuau
SS15	Kohn / Whittock	Ford Fiesta Rally3	7:01.8	Chatillon / Cornuau
SS16	Černý / Krajča	Ford Fiesta Rally3	8:26.3	Chatillon / Cornuau
SS17	Kohn / Whittock	Ford Fiesta Rally3	6:58.7	Chatillon / Cornuau
SS18	Černý / Krajča	Ford Fiesta Rally3	8:20.5	Chatillon / Cornuau

==== Championship standings ====
- **Bold text** indicates 2024 World Champions.

Pos.	Drivers' championships			Co-drivers' championships		
Pos.	Move	Driver	Points	Move	Co-driver	Points
1		**Diego Dominguez Jr.**	100		**Rogelio Peñate**	100
2	2	Mattéo Chatillon	73	2	Maxence Cornuau	73
3	1	Romet Jürgenson	61	1	Siim Oja	61
4	1	Jan Černý	55	1	Ondřej Krajča	55
5	2	Norbert Maior	49	2	Francesca Maria Maior	49

== Notes ==
Previous rally: 2024 Rally Chile	2024 FIA World Rally Championship	Next rally: 2024 Rally Japan
Previous rally: 2023 Central European Rally	2024 Central European Rally	Next rally: 2025 Central European Rally
