= 2024 Rally Japan =

9th edition of Rally Japan

2024 Rally Japan FORUM8 Rally Japan 2024
Round 13 of 13 in the 2024 World Rally Championship
← Previous event
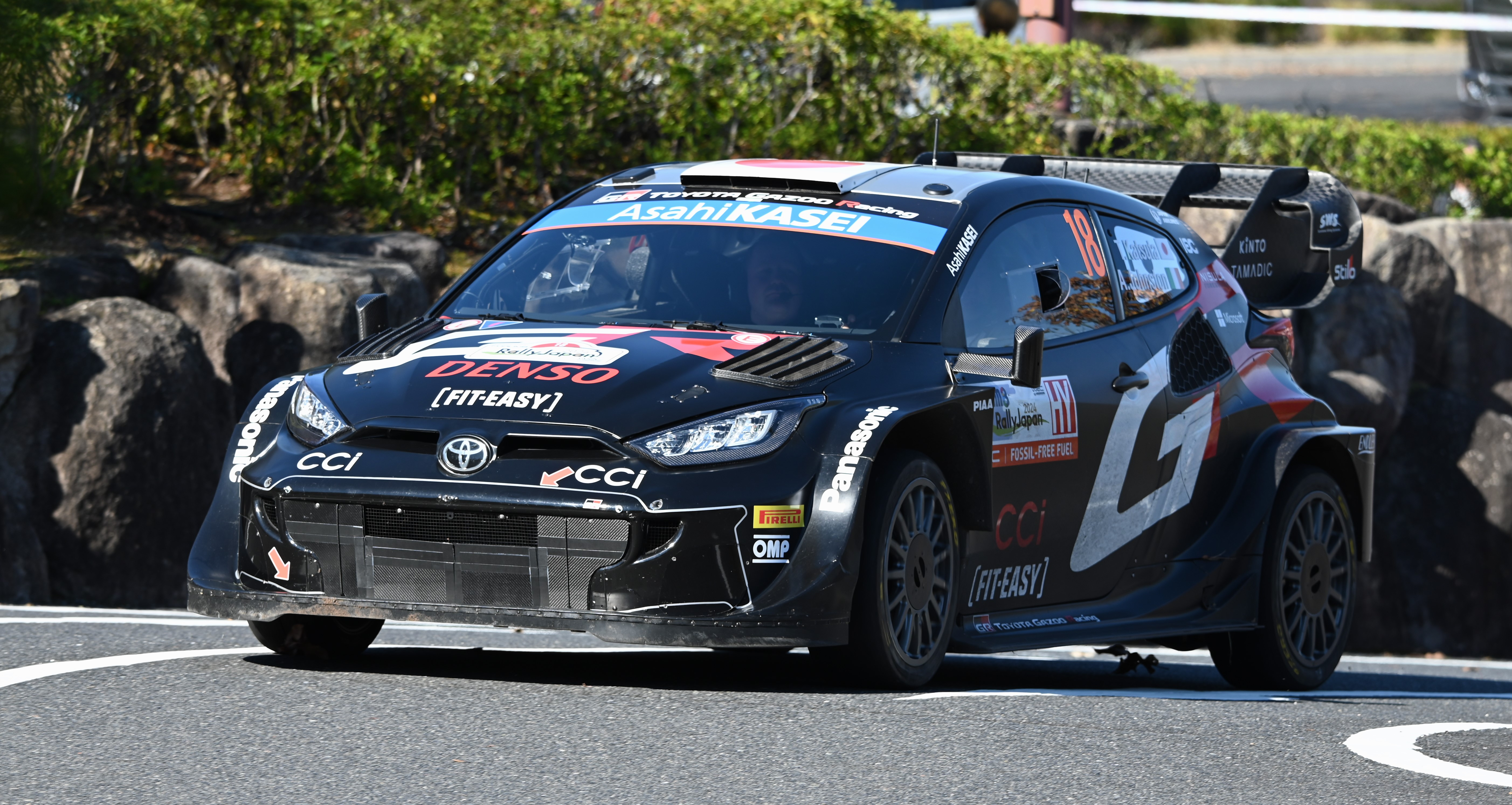
- Home hero Takamoto Katsuta driving a Toyota GR Yaris Rally1 during the event.
- Host country: Japan
- Rally base: Toyota, Aichi Prefecture
- Dates run: 21 – 24 November 2024
- Start location: Toyota Stadium, Toyota
- Finish location: Toyota Stadium, Toyota
- Stages: 21 (302.59 km; 188.02 miles)
- Stage surface: Tarmac
- Transport distance: 714.60 km (444.03 miles)
- Overall distance: 1,017.19 km (632.05 miles)

Statistics
- Crews registered: 44
- Crews: 42 at start, 38 at finish

Overall results
- Overall winner: (United Kingdom) Elfyn Evans (United Kingdom) Scott Martin (Japan) Toyota Gazoo Racing WRT; 3:23:41.0
- Saturday Overall leader: (United Kingdom) Elfyn Evans (United Kingdom) Scott Martin (Japan) Toyota Gazoo Racing WRT; 2:40:26.0
- Sunday Accumulated leader: (Belgium) Thierry Neuville (Belgium) Martijn Wydaeghe (South Korea) Hyundai Shell Mobis WRT; 43:03.4
- Power Stage winner: (France) Sébastien Ogier (France) Vincent Landais (Japan) Toyota Gazoo Racing WRT; 8:38.5

Support category results
- WRC-2 winner: (Bulgaria) Nikolay Gryazin; Konstantin Aleksandrov; 3:33:45.3
- WRC-3 winner: (Paraguay) Diego Dominguez Jr. (Spain) Rogelio Peñate; 3:49:22.2

The 2024 Rally Japan (also known as the FORUM8 Rally Japan 2024) was a motor racing event for rally cars held from 21 to 24 November 2024. It marked the ninth running of the Rally Japan, and was the final round of the 2024 World Rally Championship, World Rally Championship-2 and World Rally Championship-3. The event was based in Nagoya in Chūbu Region, and was contested over twenty-one special stages covering a total competitive distance of 302.59 km (188.02 mi).

Elfyn Evans and Scott Martin were the defending rally winners, and their team, Toyota Gazoo Racing WRT, were the defending manufacturers' winners. Andreas Mikkelsen and Torstein Eriksen were the defending rally winners in the WRC-2 category. Jason Bailey and Shayne Peterson were the defending rally winners in the WRC-3 category.

Evans and Martin successfully defended their titles, so as their team Toyota. Thierry Neuville and Martijn Wydaeghe became the 2024 world champions, while Toyota snatched the manufacturer's title. Nikolay Gryazin and Konstantin Aleksandrov were the winners in the World Rally Championship-2 category, while Sami Pajari and Enni Mälkönen won the WRC-2 titles. Diego Dominguez Jr. and Rogelio Peñate were the winners in the World Rally Championship-3 category.

== Background ==
=== Entry list ===
The following crews entered into the rally. The event was opened to crews competing in the World Rally Championship, its support categories, the World Rally Championship-2, World Rally Championship-3 and privateer entries that were not registered to score points in any championship. Eight entered under Rally1 regulations, as were seventeen Rally2 crews in the World Rally Championship-2 and two Rally3 crew in the World Rally Championship-3.

Rally1 entries competing in the World Rally Championship
No.	Driver	Co-Driver	Entrant	Car	Championship eligibility	Tyre
8	(Estonia) Ott Tänak	(Estonia) Martin Järveoja	(South Korea) Hyundai Shell Mobis WRT	Hyundai i20 N Rally1	Driver, Co-driver, Manufacturer	P
9	(Norway) Andreas Mikkelsen	(Norway) Torstein Eriksen	(South Korea) Hyundai Shell Mobis WRT	Hyundai i20 N Rally1	Driver, Co-driver, Manufacturer	P
11	(Belgium) Thierry Neuville	(Belgium) Martijn Wydaeghe	(South Korea) Hyundai Shell Mobis WRT	Hyundai i20 N Rally1	Driver, Co-driver, Manufacturer	P
13	(Luxembourg) Grégoire Munster	(Belgium) Louis Louka	(United Kingdom) M-Sport Ford WRT	Ford Puma Rally1	Driver, Co-driver, Manufacturer	P
16	(France) Adrien Fourmaux	(France) Alexandre Coria	(United Kingdom) M-Sport Ford WRT	Ford Puma Rally1	Driver, Co-driver, Manufacturer	P
17	(France) Sébastien Ogier	(France) Vincent Landais	(Japan) Toyota Gazoo Racing WRT	Toyota GR Yaris Rally1	Driver, Co-driver, Manufacturer	P
18	(Japan) Takamoto Katsuta	(Republic of Ireland) Aaron Johnston	(Japan) Toyota Gazoo Racing WRT	Toyota GR Yaris Rally1	Driver, Co-driver, Manufacturer	P
33	(United Kingdom) Elfyn Evans	(United Kingdom) Scott Martin	(Japan) Toyota Gazoo Racing WRT	Toyota GR Yaris Rally1	Driver, Co-driver, Manufacturer	P

Rally2 entries competing in the World Rally Championship-2
No.	Driver	Co-Driver	Entrant	Car	Championship eligibility	Tyre
20	(Finland) Sami Pajari	(Finland) Enni Mälkönen	(Finland) Printsport	Toyota GR Yaris Rally2	Challenger Driver, Challenger Co-driver	P
21	(Bulgaria) Nikolay Gryazin	Konstantin Aleksandrov (Note: Konstantin Aleksandrov is Russian, but he competes as a neutral competitor using the ANA flag as Russian national emblems were banned by the association due to the Russian invasion of Ukraine.)	(Bulgaria) Nikolay Gryazin	Citroën C3 Rally2	Challenger Driver, Challenger Co-driver	P
22	(Poland) Kajetan Kajetanowicz	(Poland) Maciej Szczepaniak	(Poland) Kajetan Kajetanowicz	Škoda Fabia RS Rally2	Challenger Driver, Challenger Co-driver	P
23	(Spain) Jan Solans	(Spain) Rodrigo Sanjuan de Eusebio	(Spain) Jan Solans	Toyota GR Yaris Rally2	Challenger Driver, Challenger Co-driver	P
24	(Republic of Ireland) Josh McErlean	(Republic of Ireland) James Fulton	(Germany) Toksport WRT 2	Škoda Fabia RS Rally2	Team	P
25	(United Kingdom) Gus Greensmith	(Sweden) Jonas Andersson	(Germany) Toksport WRT	Škoda Fabia RS Rally2	Driver, Co-driver, Team	P
26	(Poland) Daniel Chwist	(Poland) Kamil Heller	(Poland) Daniel Chwist	Škoda Fabia RS Rally2	Challenger Driver, Challenger Co-driver	P
27	(Greece) George Vassilakis	(United Kingdom) Allan Harryman	(Greece) George Vassilakis	Ford Fiesta Rally2	Challenger/Masters Driver, Challenger/Masters Co-driver	P
28	(Republic of Ireland) Eamonn Boland	(Republic of Ireland) Michael Joseph Morrissey	(Republic of Ireland) Eamonn Boland	Škoda Fabia RS Rally2	Challenger/Masters Driver, Challenger/Masters Co-driver	P
29	(Japan) Yuki Yamamoto	(Finland) Marko Salminen	(Japan) Toyota Gazoo Racing WRT NG	Toyota GR Yaris Rally2	Challenger Driver, Challenger Co-driver	P
30	(United Kingdom) Chris Ingram	(United States) Alexander Kihurani	(United Kingdom) Chris Ingram	Toyota GR Yaris Rally2	Challenger Driver, Challenger Co-driver	P
31	(Japan) Hiroki Arai	(Japan) Shunsuke Matsuo	Ahead Japan Racing Team	Škoda Fabia R5	Challenger Driver, Challenger Co-driver	P
32	(Finland) Heikki Kovalainen	(Japan) Sae Kitagawa	(Finland) Heikki Kovalainen	Toyota GR Yaris Rally2	Challenger Driver, Challenger Co-driver	P
34	(Japan) Norihiko Katsuta	(Japan) Yusuke Kimura	(Japan) Toyota Gazoo Racing WRJ	Toyota GR Yaris Rally2	Challenger/Masters Driver, Challenger Co-driver	P
35	(Japan) Fumio Nutahara	(Japan) Shungo Azuma	(Japan) Fumio Nutahara	Toyota GR Yaris Rally2	Challenger/Masters Driver, Challenger Co-driver	P
36	(Japan) Hikaru Kogure	(Finland) Topi Matias Luhtinen	(Japan) Toyota Gazoo Racing WRT NG	Toyota GR Yaris Rally2	Challenger Driver, Challenger Co-driver	P
37	(Japan) Osamu Fukunaga	(Japan) Misako Saida	(Japan) Osamu Fukunaga	Škoda Fabia Rally2 evo	Challenger/Masters Driver, Challenger Co-driver	P
38	(Japan) Satoshi Imai	(New Zealand) Jason Farmer	(Japan) Satoshi Imai	Citroën C3 Rally2	Challenger Driver, Challenger Co-driver	P

Rally3 entries competing in the World Rally Championship-3
No.	Driver	Co-Driver	Entrant	Car	Tyre
39	(Paraguay) Diego Dominguez Jr.	(Spain) Rogelio Peñate	(Paraguay) Diego Dominguez Jr.	Ford Fiesta Rally3	P
40	(France) Ghjuvanni Rossi	(France) Kylian Sarmezan	(France) Ghjuvanni Rossi	Renault Clio Rally3	P

Other major entries
No.	Driver	Co-Driver	Entrant	Car	Championship eligibility	Tyre
45	(Belgium) Armand Fumal	(France) Jules Escartefigue	(Belgium) Armand Fumal	Alpine A110 Rally RGT	Masters Driver	P

=== Itinerary ===
All dates and times are JST (UTC+9).

Date	No.	Time span	Stage name	Distance
21 November	—	After 9:01	Kuragaike Park [Shakedown]	2.75 km
21 November		After 18:52	Opening ceremony, Toyota Stadium	—N/a
21 November	SS1	After 19:05	Toyota Stadium SSS 1	2.15 km
22 November		6:19 – 6:34	Service A, Toyota Stadium	—N/a
22 November	SS2	After 7:44	Isegami's Tunnel 1	23.67 km
22 November	SS3	After 8:44	Inabu / Shitara 1	19.38 km
22 November	SS4	After 10:12	Shinshiro 1	17.41 km
22 November		12:07 – 12:27	Regroup, Inabu Donguri-no-Yu	—N/a
22 November		12:27 – 12:42	Tyre fitting zone, Inabu Donguri Koubou	—N/a
22 November	SS5	After 13:32	Isegami's Tunnel 2	23.67 km
22 November	SS6	After 14:32	Inabu / Shitara 2	19.38 km
22 November	SS7	After 16:00	Shinshiro 2	17.41 km
22 November		12:07 – 12:27	Regroup, Okazaki Central Park General Gymnasium	—N/a
22 November	SS8	After 18:35	Okazaki SSS 1	2.54 km
22 November	SS9	After 18:44	Okazaki SSS 2	2.54 km
22 November		19:44 – 20:29	Flexi service B, Toyota Stadium	—N/a
23 November		6:19 – 6:34	Service C, Toyota Stadium	—N/a
23 November	SS10	After 8:05	Mt. Kasagi 1	16.47 km
23 November	SS11	After 9:03	Nenoue Kougen 1	2.54 km
23 November	SS12	After 10:16	Ena 1	22.79 km
23 November		11:21 – 12:04	Regroup, Nakatsugawa Park	—N/a
23 November		12:04 – 12:19	Tyre fitting zone, Nakatsugawa Park	—N/a
23 November	SS13	After 13:05	Mt. Kasagi 2	16.47 km
23 November	SS14	After 14:08	Nenoue Kougen 2	2.54 km
23 November	SS15	After 15:16	Ena 2	22.79 km
23 November		17:26 – 18:07	Regroup, Toyota Stadium	—N/a
23 November		18:07 – 18:52	Flexi service D, Toyota Stadium	—N/a
23 November	SS16	After 19:05	Toyota Stadium SSS 2	2.15 km
24 November		6:26 – 6:41	Service E, Toyota Stadium	—N/a
24 November	SS17	After 7:39	Nukata 1	20.23 km
24 November	SS18	After 8:35	Lake Mikawako 1	13.98 km
24 November	SS19	After 9:38	Nukata 2	20.23 km
24 November		11:03 – 11:49	Regroup, Toyota Stadium	—N/a
24 November		11:49 – 12:04	Flexi service F, Toyota Stadium	—N/a
24 November	SS20	After 12:17	Toyota Stadium SSS 3	2.15 km
24 November		12:27 – 12:58	Regroup, Toyota Stadium B1 Parking	—N/a
24 November	SS21	After 14:15	Lake Mikawako 2 [Power Stage]	13.98 km
24 November		After 15:30	Official finish, Toyota Stadium	—N/a

== Report ==
=== WRC Rally1 ===
==== Classification ====
Position		No.	Driver	Co-driver	Entrant	Car	Time	Difference	Points			
Event	Class	No.	Driver	Co-driver	Entrant	Car	Time	Difference	SAT	SUN	WPS	Total
1	1	33	Elfyn Evans	Scott Martin	Toyota Gazoo Racing WRT	Toyota GR Yaris Rally1	3:24:41.0	0.0	18	4	3	25
2	2	17	Sébastien Ogier	Vincent Landais	Toyota Gazoo Racing WRT	Toyota GR Yaris Rally1	3:25:08.3	+1:27.3	15	5	5	25
3	3	16	Adrien Fourmaux	Alexandre Coria	M-Sport Ford WRT	Ford Puma Rally1	3:25:36.5	+1:55.5	13	3	0	16
4	4	18	Takamoto Katsuta	Aaron Johnston	Toyota Gazoo Racing WRT	Toyota GR Yaris Rally1	3:25:43.6	+2:02:6	10	2	2	14
5	5	13	Grégoire Munster	Louis Louka	M-Sport Ford WRT	Ford Puma Rally1	3:26:52.5	+3:11.5	8	1	0	9
6	6	11	Thierry Neuville	Martijn Wydaeghe	Hyundai Shell Mobis WRT	Hyundai i20 N Rally1	3:30:50.1	+6:54.1	6	7	4	17
31	7	9	Andreas Mikkelsen	Torstein Eriksen	Hyundai Shell Mobis WRT	Hyundai i20 N Rally1	4:55:42.7	+1:32:01.7	0	6	1	7
Retired SS17		8	Ott Tänak	Martin Järveoja	Hyundai Shell Mobis WRT	Hyundai i20 N Rally1	Accident		0	0	0	0

==== Special stages ====
Stage	Winners	Car	Time	Class leaders
SD	Tänak / Järveoja	Hyundai i20 N Rally1	2:18.2	—N/a
SS1	Fourmaux / Coria	Ford Puma Rally1	1:44.4	Fourmaux / Coria
SS2	Neuville / Wydaeghe	Hyundai i20 N Rally1	18:27.4	Tänak / Järveoja
SS3	Ogier / Landais	Toyota GR Yaris Rally1	12:14.8	Tänak / Järveoja
SS4	Evans / Martin	Toyota GR Yaris Rally1	9:49.7	Evans / Martin
SS5	Tänak / Järveoja	Hyundai i20 N Rally1	18:03.2	Tänak / Järveoja
SS6	Tänak / Järveoja	Hyundai i20 N Rally1	12:00.1	Tänak / Järveoja
SS7	Evans / Martin	Toyota GR Yaris Rally1	9:45.5	Tänak / Järveoja
SS8	Katsuta / Johnston	Toyota GR Yaris Rally1	2:01.1	Tänak / Järveoja
SS9	Evans / Martin	Toyota GR Yaris Rally1	2:01.9	Tänak / Järveoja
SS9	Fourmaux / Coria	Ford Puma Rally1	2:01.9	Tänak / Järveoja
SS9	Katsuta / Johnston	Toyota GR Yaris Rally1	2:01.9	Tänak / Järveoja
SS10	Evans / Martin	Toyota GR Yaris Rally1	12:04.3	Tänak / Järveoja
SS11	Neuville / Wydaeghe	Hyundai i20 N Rally1	7:40.2	Tänak / Järveoja
SS12	Ogier / Landais	Toyota GR Yaris Rally1	16:39.3	Tänak / Järveoja
SS13	Tänak / Järveoja	Hyundai i20 N Rally1	11:30.1	Tänak / Järveoja
SS14	Neuville / Wydaeghe	Hyundai i20 N Rally1	7:32.6	Tänak / Järveoja
SS14	Ogier / Landais	Toyota GR Yaris Rally1	7:32.6	Tänak / Järveoja
SS15	Ogier / Landais	Toyota GR Yaris Rally1	16:06.4	Tänak / Järveoja
SS16	Tänak / Järveoja	Hyundai i20 N Rally1	1:42.6	Tänak / Järveoja
SS17	Mikkelsen / Eriksen	Hyundai i20 N Rally1	11:57.5	Evans / Martin
SS18	Neuville / Wydaeghe	Hyundai i20 N Rally1	8:42.4	Evans / Martin
SS19	Neuville / Wydaeghe	Hyundai i20 N Rally1	11:51.9	Evans / Martin
SS19	Ogier / Landais	Toyota GR Yaris Rally1	11:51.9	Evans / Martin
SS20	Katsuta / Johnston	Toyota GR Yaris Rally1	1:44.1	Evans / Martin
SS21	Ogier / Landais	Toyota GR Yaris Rally1	8:38.5	Evans / Martin

==== Championship standings ====
- **Bold text** indicates 2024 World Champions.

Pos.	Drivers' championships			Co-drivers' championships			Manufacturers' championships		
Pos.	Move	Driver	Points	Move	Co-driver	Points	Move	Manufacturer	Points
1		**Thierry Neuville**	242		**Martijn Wydaeghe**	242	1	**Toyota Gazoo Racing WRT**	561
2	1	Elfyn Evans	210	1	Scott Martin	210	1	Hyundai Shell Mobis WRT	558
3	1	Ott Tänak	200	1	Martin Järveoja	200		M-Sport Ford WRT	267
4		Sébastien Ogier	191		Vincent Landais	191			
5		Adrien Fourmaux	162		Alexandre Coria	162			

=== WRC-2 Rally2 ===
==== Classification ====
Position		No.	Driver	Co-driver	Entrant	Car	Time	Difference	Points	
Event	Class	No.	Driver	Co-driver	Entrant	Car	Time	Difference	Class	Event
7	1	21	Nikolay Gryazin	Konstantin Aleksandrov	Nikolay Gryazin	Citroën C3 Rally2	3:33:45.3	0.0	25	4
8	2	20	Sami Pajari	Enni Mälkönen	Printsport	Toyota GR Yaris Rally2	3:35:31.8	+1:46.5	18	3
9	3	31	Hiroki Arai	Shunsuke Matsuo	Ahead Japan Racing Team	Škoda Fabia R5	3:37:05.3	+3:20.0	15	2
10	4	25	Gus Greensmith	Jonas Andersson	Toksport WRT	Škoda Fabia RS Rally2	3:37:56.8	+4:11.5	12	1
11	5	22	Kajetan Kajetanowicz	Maciej Szczepaniak	Kajetan Kajetanowicz	Škoda Fabia RS Rally2	3:40:31.9	+6:46.6	10	0
12	6	36	Hikaru Kogure	Topi Matias Luhtinen	Toyota Gazoo Racing WRT NG	Toyota GR Yaris Rally2	3:42:34.0	+8:48.7	8	0
13	7	34	Norihiko Katsuta	Yusuke Kimura	Toyota Gazoo Racing WRJ	Toyota GR Yaris Rally2	3:45:08.8	+11:23.5	6	0
14	8	35	Fumio Nutahara	Shungo Azuma	Fumio Nutahara	Toyota GR Yaris Rally2	3:49:02.4	+15:17.1	4	0
16	9	26	Daniel Chwist	Kamil Heller	Daniel Chwist	Škoda Fabia RS Rally2	3:51:03.0	+17:17.7	2	0
17	10	37	Osamu Fukunaga	Misako Saida	Osamu Fukunaga	Škoda Fabia Rally2 evo	3:52:34.9	+18:49.6	1	0
23	11	23	Jan Solans	Rodrigo Sanjuan de Eusebio	Jan Solans	Toyota GR Yaris Rally2	4:15:00.5	+41:15.2	0	0
24	12	27	George Vassilakis	Allan Harryman	George Vassilakis	Ford Fiesta Rally2	4:17:37.0	+43:51.7	0	0
26	13	28	Eamonn Boland	Michael Joseph Morrissey	Eamonn Boland	Škoda Fabia RS Rally2	4:27:51.3	+54:06.0	0	0
32	14	38	Satoshi Imai	Jason Farmer	Satoshi Imai	Citroën C3 Rally2	5:03:14.3	+1:29:29.0	0	0
Retired SS18		29	Yuki Yamamoto	Marko Salminen	Toyota Gazoo Racing WRT NG	Toyota GR Yaris Rally2	Accident		0	0
Retired SS18		30	Chris Ingram	Alexander Kihurani	Chris Ingram	Toyota GR Yaris Rally2	Suspension		0	0
Retired SS17		32	Heikki Kovalainen	Sae Kitagawa	Heikki Kovalainen	Toyota GR Yaris Rally2	Accident		0	0

==== Special stages ====
Overall
Stage	Winners	Car	Time	Class leaders
SD	Ingram / Kihurani	Toyota GR Yaris Rally2	2:17.7	—N/a
SS1	Gryazin / Aleksandrov	Citroën C3 Rally2	1:48.9	Gryazin / Aleksandrov
SS2	Gryazin / Aleksandrov	Citroën C3 Rally2	19:12.0	Gryazin / Aleksandrov
SS3	Gryazin / Aleksandrov	Citroën C3 Rally2	12:45.3	Gryazin / Aleksandrov
SS4	Gryazin / Aleksandrov	Citroën C3 Rally2	10:22.1	Gryazin / Aleksandrov
SS5	Stage cancelled			
SS6	Gryazin / Aleksandrov	Citroën C3 Rally2	12:41.4	Gryazin / Aleksandrov
SS7	Gryazin / Aleksandrov	Citroën C3 Rally2	10:21.3	Gryazin / Aleksandrov
SS8	Gryazin / Aleksandrov	Citroën C3 Rally2	2:07.2	Gryazin / Aleksandrov
SS9	Gryazin / Aleksandrov	Citroën C3 Rally2	2:05.5	Gryazin / Aleksandrov
SS10	Arai / Matsuo	Škoda Fabia R5	12:44.3	Gryazin / Aleksandrov
SS11	Gryazin / Aleksandrov	Citroën C3 Rally2	8:11.5	Gryazin / Aleksandrov
SS12	Stage cancelled			
SS13	Arai / Matsuo	Škoda Fabia R5	12:12.8	Gryazin / Aleksandrov
SS14	Pajari / Mälkönen	Toyota GR Yaris Rally2	8:04.6	Gryazin / Aleksandrov
SS15	Pajari / Mälkönen	Toyota GR Yaris Rally2	17:07.3	Gryazin / Aleksandrov
SS16	Kajetanowicz / Szczepaniak	Škoda Fabia RS Rally2	1:47.1	Gryazin / Aleksandrov
SS17	Gryazin / Aleksandrov	Citroën C3 Rally2	12:51.4	Gryazin / Aleksandrov
SS18	Gryazin / Aleksandrov	Citroën C3 Rally2	9:18.8	Gryazin / Aleksandrov
SS19	Solans / Sanjuan de Eusebio	Toyota GR Yaris Rally2	12:46.5	Gryazin / Aleksandrov
SS20	Gryazin / Aleksandrov	Citroën C3 Rally2	1:49.5	Gryazin / Aleksandrov
SS21	Gryazin / Aleksandrov	Citroën C3 Rally2	9:12.9	Gryazin / Aleksandrov

Challenger
Stage	Winners	Car	Time	Class leaders
SD	Ingram / Kihurani	Toyota GR Yaris Rally2	2:17.7	—N/a
SS1	Gryazin / Aleksandrov	Citroën C3 Rally2	1:48.9	Gryazin / Aleksandrov
SS2	Gryazin / Aleksandrov	Citroën C3 Rally2	19:12.0	Gryazin / Aleksandrov
SS3	Gryazin / Aleksandrov	Citroën C3 Rally2	12:45.3	Gryazin / Aleksandrov
SS4	Gryazin / Aleksandrov	Citroën C3 Rally2	10:22.1	Gryazin / Aleksandrov
SS5	Stage cancelled			
SS6	Gryazin / Aleksandrov	Citroën C3 Rally2	12:41.4	Gryazin / Aleksandrov
SS7	Gryazin / Aleksandrov	Citroën C3 Rally2	10:21.3	Gryazin / Aleksandrov
SS8	Gryazin / Aleksandrov	Citroën C3 Rally2	2:07.2	Gryazin / Aleksandrov
SS9	Gryazin / Aleksandrov	Citroën C3 Rally2	2:05.5	Gryazin / Aleksandrov
SS10	Arai / Matsuo	Škoda Fabia R5	12:44.3	Gryazin / Aleksandrov
SS11	Gryazin / Aleksandrov	Citroën C3 Rally2	8:11.5	Gryazin / Aleksandrov
SS12	Stage cancelled			
SS13	Arai / Matsuo	Škoda Fabia R5	12:12.8	Gryazin / Aleksandrov
SS14	Pajari / Mälkönen	Toyota GR Yaris Rally2	8:04.6	Gryazin / Aleksandrov
SS15	Pajari / Mälkönen	Toyota GR Yaris Rally2	17:07.3	Gryazin / Aleksandrov
SS16	Kajetanowicz / Szczepaniak	Škoda Fabia RS Rally2	1:47.1	Gryazin / Aleksandrov
SS17	Gryazin / Aleksandrov	Citroën C3 Rally2	12:51.4	Gryazin / Aleksandrov
SS18	Gryazin / Aleksandrov	Citroën C3 Rally2	9:18.8	Gryazin / Aleksandrov
SS19	Solans / Sanjuan de Eusebio	Toyota GR Yaris Rally2	12:46.5	Gryazin / Aleksandrov
SS20	Gryazin / Aleksandrov	Citroën C3 Rally2	1:49.5	Gryazin / Aleksandrov
SS21	Gryazin / Aleksandrov	Citroën C3 Rally2	9:12.9	Gryazin / Aleksandrov

==== Championship standings ====
- **Bold text** indicates 2024 World Champions.

Pos.	Open Drivers' championships			Open Co-drivers' championships			Teams' championships			Challenger Drivers' championships			Challenger Co-drivers' championships		
Pos.	Move	Driver	Points	Move	Co-driver	Points	Move	Manufacturer	Points	Move	Manufacturer	Points	Move	Driver	Points
1	2	**Sami Pajari**	126	1	**Enni Mälkönen**	126		**DG Sport Compétition**	252		**Sami Pajari**	136		**Enni Mälkönen**	136
2	1	Oliver Solberg	123	1	Elliott Edmondson	123		Toksport WRT	205		Nikolay Gryazin	130		Konstantin Aleksandrov	130
3	1	Nikolay Gryazin	116		Konstantin Aleksandrov	116		Toksport WRT 2	145		Kajetan Kajetanowicz	94		Maciej Szczepaniak	94
4	2	Yohan Rossel	111		Maciej Szczepaniak	69		Toyota Gazoo Racing WRT NG	91		Lauri Joona	78		Janni Hussi	78
5		Kajetan Kajetanowicz	69		Janni Hussi	58					Jan Solans	71		Rodrigo Sanjuan de Eusebio	71

=== WRC-3 Rally3 ===
==== Classification ====
Position		No.	Driver	Co-driver	Entrant	Car	Time	Difference	Points
Event	Class	No.	Driver	Co-driver	Entrant	Car	Time	Difference	Points
15	1	39	Diego Domínguez Jr.	Rogelio Peñate	Diego Domínguez Jr.	Ford Fiesta Rally3	3:49:22.2	0.0	**25**
21	2	40	Ghjuvanni Rossi	Kylian Sarmezan	Ghjuvanni Rossi	Renault Clio Rally3	4:09:01.8	+19:39.6	**18**

==== Special stages ====
Stage	Winners	Car	Time	Class leaders
SD	Dominguez / Peñate	Ford Fiesta Rally3	2:27.5	—N/a
SS1	Dominguez / Peñate	Ford Fiesta Rally3	1:56.2	Dominguez / Peñate
SS2	Rossi / Sarmezan	Renault Clio Rally3	20:56.7	Rossi / Sarmezan
SS3	Dominguez / Peñate	Ford Fiesta Rally3	14:02.8	Rossi / Sarmezan
SS4	Dominguez / Peñate	Ford Fiesta Rally3	11:18.9	Rossi / Sarmezan
SS5	Stage cancelled			
SS6	Dominguez / Peñate	Ford Fiesta Rally3	13:38.7	Dominguez / Peñate
SS7	Rossi / Sarmezan	Renault Clio Rally3	11:15.9	Dominguez / Peñate
SS8	Rossi / Sarmezan	Renault Clio Rally3	2:16.0	Dominguez / Peñate
SS9	Dominguez / Peñate	Ford Fiesta Rally3	2:12.2	Dominguez / Peñate
SS10	Dominguez / Peñate	Ford Fiesta Rally3	13:22.4	Dominguez / Peñate
SS11	Rossi / Sarmezan	Renault Clio Rally3	8:47.9	Dominguez / Peñate
SS12	Stage cancelled			
SS13	Dominguez / Peñate	Ford Fiesta Rally3	12:58.1	Dominguez / Peñate
SS14	Dominguez / Peñate	Ford Fiesta Rally3	8:44.4	Dominguez / Peñate
SS15	Dominguez / Peñate	Ford Fiesta Rally3	18:17.2	Dominguez / Peñate
SS16	Dominguez / Peñate	Ford Fiesta Rally3	1:57.7	Dominguez / Peñate
SS17	Rossi / Sarmezan	Renault Clio Rally3	14:09.3	Dominguez / Peñate
SS18	Rossi / Sarmezan	Renault Clio Rally3	10:01.1	Dominguez / Peñate
SS19	Rossi / Sarmezan	Renault Clio Rally3	13:53.4	Dominguez / Peñate
SS20	Dominguez / Peñate	Ford Fiesta Rally3	1:57.1	Dominguez / Peñate
SS21	Rossi / Sarmezan	Renault Clio Rally3	9:52.2	Dominguez / Peñate

==== Championship standings ====
- **Bold text** indicates 2024 World Champions.

Pos.	Drivers' championships			Co-drivers' championships		
Pos.	Move	Driver	Points	Move	Co-driver	Points
1		**Diego Dominguez Jr.**	125		**Rogelio Peñate**	125
2		Mattéo Chatillon	73		Maxence Cornuau	73
3		Romet Jürgenson	61		Siim Oja	61
4	3	Ghjuvanni Rossi	61	3	Kylian Sarmezan	61
5	1	Jan Černý	55	1	Ondřej Krajča	55

== Notes ==
Previous rally: 2024 Central European Rally	2024 FIA World Rally Championship	Next rally: 2025 Monte Carlo Rally (2025)
Previous rally: 2023 Rally Japan	2024 Rally Japan	Next rally: 2025 Rally Japan
