= Scott Martin (co-driver) =

British rally co-driver (born 1981)

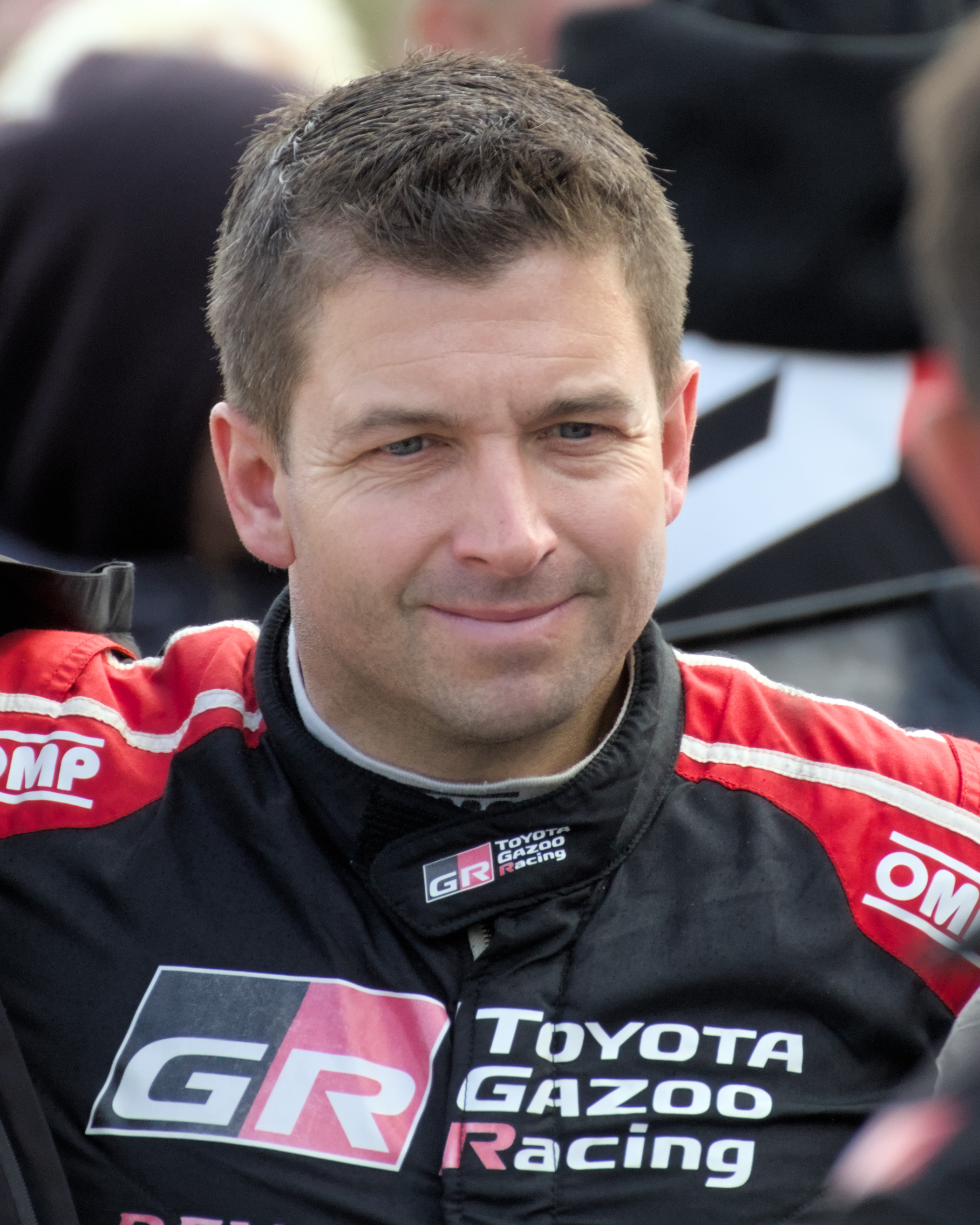
- Martin at the 2023 Central European Rally

Personal information
- Nationality: (United Kingdom) British
- Full name: Alistair Scott Martin
- Born: 6 November 1981 (age 45); Carlisle, Cumbria, England

World Rally Championship record
- Years active: 2004–present
- Driver: (United Kingdom) Matthew Wilson (United Kingdom) Barry Clark (United Kingdom) Mark Higgins (United Arab Emirates) Khalid Al-Qassimi (Republic of Ireland) Craig Breen (United Kingdom) Elfyn Evans
- Teams: Stobart Ford, Citroën, M-Sport, Toyota
- Rallies: 208
- Championships: 1 (2026)
- Rally wins: 12
- Podiums: 50
- Stage wins: 230
- Total points: 1655
- First rally: 2004 Wales Rally GB
- First win: 2020 Rally Sweden
- Last win: 2026 Rally Japan
- Last rally: 2026 Rally Italia Sardegna

Alistair Scott Martin (born 6 November 1981) is a British rallying co-driver, who competes in the FIA World Rally Championship. Since 2019, he has co-driven for Elfyn Evans, with whom he won the 2026 World Rally Championship. Previously, he co-drove for Craig Breen, between 2014 and 2018, before moving to M-Sport Ford WRT to partner Evans. This came about as Breen was dropped by Citroen Total WRT at the end of the 2018 WRC season, due to the downscaling of Citroen's rally operation, and their re-signing of Sébastien Ogier.

== Biography ==
Martin began his rallying career in 2001 co-driving at a national level in the UK. With Matthew Wilson in 2004, he finished as second outright co-driver in the British Rally Championship (BRC) in the Ford Focus RS. After the 2004 season, Martin was accepted into the MSA British Rally Elite Scheme, a specialist training scheme for young British rally drivers.

In 2005, Martin was involved in a serious accident on the opening round of the BRC, the Rally of Wales, and was airlifted to hospital. Later that year, he achieved his first international win on the Trackrod Rally with Wilson. The team also finished first on the Colin McRae Stages Rally.

In 2006, Martin, with Scottish driver Barry Clark in the Ford Fiesta ST, scored third place in the Fiesta Sporting Trophy International (FSTi) series and third place in the S1600 category of the BRC. The following year, he achieved his first win in an international series in the FSTi with Clark, and with Mark Higgins, he was placed overall third in the FIA Production World Rally Championship.

Throughout the period 2008–2011, Martin co-drove with Matthew Wilson in the Ford Focus RS (2008–10) and Ford Fiesta RS (2011), competing in the full WRC series. The pair achieved seventh place in the overall classification in 2009 and again in 2011, when they were placed fourth in the Repco Rally Australia, his best WRC result.

Martin participated in only two WRC events in 2012, then in 2013, competed as co-driver with Sheikh Khalid Al-Qassimi in the Citroen DS3. The crew took part in seven WRC events, and in five Middle East Rally Championship (MERC) events, in which they were placed second overall.

At the end of 2013, Martin had competed in 82 WRC rallies. He stood 13th in the IRDA (International Rally Drivers Association) ranking of co-drivers, with 2844 points, making him the highest-placed British co-driver. In 2014, he and Craig Breen won the Acropolis Rally in Greece – removed that year from the list of FIA championships – driving the Peugeot 208 T16, and the Ravens Rock Rally in Ireland driving the Ford Fiesta RS.

In 2019, Martin co-drove Elfyn Evans with M-Sport World Rally Team with which they achieved two third places as their best results.

Martin followed Evans to Toyota Gazoo Racing WRT in 2020, and won his first WRC rally in Sweden that year, followed by a win at Rally Turkey. Two more wins followed in 2021, in addition to five second place finishes, leading to a second consecutive runner-up spot in the co-drivers' championship. Following a disappointing 2022 season, Martin and Evans ended their near two year win drought win at the 2023 Rally of Croatia. Between 2020 and 2025, Evans and Martin finished in second position in the WRC on five occasions, only failing to do so in 2022 when they finished fourth. They finally won the championship at the final round of the 2026 World Rally Championship.

== Other activities ==
In 2025, Martin co-founded the World Rally Drivers Alliance alongside former Toyota teammate and fellow co-driver Julien Ingrassia in response to a controversy surrounding Mohammed Ben Sulayem's change in the International Sporting Code, which imposed harsh penalties against the use of profanities by drivers and co-drivers during events sanctioned by the Fédération Internationale de l'Automobile (FIA). This happened in conjunction with Adrien Fourmaux's €10,000 fine for swearing on a live broadcast in a stop control interview at 2025 Rally Sweden.

== WRC victories ==
#	Event	Season	Driver	Car
1	68th Rally Sweden	2020	(United Kingdom) Elfyn Evans	Toyota Yaris WRC
2	13. Marmaris Rally of Turkey	2020	(United Kingdom) Elfyn Evans	Toyota Yaris WRC
3	54° Rally de Portugal	2021	(United Kingdom) Elfyn Evans	Toyota Yaris WRC
4	70th Rally Finland	2021	(United Kingdom) Elfyn Evans	Toyota Yaris WRC
5	3. Croatia Rally	2023	(United Kingdom) Elfyn Evans	Toyota GR Yaris Rally1
6	72nd Rally Finland	2023	(United Kingdom) Elfyn Evans	Toyota GR Yaris Rally1
7	8th Rally Japan	2023	(United Kingdom) Elfyn Evans	Toyota GR Yaris Rally1
8	9th Rally Japan	2024	(United Kingdom) Elfyn Evans	Toyota GR Yaris Rally1
9	72nd Rally Sweden	2025	(United Kingdom) Elfyn Evans	Toyota GR Yaris Rally1
10	(Kenya) 73rd Safari Rally	2025	(United Kingdom) Elfyn Evans	Toyota GR Yaris Rally1
11	73rd Rally Sweden	2026	(United Kingdom) Elfyn Evans	Toyota GR Yaris Rally1
12	11th Rally Japan	2026	(United Kingdom) Elfyn Evans	Toyota GR Yaris Rally1

== Results ==
=== WRC results ===
Year	Entrant	Car	1	2	3	4	5	6	7	8	9	10	11	12	13	14	15	16	WDC	Points
2004	M-Sport	Ford Focus RS WRC 02	MON	SWE	MEX	NZL	CYP	GRE	TUR	ARG	FIN	GER	JPN	GBR; 13	ITA	FRA	ESP	AUS	NC	0
2005	Stobart	Ford Focus RS WRC	MON	SWE	MEX	NZL	ITA	CYP	TUR	GRE	ARG	FIN	GER	GBR; 15	JPN	FRA	ESP	AUS	NC	0
2006	Barry Clark	Ford Fiesta ST	MON	SWE	MEX	ESP; Ret	FRA; 40	ARG; 49	ITA	GRE	GER; 35	FIN; 37	JPN	CYP	TUR	AUS	NZL	GBR; 30	NC	0
2007	Mark Higgins	Mitsubishi Lancer Evo IX	MON	SWE; Ret		MEX; 10				GRE; 18						JPN; 19	IRE; Ret	GBR; 16	NC	0
2007	Barry Clark	Ford Fiesta ST			NOR; 29		POR; 24	ARG	ITA; 32		FIN; 55	GER; 45	NZL	ESP; 59	FRA				NC	0
2008	Stobart VK M-Sport	Ford Focus RS WRC 07	MON; 10	SWE; Ret	MEX; 6	ARG; Ret	JOR; 5	ITA; 12	GRE; 6	TUR; 7	FIN; 9	GER; 12	NZL; 17	ESP; 9	FRA; 8	JPN; 7	GBR; 9		10th	15
2009	Stobart VK M-Sport	Ford Focus RS WRC 08	IRE; 7	NOR; 7	CYP; 5	POR; Ret	ARG; 5	ITA; 6	GRE; 13	POL; 5	FIN; 8	AUS; 6	ESP; 7	GBR; 6					7th	28
2010	Stobart VK M-Sport	Ford Focus RS WRC 08	SWE; 7	MEX; 16	JOR; 5	TUR; 7	NZL; 6	POR; 6	BUL; 9	FIN; 6	GER; 6	JPN; 22	FRA; 8	ESP; 6	GBR; 7				7th	74
2011	Stobart M-Sport	Ford Fiesta RS WRC	SWE; 9	MEX; Ret	POR; 5	JOR; 5	ITA; 9	ARG; 8	GRE; 6	FIN; 8	GER; 11	AUS; 4	FRA; 10	ESP; Ret	GBR; 5				7th	63
2012	Go Fast Energy	Ford Fiesta RS WRC	MON; 11	SWE	MEX	POR	ARG	GRE	NZL	FIN	GER								25th	4
2012	M-Sport Ford	Ford Fiesta RS WRC										GBR; 8	FRA	ITA	ESP				25th	4
2013	Abu Dhabi Citroën Total WRT	Citroën DS3 WRC	MON	SWE; Ret	MEX	POR; 9	ARG	GRE; Ret	ITA; 10	FIN	GER; 11	AUS; 9	FRA	ESP; 11	GBR				23rd	5
2014	Craig Breen	Ford Fiesta RS WRC	MON	SWE; 9	MEX	POR	ARG	ITA	POL	FIN; Ret	GER	AUS	FRA	ESP					25th	2
2014	Yazeed Racing	Ford Fiesta RRC													GBR; 14				25th	2
2015	Saintéloc Junior Team	Peugeot 208 T16 R5	MON; 13	SWE	MEX	POR; Ret	ARG	ITA	POL	FIN; Ret	GER; 18	AUS	FRA; 17	ESP; Ret	GBR; 13				NC	0
2016	Abu Dhabi Total WRT	Citroën DS3 WRC	MON	SWE; 8	MEX	ARG	POR	ITA	POL; 7	FIN; 3	GER	CHN; C	FRA; 5	ESP; 10	GBR; Ret	AUS			10th	36
2017	Citroën Total Abu Dhabi WRT	Citroën DS3 WRC	MON; 5																9th	64
2017	Citroën Total Abu Dhabi WRT	Citroën C3 WRC		SWE; 5	MEX	FRA; 5	ARG; Ret	POR; 5	ITA; 25	POL; 11	FIN; 5	GER; 5	ESP	GBR; 15	AUS; Ret				9th	64
2018	Citroën Total Abu Dhabi WRT	Citroën C3 WRC	MON; 9	SWE; 2	MEX	FRA	ARG; Ret	POR; 7	ITA; 6	FIN; 8	GER; 7	TUR; Ret	GBR; 4	ESP; 9	AUS; 7				11th	67
2019	M-Sport Ford WRT	Ford Fiesta WRC	MON; Ret	SWE; 5	MEX; 3	FRA; 3	ARG; Ret	CHL; 4	POR; 5	ITA; 4	FIN; WD	GER	TUR; WD	GBR; 5	ESP; 6	AUS; C			5th	102
2020	Toyota Gazoo Racing WRT	Toyota Yaris WRC	MON; 3	SWE; 1	MEX; 4	EST; 4	TUR; 1	ITA; 4	MNZ; 29										2nd	114
2021	Toyota Gazoo Racing WRT	Toyota Yaris WRC	MON; 2	ARC; 5	CRO; 2	POR; 1	ITA; 2	KEN; 10	EST; 5	BEL; 4	GRE; 6	FIN; 1	ESP; 2	MNZ; 2					2nd	207
2022	Toyota Gazoo Racing WRT	Toyota GR Yaris Rally1	MON; 21	SWE; Ret	CRO; 5	POR; 2	ITA; 40	KEN; 2	EST; 2	FIN; 4	BEL; 2	GRE; Ret	NZL; Ret	ESP; 6	JPN; 5				4th	134
2023	Toyota Gazoo Racing WRT	Toyota GR Yaris Rally1	MON; 4	SWE; 5	MEX; 3	CRO; 1	POR; Ret	ITA; 4	KEN; 3	EST; 4	FIN; 1	GRE; 2	CHL; 3	EUR; 31	JPN; 1				2nd	216
2024	Toyota Gazoo Racing WRT	Toyota GR Yaris Rally1	MON; 3	SWE; 2	KEN; 4	CRO; 2	POR; 6	ITA; 4	POL; 2	LAT; 5	FIN; Ret	GRE; 18	CHL; 2	EUR; 2	JPN; 1				2nd	210
2025	Toyota Gazoo Racing WRT	Toyota GR Yaris Rally1	MON; 2	SWE; 1	KEN; 1	ESP; 3	POR; 6	ITA; 4	GRE; 4	EST; 6	FIN; 4	PAR; 2	CHL	EUR; 2	JPN; 2	SAU			2nd	289
2026	Toyota Gazoo Racing WRT	Toyota GR Yaris Rally1	MON; 2	SWE; 1	KEN; 13	CRO; 34	ESP; 2	POR; 3	JPN; 1	GRE; 5	EST; 6	FIN; 3	PAR; 2	CHL; 5	ITA; 5				1st	243
