= Toyota Gazoo Racing WRT =

World Rally Championship manufacturer team

- Full name: Toyota Gazoo Racing World Rally Team
- Base: Jyväskylä, Finland (Note: Team base); Japan (Note: Car homologations through Japan Automobile Federation)
- Team principal(s): Jari-Matti Latvala; Juha Kankkunen
- Drivers: (France) Sébastien Ogier (United Kingdom) Elfyn Evans (Sweden) Oliver Solberg (Japan) Takamoto Katsuta (Finland) Sami Pajari (Estonia) Ott Tänak (Finland) Kalle Rovanperä
- Co-drivers: (France) Vincent Landais (United Kingdom) Scott Martin (United Kingdom) Elliott Edmondson (Republic of Ireland) Aaron Johnston (Finland) Marko Salminen (Estonia) Martin Järveoja (Finland) Jonne Halttunen
- Chassis: Toyota GR Yaris Rally1; Toyota GR Yaris Rally2
- Tyres: Hankook

World Rally Championship history
- Debut: 2017 Monte Carlo Rally
- Manufacturers' Championships: 7 (2018, 2021, 2022, 2023, 2024, 2025, 2026)
- Drivers' Championships: 7 (2019, 2020, 2021, 2022, 2023, 2025, 2026)
- Rally wins: 74

The Toyota Gazoo Racing World Rally Team is a competitor of the World Rally Championship (WRC) based in Finland, serving as the entry for the car manufacturer Toyota. Its team principal is former WRC driver Jari-Matti Latvala and its drivers for 2026 include reigning champion Sébastien Ogier, alongside Elfyn Evans, Oliver Solberg, Takamoto Katsuta, and Sami Pajari. The team made its debut during the 2017 season, where it entered the Toyota Yaris WRC.

The team is a separate operational unit to the Toyota Gazoo Racing team that competes in the World Endurance Championship, but both are a part of Toyota Gazoo Racing Europe.

In 2018, the team won the championship for manufacturers, Toyota's first since 1999, followed by more wins in 2021 and 2022. The team have also delivered championship titles for drivers and co-drivers from 2019 to 2026.

== History ==
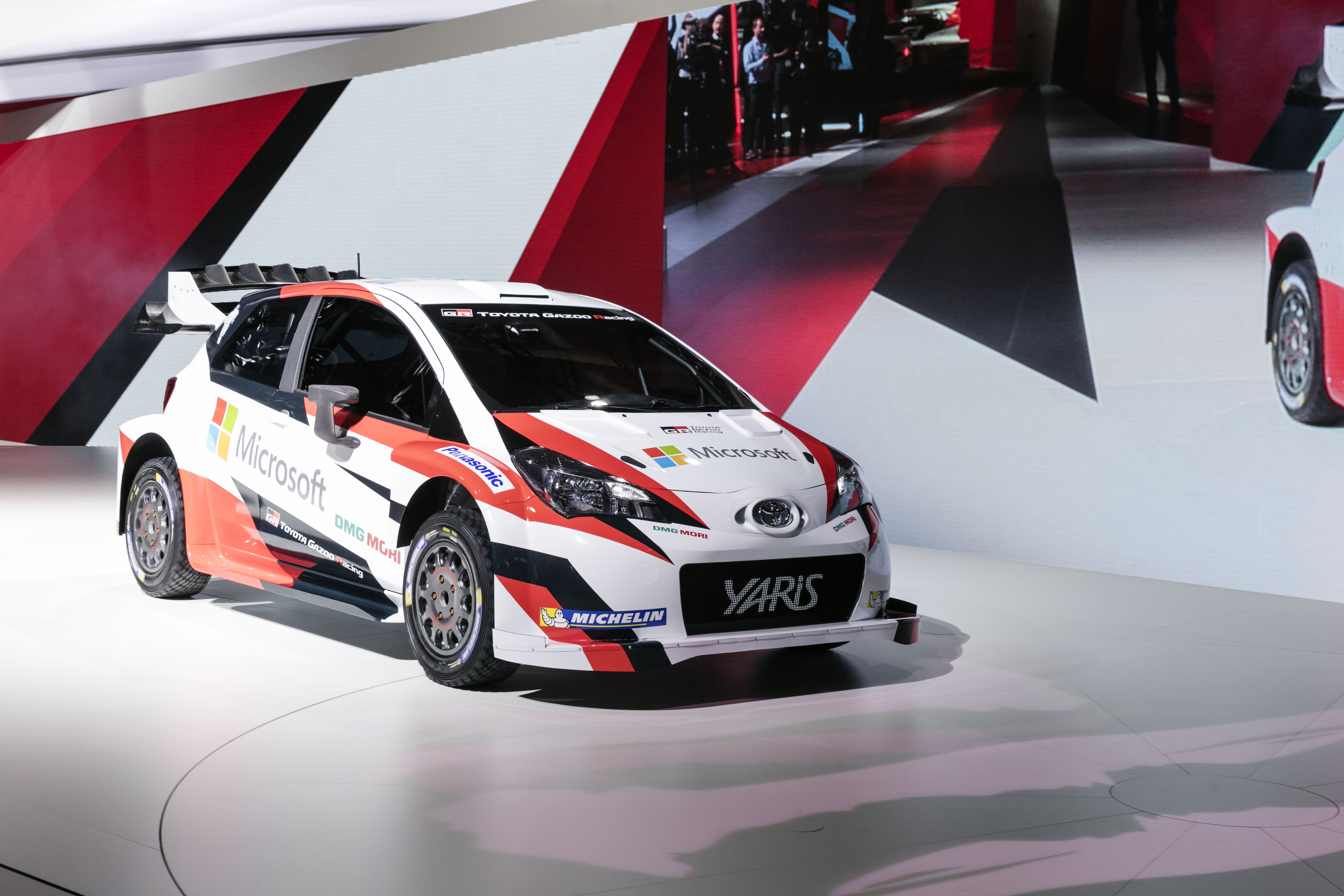
Toyota Yaris WRC premiere at the 2016 Paris Motor Show

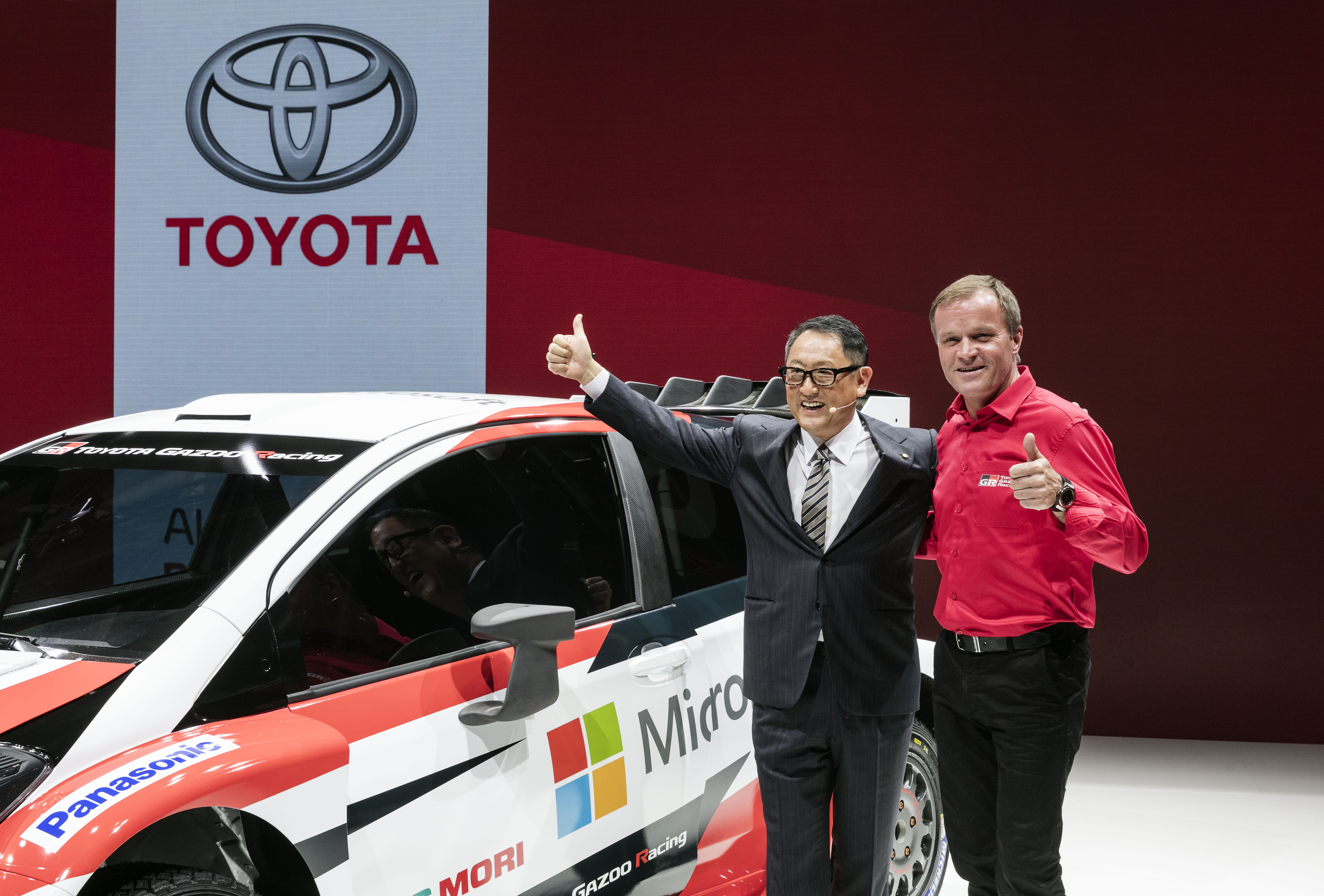
The brand new Toyota Yaris World Rally Car, set to compete in the 2017 WRC season, at the 2016 Paris Motor Show. On the left is Akio Toyoda, CEO of Toyota Motor Corporation, next to four time World Rally Drivers' Champion Tommi Mäkinen

In January 2015, Toyota officially announced its intention to return to the World Rally Championship in 2017. The manufacturer had last competed in the series in 1999 before withdrawing ahead of the 2000 season to focus on its Formula One project. For the new project, development of the Yaris WRC was delegated to Toyota Motorsport GmbH (TMG), the division that ran Toyota Team Europe and the previous WRC campaigns in the 1980s and 1990s with Group B and Group A Celicas, and the Toyota Corolla World Rally Car.

In July 2015 however, Toyota President Akio Toyoda elected to reassign responsibility for the project to Tommi Mäkinen, who based the team in his native Finland. Only the engine would be built by TMG, and by this time new World Rally Car regulations due for 2017 forced Mäkinen to shelve the Yaris WRC prototype and start anew.

Also in 2015, Toyota consolidated all its motorsport activities to operate under the banner of Toyota Gazoo Racing, with TMG being renamed Toyota Gazoo Racing Europe.

=== 2017 ===
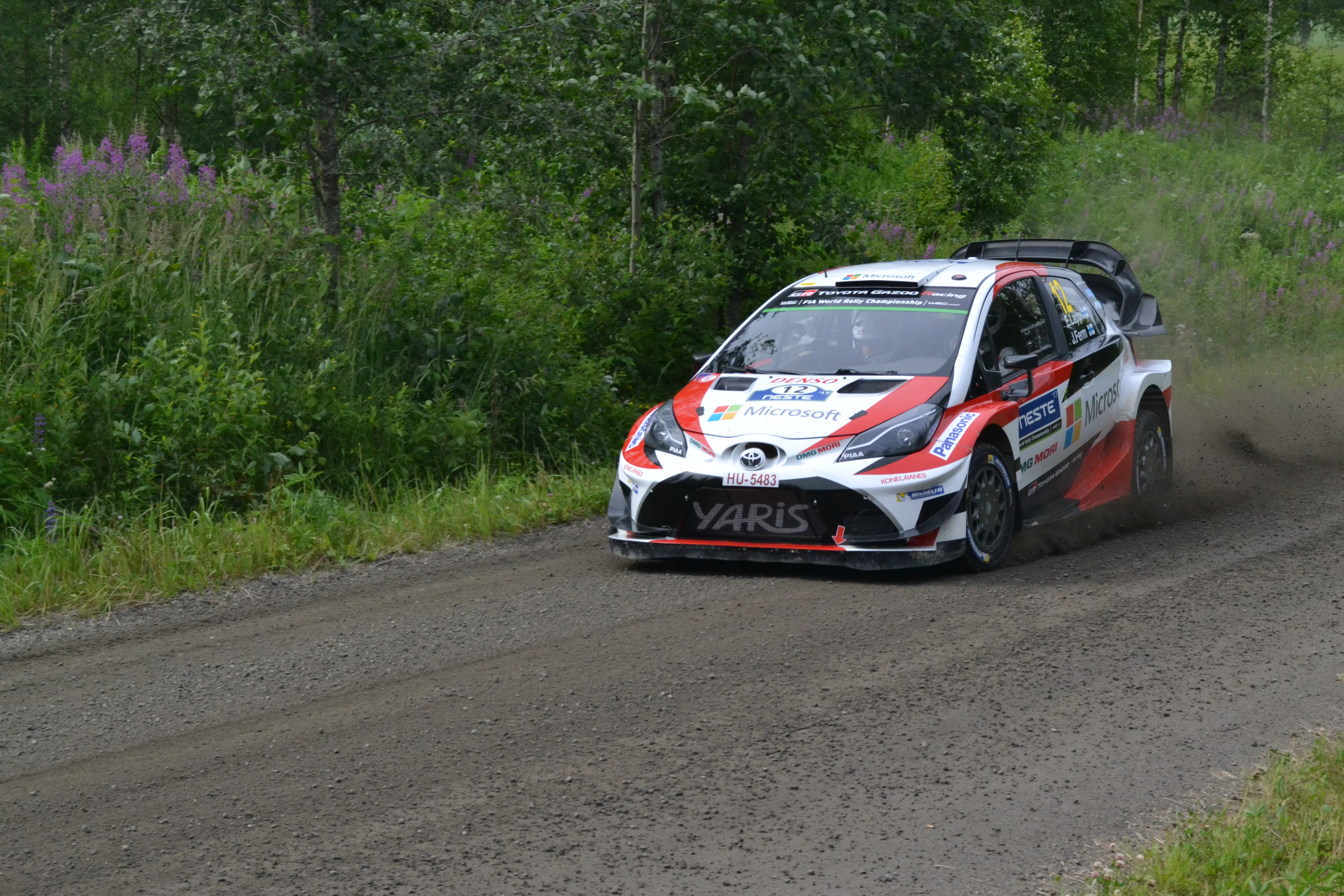
Esapekka Lappi on the way to victory in the 2017 Rally Finland

Toyota made their return to the WRC after eighteen years of absence in 2017 season with Toyota Yaris WRC.

Following the withdrawal of Volkswagen Motorsport from the sport, Jari-Matti Latvala and co-driver Miikka Anttila joined Toyota Gazoo Racing, where they were team-mates with Juho Hänninen, who returned to the championship for the first time since 2014, and his co-driver Kaj Lindström. Reigning WRC2 champions Esapekka Lappi and Janne Ferm made their début in a WRC specification car, contesting a partial campaign from the Rally of Portugal.

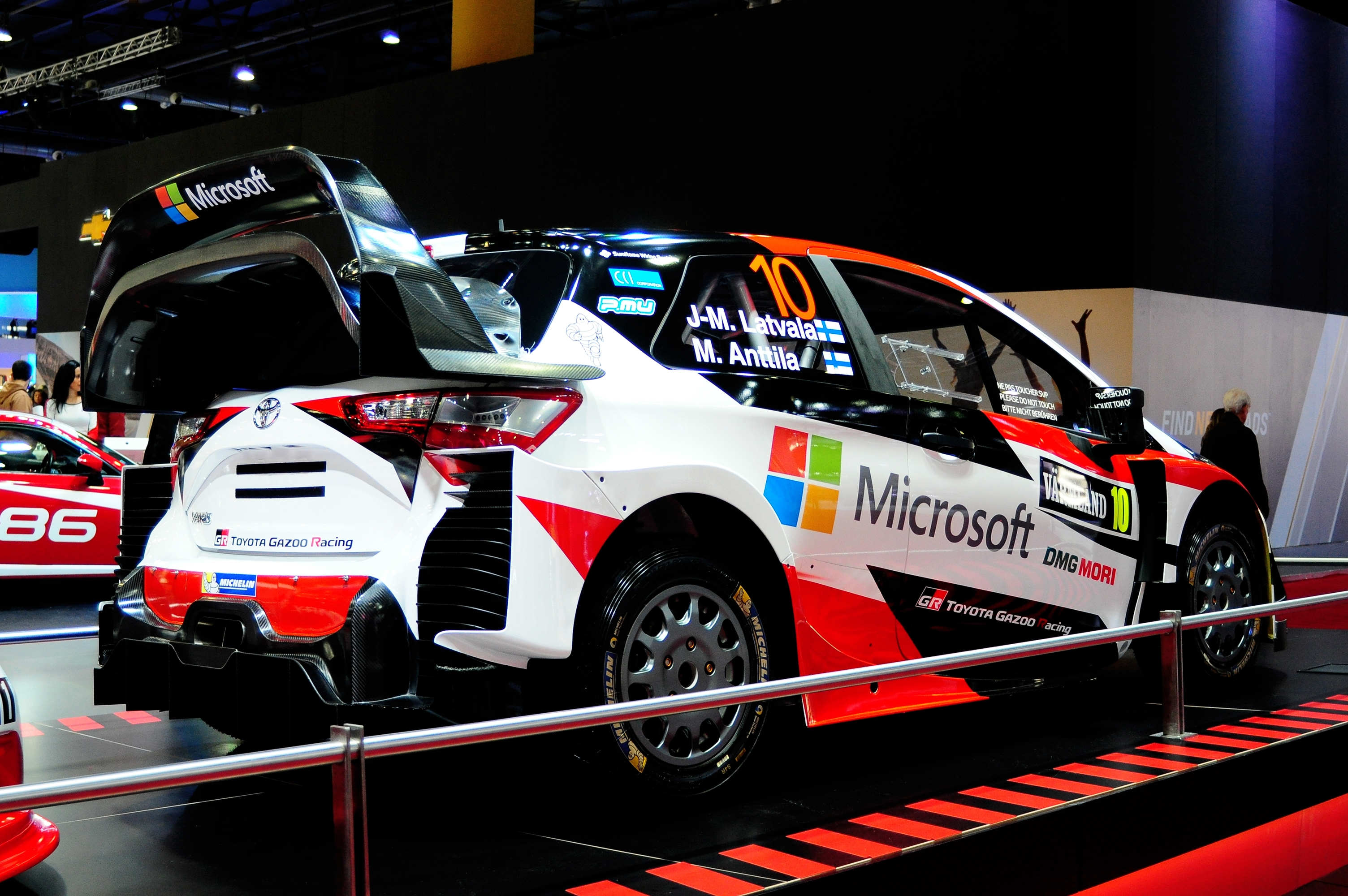
Toyota Yaris WRC - Jari-Matti Latvala - Buenos Aires Motorshow 2017

The team took their first podium at the Monte Carlo Rally, and took their first win at the next round in Rally Sweden. The team's best result of the season came in Finland, with Lappi taking his first WRC win, Hänninen his first podium finish, although Latvala had to retire from the lead with a mechanical problem.

The team finished the season third in the manufacturers' championship.

=== 2018 ===
Ahead of the 2018 season, Ott Tänak and Martin Järveoja left M-Sport to join the team, replacing the crew of Hänninen and Lindström who took new positions within the team. Hänninen remained in a test driver role and Lindström replaced Jarmo Lehtinen as the team's sporting director.

In August, the team relocated its service base to a new facility in Estonia, located 8 km from the capital of Tallinn. Headquarters, development, testing and administration remained in Finland.

Toyota Gazoo Racing WRT won the 2018 World Rally Championship manufacturers title. With Tommi Mäkinen heading the team, he became the first person in the history of the championship to win both as a driver and as a team principal. Tänak took four rally wins, including three consecutively. Jari-Matti Latvala won once.

=== 2019 ===
In 2019, Esapekka Lappi and Janne Ferm left to join Citroën after two years with the team. Kris Meeke and Sebastian Marshall were recruited to drive a third car in the championship. Tänak and Järveoja won the driver's and co-driver's championships, although Toyota would finish runners-up to Hyundai in the manufacturers' championship.

=== 2020 ===
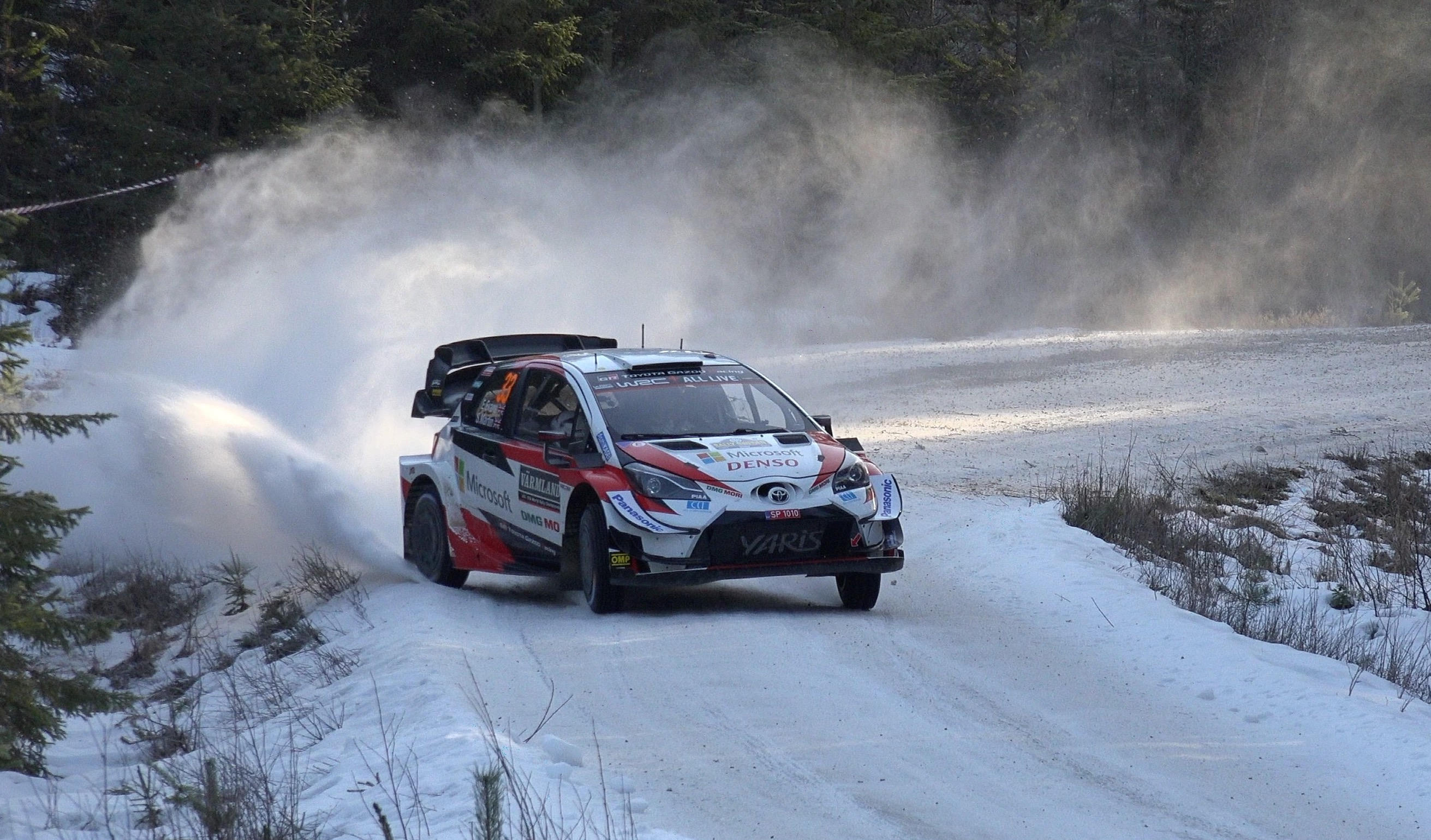
Elfyn Evans on the way to victory in the 2020 Rally Sweden

In the 2020 season, Toyota had a brand new line up with six-time WRC champion Sébastien Ogier joining from Citroën who had pulled out of the 2020 season with Elfyn Evans from M-Sport and Kalle Rovanperä from Škoda Motorsport all joining Toyota for this season, as 2019 champion Ott Tänak left to join Hyundai, and Kris Meeke left the team as well.

The COVID-19 coronavirus pandemic temporarily halted the 2020 WRC season; in the end, seven rounds were completed, with Sébastien Ogier and Julien Ingrassia emerging victorious. They had intended to retire at the season's end; however, in November 2020 it was announced that the pair would continue competing for one more year. Toyota once again finished as runners-up to Hyundai in the manufacturers' standings.

In September, Toyota Gazoo Racing completed the purchase of the team and operational assets from Tommi Mäkinen Racing. Mäkinen himself stepped down from the team principal role and became a motorsports advisor to the Toyota Motor Corporation.

=== 2021 ===
Ogier, Rovanperä and Evans were retained for the 2021 season. Development driver Takamoto Katsuta also completed his first full season with the team, notching his first WRC podium with 2nd place in Safari Rally Kenya. Former driver Jari-Matti Latvala assumed the role of team principal following Mäkinen's departure.

Sébastien Ogier and Julien Ingrassia won their 8th respective drivers' and co-drivers' world titles following victory at the season-ending Rally Monza. The pair subsequently retired from full-time rallying, having deferred their decision to do so after the truncated 2020 season. With 9 victories from 12 events, Toyota Gazoo Racing also took home the manufacturers' title, completing their first championship double since their return to the sport.

The facility in Estonia closed at the end of the 2021 season, with team operations being run from one base in Jyväskylä, Finland.

=== 2022 ===
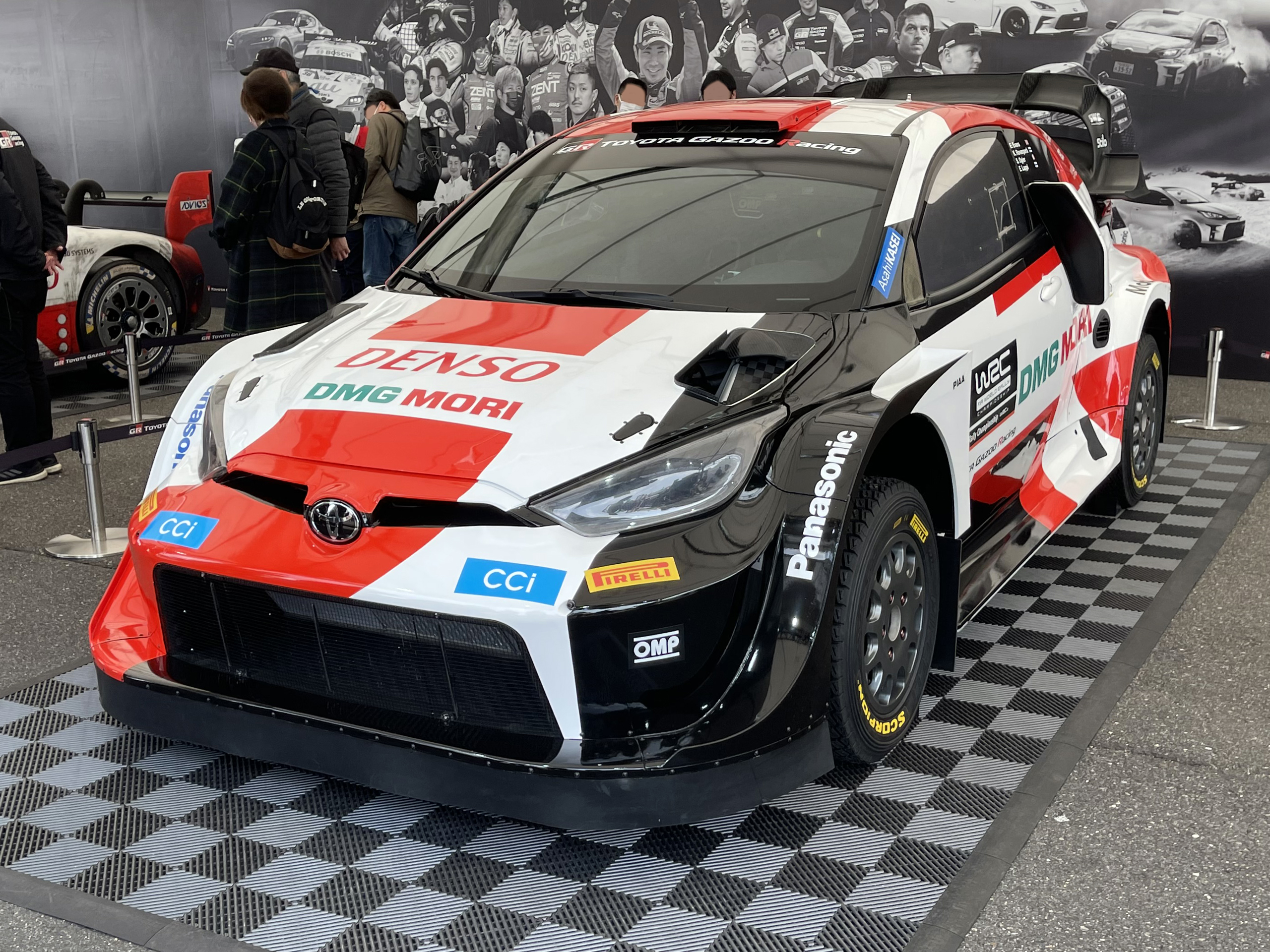
Toyota GR Yaris in 2022

New technical regulations were introduced for the 2022 season, mandating the use of a hybrid system and a move to a tubular spaceframe chassis. The Toyota GR Yaris Rally1 Hybrid therefore succeeded the Toyota Yaris WRC.

Esapekka Lappi made a return to Toyota full-time, following a one-off appearance at Rally Finland the previous year. Kalle Rovanperä, Elfyn Evans and Takamoto Katsuta all remained with the team; Katsuta, however, was registered for manufacturer points under the Toyota Gazoo Racing World Rally Team Next Generation entry, rather than the main team. Following his retirement from full-time rallying, reigning world champion Sébastien Ogier continued to make appearances for Toyota on a part-time basis, this time with Benjamin Veillas in the co-drivers' seat.

Kalle Rovanperä and Jonne Halttunen would go on to record six wins in 2022, culminating in their first World Drivers' and Co-Drivers' Championships. Having become the youngest winner of a WRC round in 2021, Rovanperä also became the youngest world champion to date, doing so a day after his 22nd birthday and eclipsing Colin McRae's previous record by almost five years.

Strong results elsewhere enabled Toyota Gazoo Racing to successfully defend their Manufacturers' title. They recorded a 1-2-3-4 finish at Safari Rally Kenya, becoming the first team to do so on a WRC round since Citroen Total WRT achieved the same result at 2010 Rally Bulgaria.

=== 2023 ===
Ogier continued racing for the team part-time in 2023, albeit alongside Vincent Landais instead of Benjamin Veillas. Following Esapekka Lappi's switch to Hyundai, Takamoto Katsuta was promoted to score manufacturer's points on rounds where Ogier did not compete. Team principal Jari-Matti Latvala also made a one-off return to the WRC during Rally Finland, recording a fifth-place finish.

At the season-opening Rallye Monte Carlo, Ogier took the outright record for wins on the event from Sebastien Loeb. It also marked the first WRC victory for co-driver Landais. By the end of the season, Toyota had secured their third consecutive Manufacturers' World Championship, scoring podiums on all but one of the season's 13 rallies. Kalle Rovanperä and Jonne Halttunen also successfully defended their World Drivers' Champion titles.

After the season's conclusion, Rovanperä announced his intention to compete part-time in 2024, with a return to Toyota's team full-time planned for 2025.

=== 2024 ===
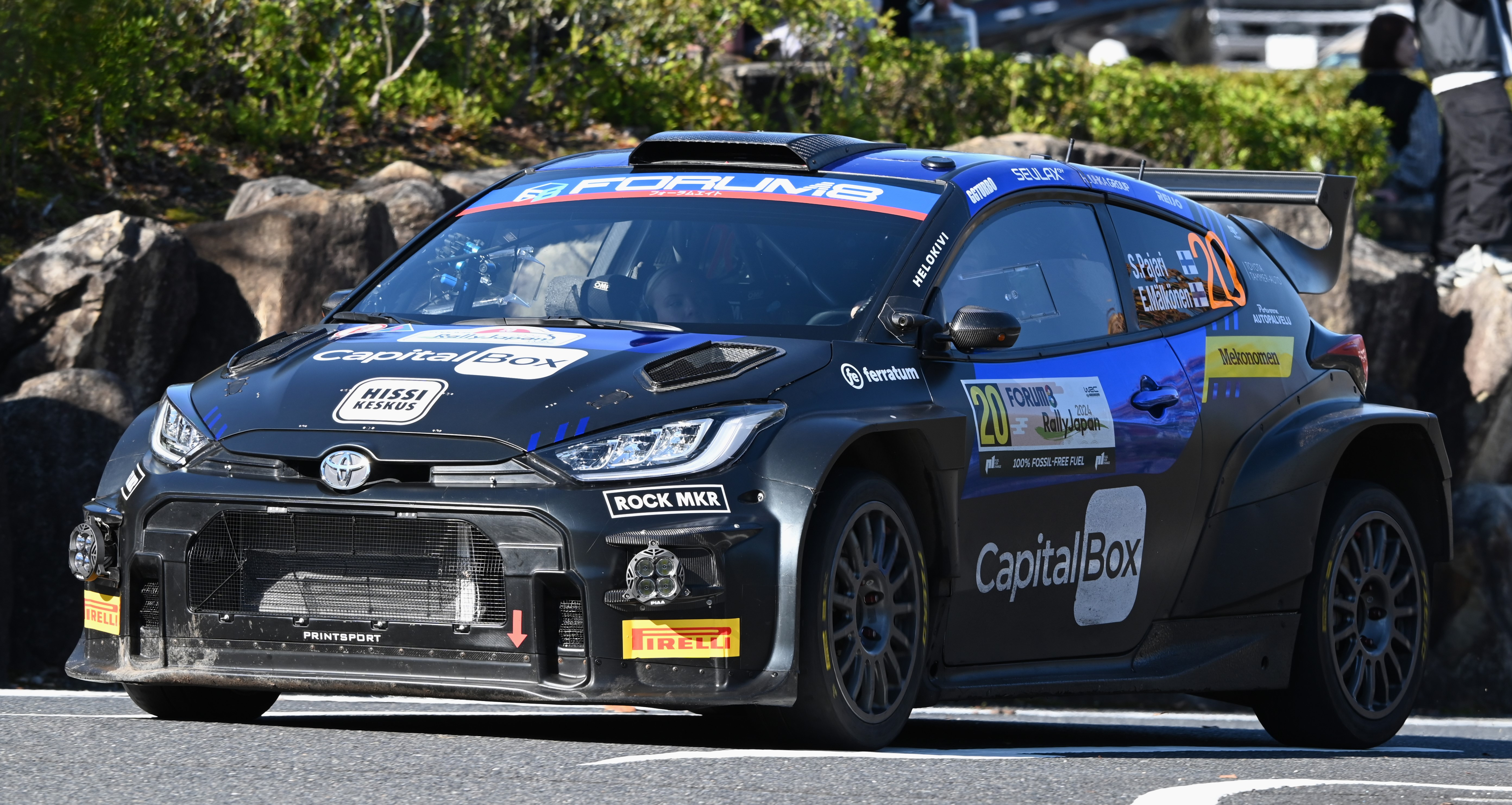
Sami Pajari and Enni Mälkonen driving their GR Yaris Rally2 during 2024 Rally Japan

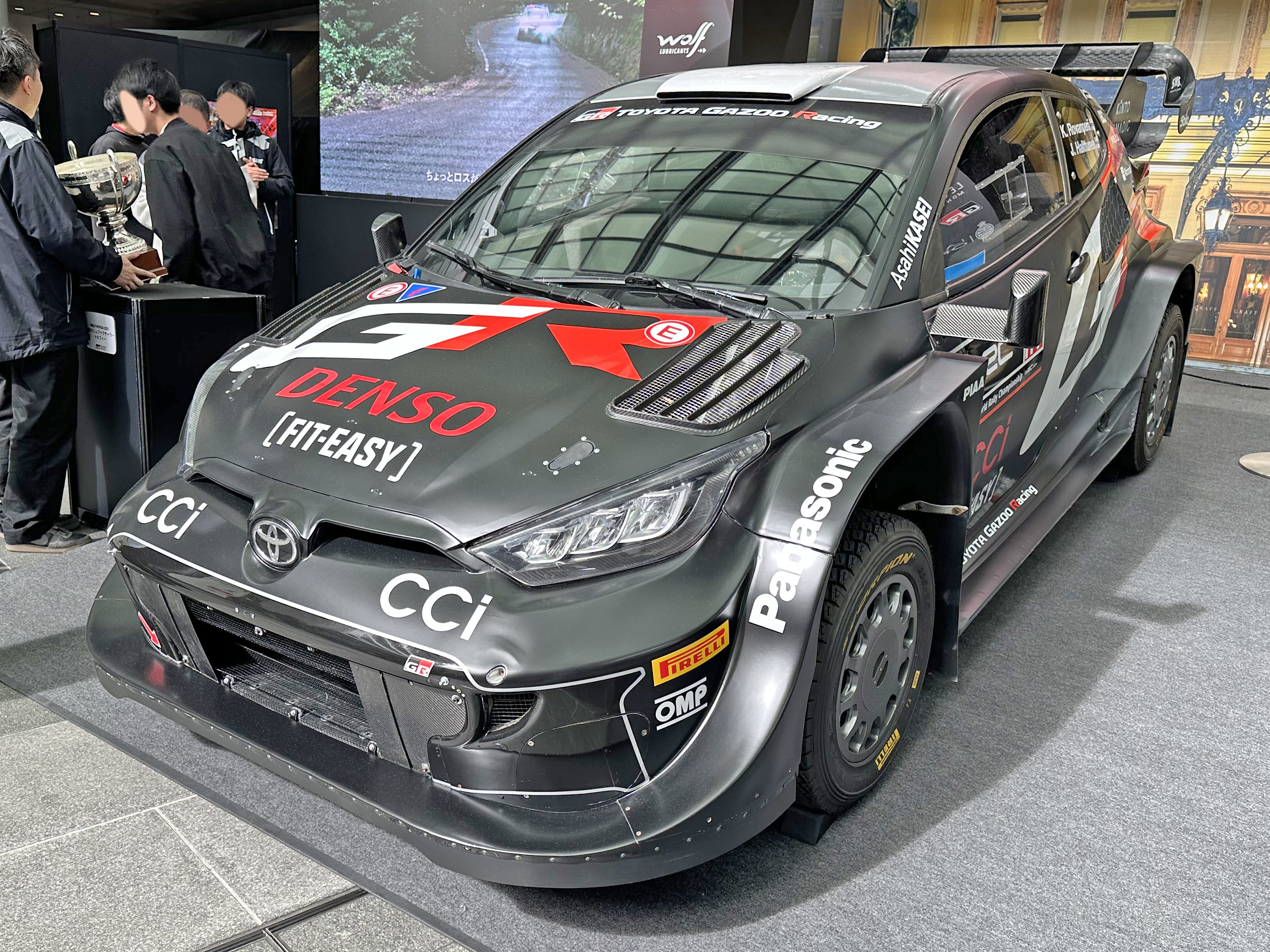
Toyota GR Yaris hybrid in 2024

Toyota's driver line-up remained familiar throughout 2024. Elfyn Evans and Takamoto Katsuta contested a full season, with Rovanperä and Ogier on part-time programmes, although the latter would eventually compete in all but three of the season's rallies. WRC2 crew Sami Pajari and Enni Mälkonen also drove the top-line cars on three events; at their home event in Finland, they recorded their first WRC stage win and a career-best 4th place overall finish.

Although Toyota ceded the driver's title to Hyundai's Thierry Neuville, the Japanese marque eventually secured the Manfuacturers' Championship by just three points at the season-ending Rally Japan. 2024 also marked the debut of the Toyota GR Yaris Rally2, a car developed to Rally2 regulations at the team's headquarters in Finland. Jan Solans secured its (and his) maiden WRC2 victory in Portugal, while Pajari and Mälkonen drove the car on the way to the WRC2 Drivers' Championship title.

=== 2025 ===
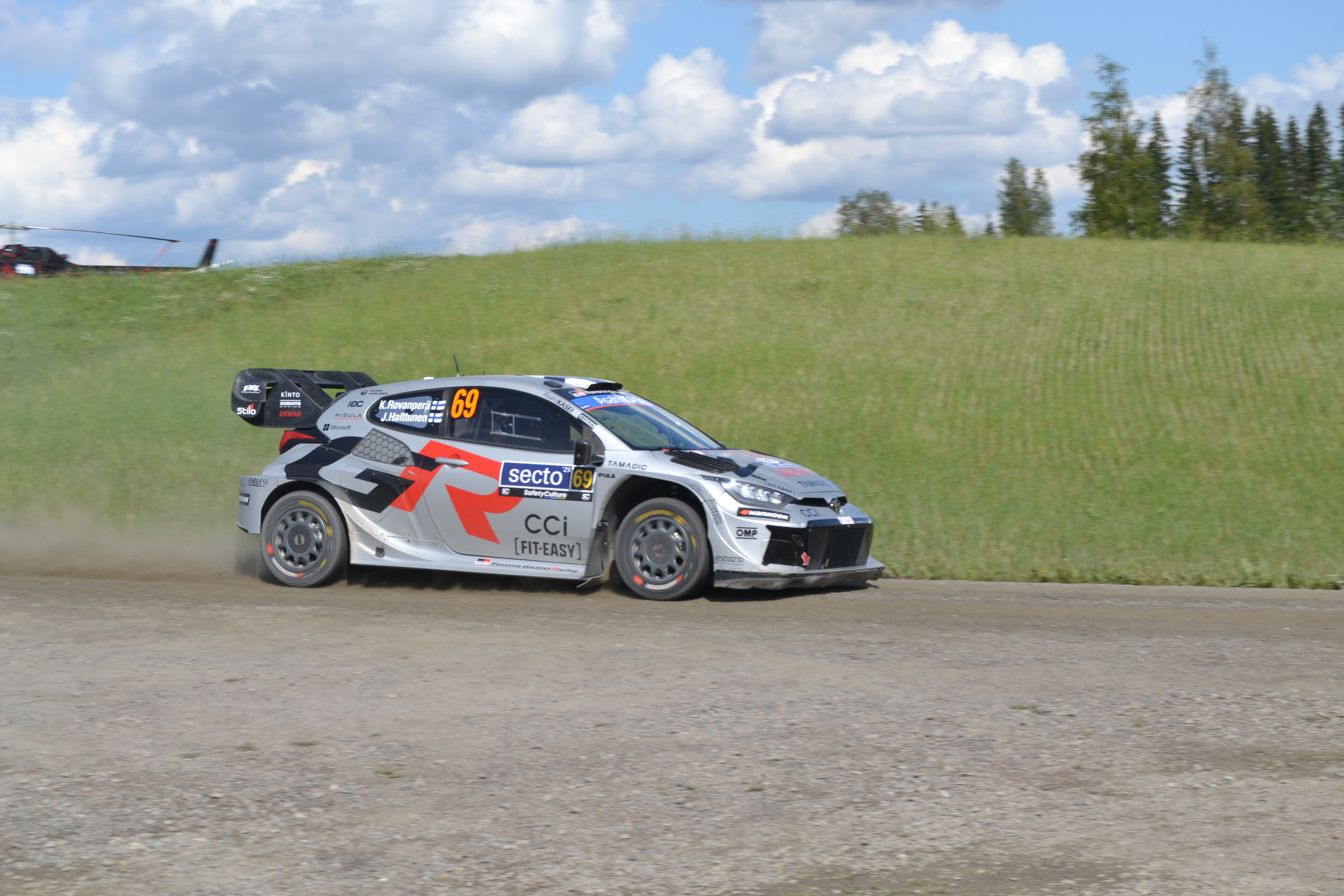
Kalle Rovanperä and Jonne Halttunen won 2025 Rally Finland for the first time in their careers.

Rovanperä returned to full-time competition in 2025, taking his place alongside full-time competitors Elfyn Evans and Takamoto Katsuta, and part-timer Sébastien Ogier. WRC2 champion Sami Pajari was promoted to a full season in a Rally1 car, electing to partner with Marko Salminen. As with Katsuta in 2022, the pair are scoring points for a separate entity in the Manufacturers' Championship, this time titled Toyota Gazoo Racing WRT2.

With Jari-Matti Latvala competing in the European Historic Rally Championship, Juha Kankkunen was appointed Deputy Team Principal as cover for his countryman when required.

== Driver development program ==
The TGR WRC Challenge Program (TGR-DC) was first established in 2015 to identify and nurture talented young Japanese drivers with the potential to rise up to the WRC. The first two to join the program were drivers Hiroki Arai and Takamoto Katsuta. Co-driver Sayaka Adachi was added to the program in 2017.

The WRC Challenge Program was renewed in 2022, when three drivers – Hikaru Kogure, Nao Otake and Yuki Yamamoto – joined the program. The third generation was started in 2024, with Shotaro Goto and Takumi Matsushita being added to the roster. Kogure and Yamamoto currently compete with Toyota GR Yaris Rally2s, while Goto and Matsushita drive Renault Clio Rally4s in Finnish and European events. The program is run from the team's headquarters in Jyväskylä. Trainers for the program include Finnish former rally drivers Jouni Ampuja, Mikko Hirvonen, and Juho Hänninen.

The WRC Challenge Program's first and only graduate is Takamoto Katsuta, who currently competes for Toyota's manufacturer team in the World Rally Championship.

=== Members ===
Current TGR-DC members
Driver	Years
(Japan) Yuki Yamamoto	2022–
(Japan) Shotaro Goto	2024–
(Japan) Takumi Matsushita	2024–
(Estonia) Jaspar Vaher	2025–
(Japan) Rio Ogata	2025–
(Japan) Kanta Yanaguida	2025–
(Japan) Tomiya Maekawa	2025–
(Japan) Hiroya Minowa	2026–

Former TGR-DC members
Member	Years
(Japan) Hiroki Arai	2015–2018
(Japan) Takamoto Katsuta	2015–2023
(Japan) Sayaka Adachi	2017–2018
(Japan) Nao Otake	2022–2023
(Japan) Hikaru Kogure	2022–2025
(New Zealand) Zeal Jones	2026
