= Renault Mégane =

Car model manufactured by Renault

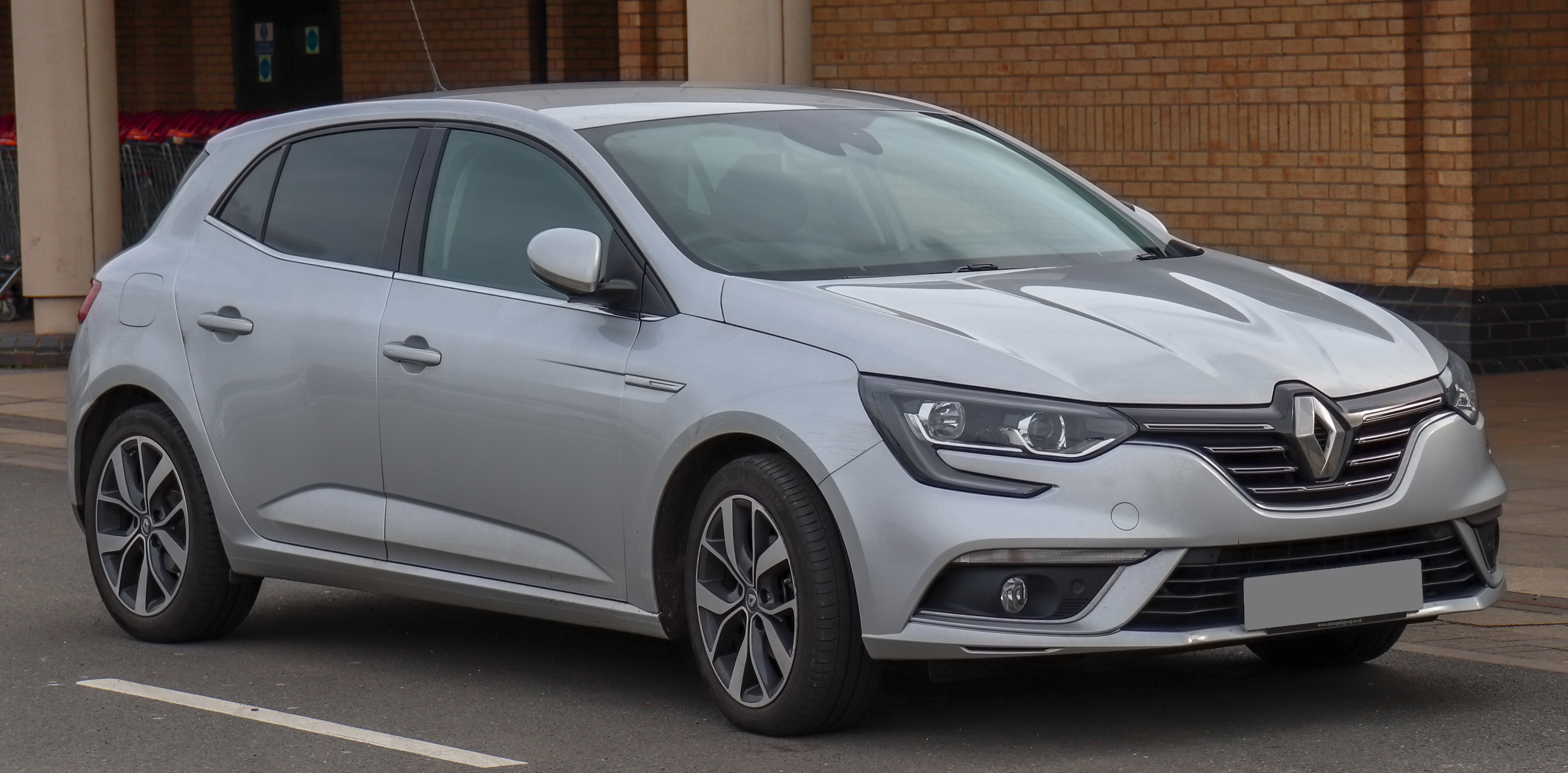

Overview
- Manufacturer: Renault
- Production: 1995–present

Body and chassis
- Class: Small family car (C)
- Body style: 3 or 5-door hatchback 4-door sedan/saloon 5-door estate 2-door coupé-cabriolet
- Layout: Front-engine, front-wheel-drive

Chronology
- Predecessor: Renault 19; Renault Fluence (for Mégane IV saloon)
- Successor: Renault Megane E-Tech Electric; Renault Fluence (for Mégane II saloon)

The Renault Mégane (French pronunciation: [meɡan]) (Note: Also spelled without the acute accent as Megane, especially in languages other than French, and also known as the Renault Megavan for an LCV in Ireland, as the Renault Scala in Iran and as the Renault Mégane Grandcoupé for the saloon in Israel, Palestinian Authority and Serbia for certain generations.) is a small family car produced by the French car manufacturer Renault since 1995, and was the successor to the Renault 19. The Mégane has been offered in three- and five-door hatchback, saloon, coupé, convertible and estate bodystyles at various points in its lifetime, and having been through four generations is now in its fifth incarnation.

The first generation was largely based on its predecessor, the 19, and utilized modified versions of that car's drivetrain and chassis. The second and third generations were based on the Renault–Nissan C platform. The fourth generation is based on the CMF-CD platform, as used by the Renault Talisman and Renault Scénic.

In November 1996, the Mégane Scénic compact MPV was introduced, using the same mechanical components as the hatchback Mégane. For 2002, the Mégane entered its second generation with a substantial redesign taking place, and was voted European Car of the Year for 2003, whilst also becoming the first car in its class to receive a five star Euro NCAP rating.

The Mégane entered its third generation in 2008, with another totally different design being used; the saloon version of the Mégane became known as the Renault Fluence for this generation, and it was introduced in 2009. The fourth-generation Mégane was launched in 2015, with sales commencing in 2016.

In 2021, Renault revealed a battery electric version known as the Megane E-Tech Electric, which takes on a crossover exterior design.

== First generation (X64; 1995) ==
Mégane I
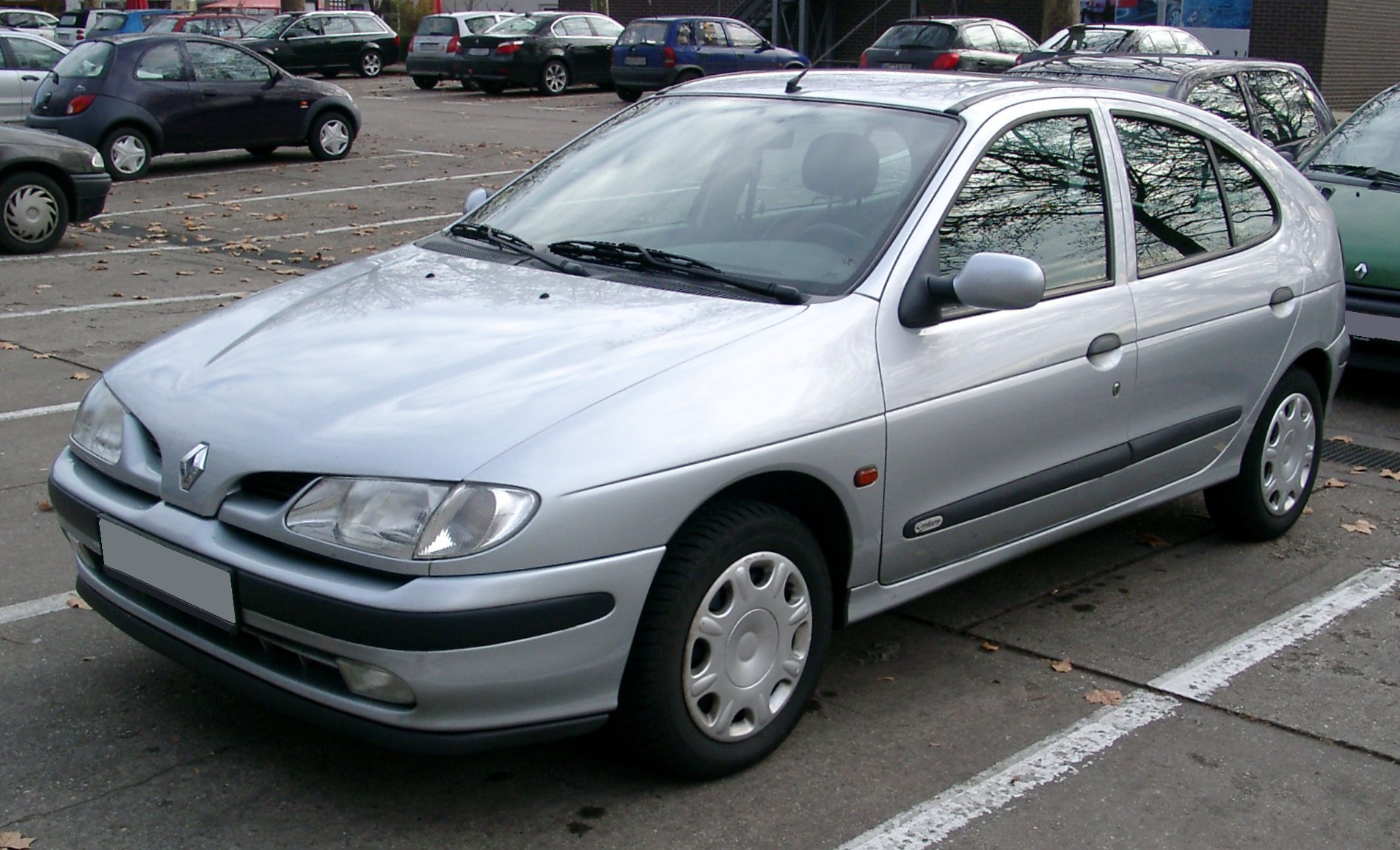

Overview
- Also called: Renault Megavan (LCV, Ireland)
- Production: July 1995–2003; 1995–2009 (Argentina); 2000–2009 (Colombia)
- Model years: 1995–2003
- Assembly: Turkey: Nilüfer, Bursa Province (Oyak-Renault, sedan and station wagon models only); France: Douai (Douai Factory, hatchback models only); Spain: Palencia (Renault Spain); Germany: Osnabruck (Karmann, coupe and cabriolet models only); Belgium: Haren-Vilvoorde (RIB); Russia: Moscow (Avtoframos, Asia models only); Argentina: Santa Isabel, Argentina (Renault Argentina, South America models only); Colombia: Envigado (Sofasa)
- Designer: Michel Jardin (1991); Patrick Le Quément (1991, 1992)

Body and chassis
- Body style: 4-door saloon 2-door coupé 5-door hatchback 2-door convertible 5-door estate
- Related: Renault Scénic; Renault 19

Powertrain
- Engine: Single overhead camshaft petrol: 1.4 L E7J I4 8v; 1.6 L K7M I4 8v; 2.0 L F3R I4 8v; Dual overhead camshaft petrol: 1.4 L K4J I4 16v; 1.6 L K4M I4 16v; 2.0 L F5R IDE I4 16v; 2.0 L F7R I4 16v; Single overhead camshaft diesel: 1.9 L F8Q d I4 8v; 1.9 L F8Q dT I4 8v; 1.9 L F9Q dTi I4 8v; 1.9 L F9Q dCi I4 8v
- Transmission: 4-speed automatic 5-speed manual

Dimensions
- Wheelbase: Hatchback, Sedan & Wagon: 2,580 mm (101.6 in); Coupé & Convertible: 2,468 mm (97.2 in)
- Length: Hatchback: 4,129–4,164 mm (162.6–163.9 in); Sedan: 4,436–4,400 mm (174.6–173.2 in); Wagon: 4,437 mm (174.7 in); Coupé: 3,931–3,967 mm (154.8–156.2 in); Convertible: 4,081 mm (160.7 in)
- Width: 1,698–1,699 mm (66.9–66.9 in)
- Height: 1,365–1,420 mm (53.7–55.9 in)

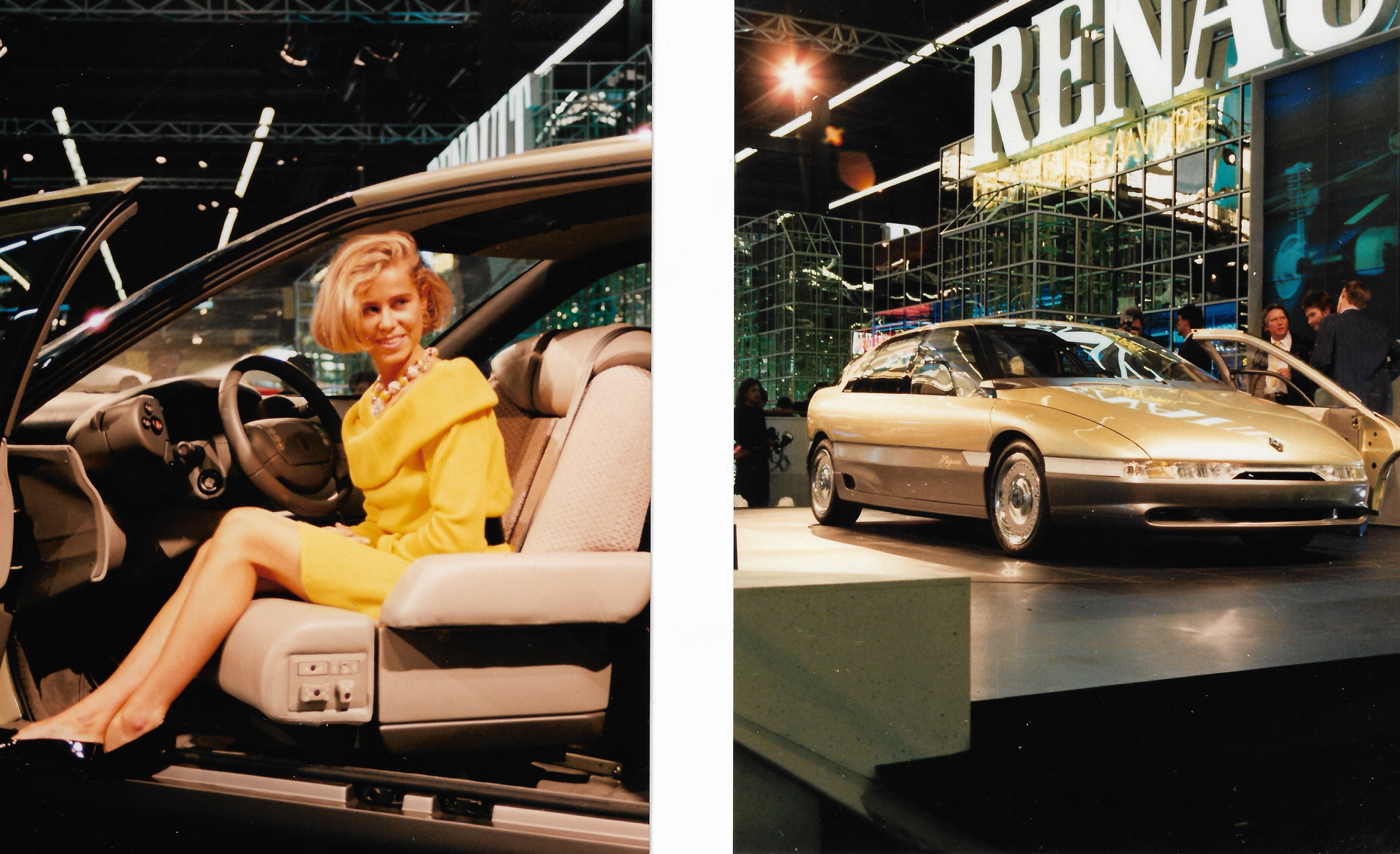
Mégane concept, 1988

Development of the X64 began at the beginning of 1990, with the first sketches of X64 programme being drawn during the first six months of 1990. Very quickly, several themes were outlined and developed into four small scale (1/5) models by September 1990. The Mégane name, meaning "eyeglasses" in Japanese, was coined by Manfred Gotta.

The designs retained were developed around four themes. Theme A: a six light version, evoking the Laguna; Theme B: a model with a markedly cuneiform line; Theme C: another design with ellipse-shaped glasswork and rear notch; Theme D: a model with the same elliptical glazing and rounded rear.

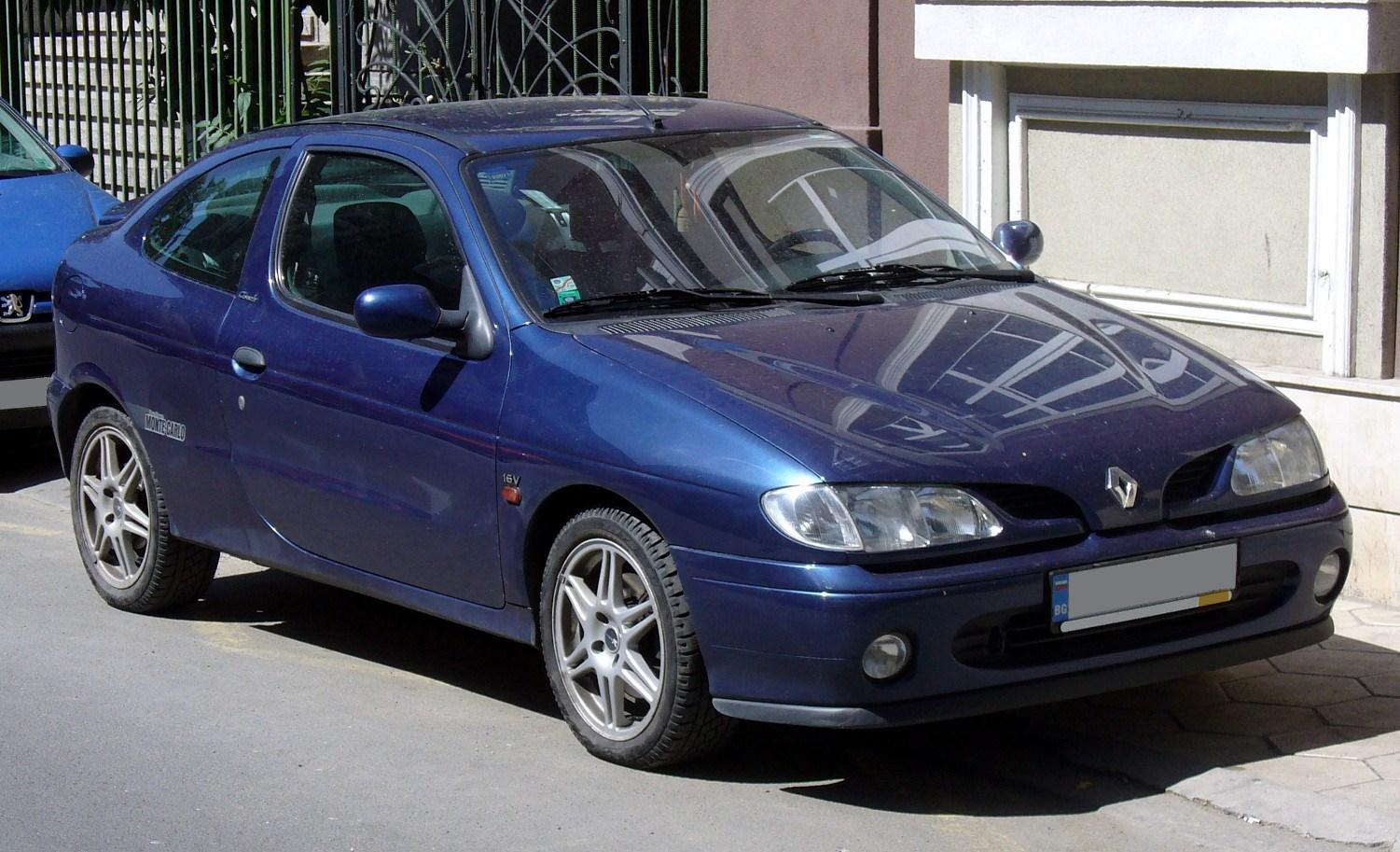
Renault Mégane Coupé 16V Monte Carlo (pre-facelift)

In March 1991, all four styling proposals were developed into full scale (1:1). Theme C by Michel Jardin was chosen by Le Quement and frozen for production in April 1992. The first prototypes were built and presented to management in December 1992. Approximately 432 prototypes were built (at Rueil assembly) and destroyed during development.

In June 1993, Renault purchased production tooling for the X64, with the first test unit being assembled at the Douai plant in October 1994, and pre production units being constructed from December 1994 to the middle of 1995.

The Mégane I was unveiled in September 1995, at the Frankfurt Motor Show, as a replacement for the Renault 19. The car was essentially a reskin of its predecessor, and carried over the 19's floorpan, engines, transmissions and chassis design, albeit with much modification.

Taking its name from a Renault concept car shown in 1988, the Mégane further developed the new corporate styling theme introduced by Patrick Le Quément on the Laguna, most notably the "bird beak" front grille – a styling cue borrowed from the Renault 16 of the 1960s. Renault decided to add an acute accent to the vehicle name (Mégane), in order to assert its European identity, in a context of growing competition of newer car manufacturers coming from Japan.

As with the 19 and the 11 before it, the Mégane was produced at Renault's Douai plant in northern France starting in July 1995, and at the Spanish plant of Palencia. Market launch began on 15 November 1995 in France, and 15 December 1995 for the coupé. Sales in the United Kingdom commenced in April 1996.

Safety was a key focus of the Mégane I, Renault's first car reflecting their new focus of selling on safety.

It featured a pillar mounted three-point seatbelt for the middle rear occupant (replacing the common 'lap strap'), standard front belt pre tensioners and load limiters, driver's airbag (passenger airbag from 1996) and an impressive safety structure – a specification ahead of all rivals in 1995, e.g. VW Golf Mk 3, Opel Astra F, Ford Escort etc. Some features, such as the three-point middle belt, had debuted on the Renault 19 safety concept vehicle (and this feature entered production on the Renault Laguna before the Mégane).

The car also benefited from Renault's first "System for Restraint and Protection" (SRP), essentially a system of careful optimisation of occupant restraint by interaction of the seat, seatbelt, pretensioner, load limiter and airbag. The Mégane I achieved a best in class four star crash test rating in the 1998 round of testing by Euro NCAP.

November 1996 saw the introduction of the Mégane Scénic compact MPV.

Power came from the Renault E type ("Energy") engine in 1.4 L and 1.6 L, and the F-type unit in both 1.9 L diesel and 2.0 L petrol forms, although this time around there was a wider variety of 16 valve derivatives. A 1.9 L diesel engine in both normally aspirated and turbocharged forms was also available.

Renault also produced a limited number of Renaultsport edition Phase 1's with the Renaultsport bodywork; however, these were very rare. The Renaultsport kit was available to purchase for a short time direct from Renault France, but has now been discontinued, thus their value has increased.

The estate version of the original Mégane was only available in LHD form, with no RHD variants built. This could be due to the greater popularity of the Scenic in those markets, limiting the potential sales of a compact estate. The estate was added with the facelift of 1999, although pre-facelifted Mégane estates were sold from September 1998 in Turkey, where it was manufactured by Oyak-Renault.

In Japan, Renault was formerly licensed by Yanase Co., Ltd., but in 1999 Renault acquired a stake in Japanese automaker Nissan. As a result of Renault's purchase, Yanase canceled its licensing contract for all Renault models sold in Japan, including, but not limited to, the Mégane I, in 2000, and Nissan took over as the sole licensee for Renault cars.

=== Facelift ===
A mild facelift in spring 1999 gave the Mégane I a modified grille, more advanced safety features and upgraded equipment, and 16 valve engines were used across the range. An estate body style was also launched in mainland Europe with the facelift. The production continued for the Latin America market, where it was sold alongside the Mégane II line at a considerably lower price until 2011.

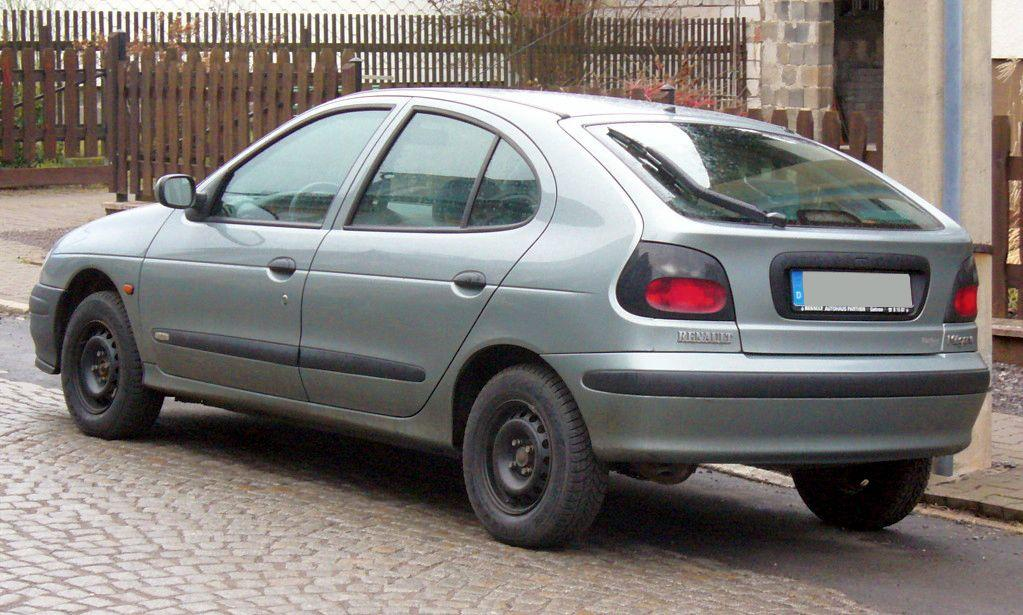
Pre-facelift Renault Mégane five-door

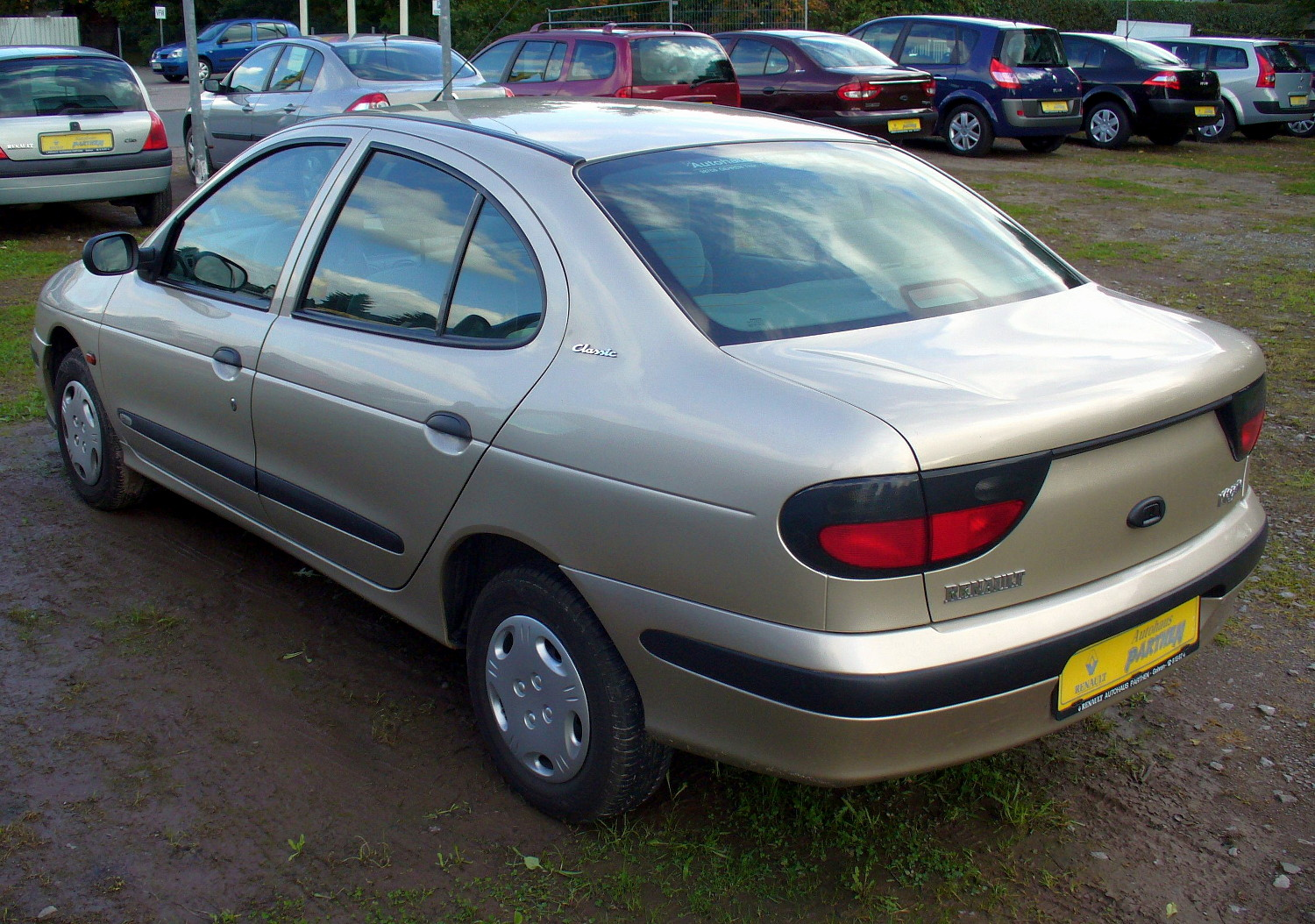
Pre-facelift Renault Mégane Classic sedan

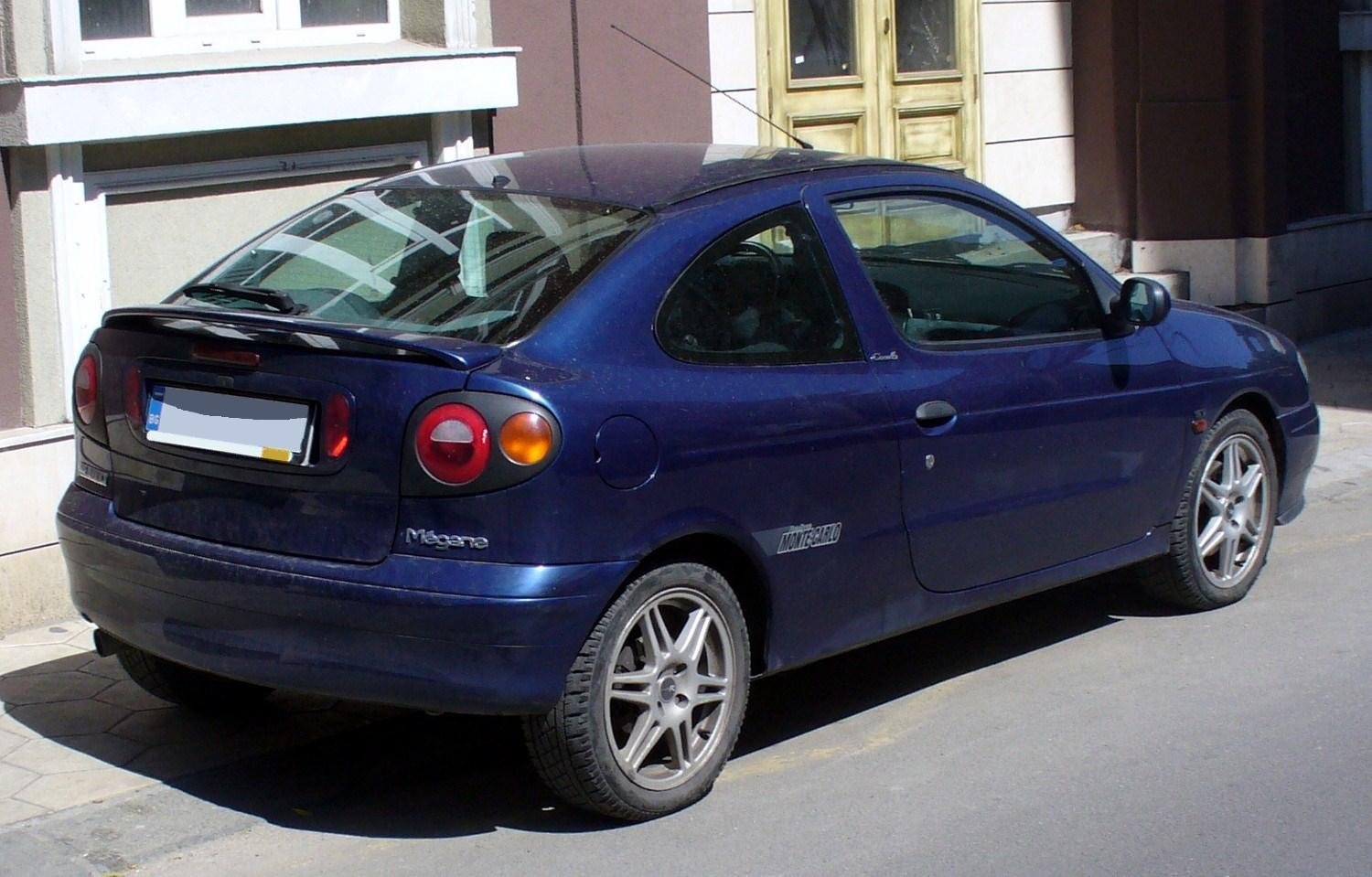
Pre-facelift Renault Mégane Coupé

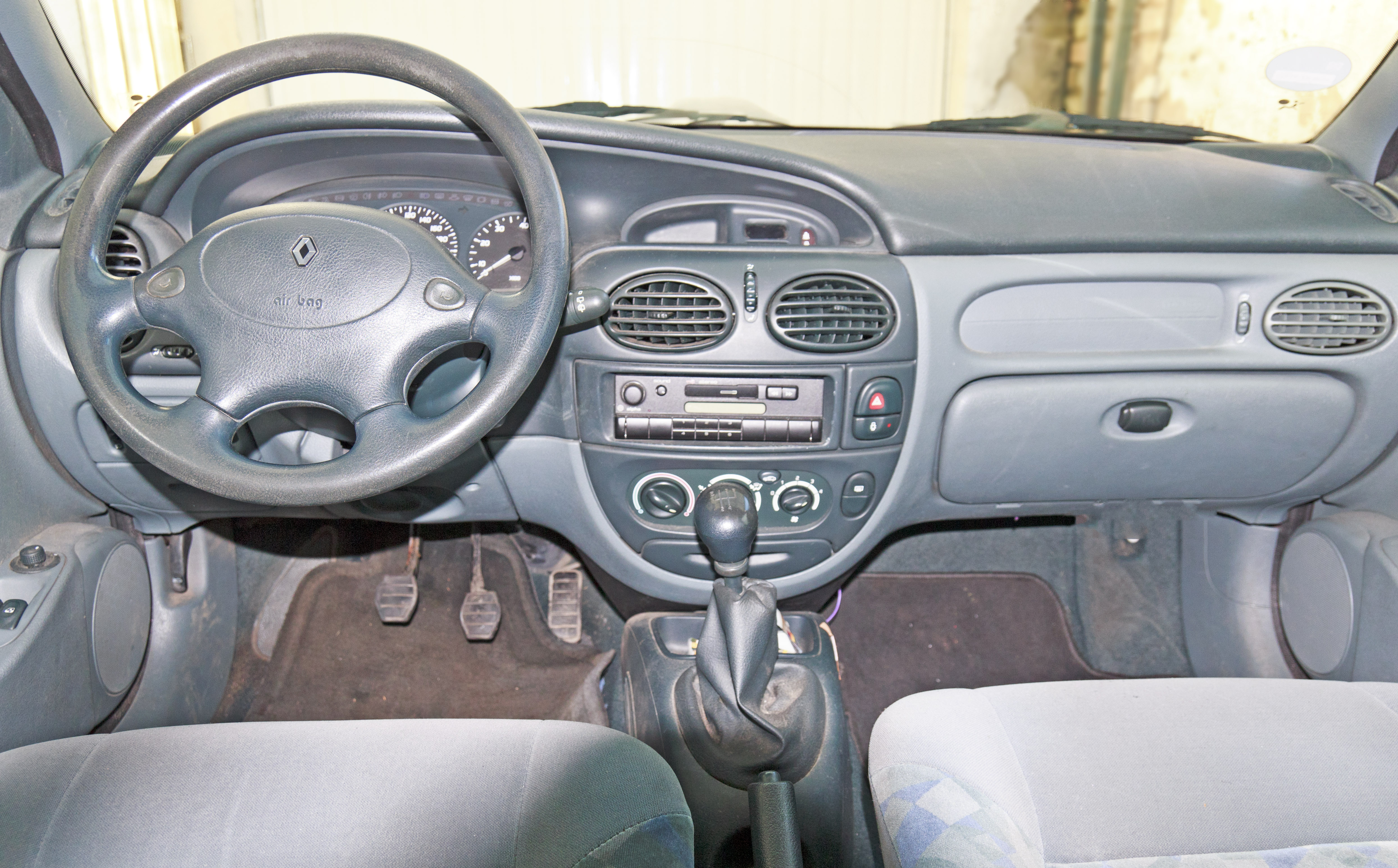
Pre-facelift interior

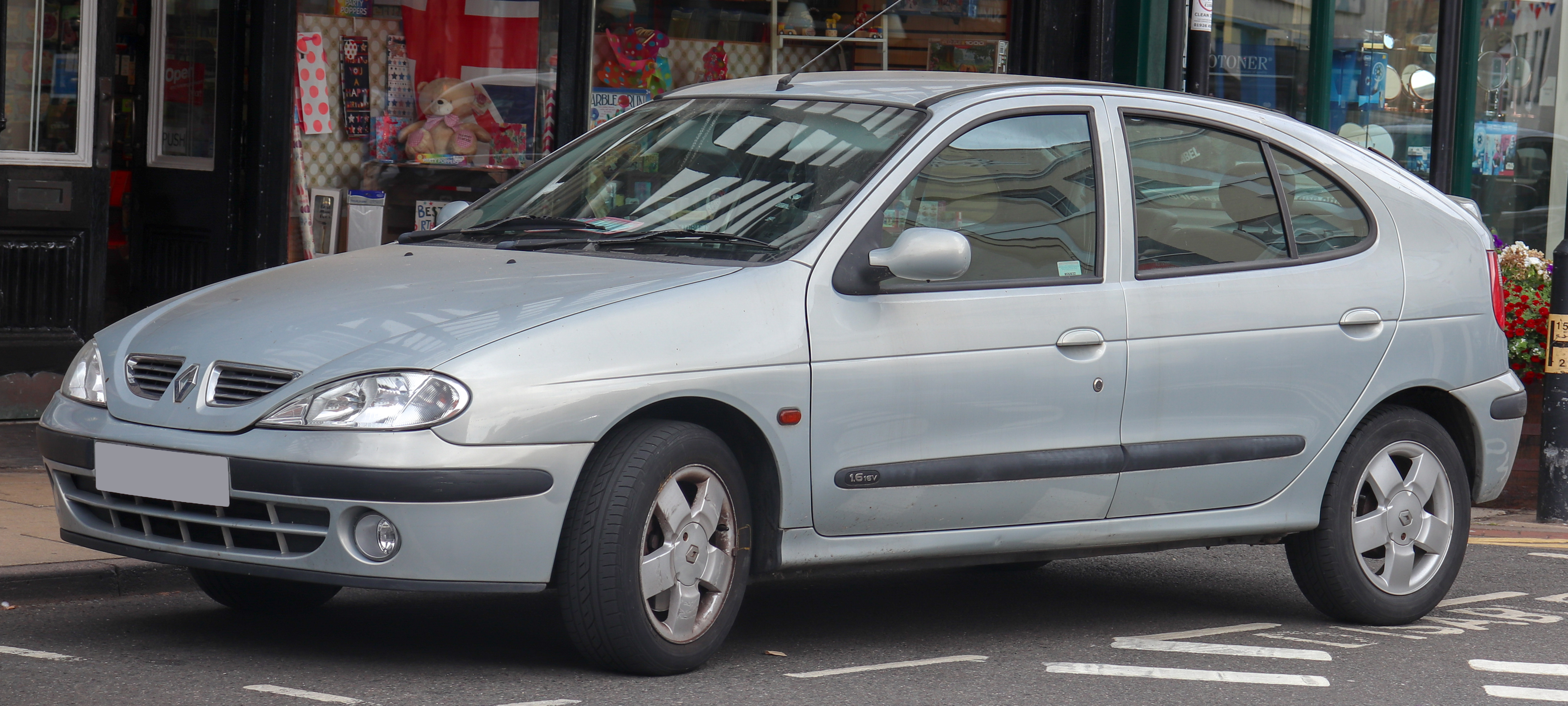
Post-facelift Renault Mégane five-door (hatchback)

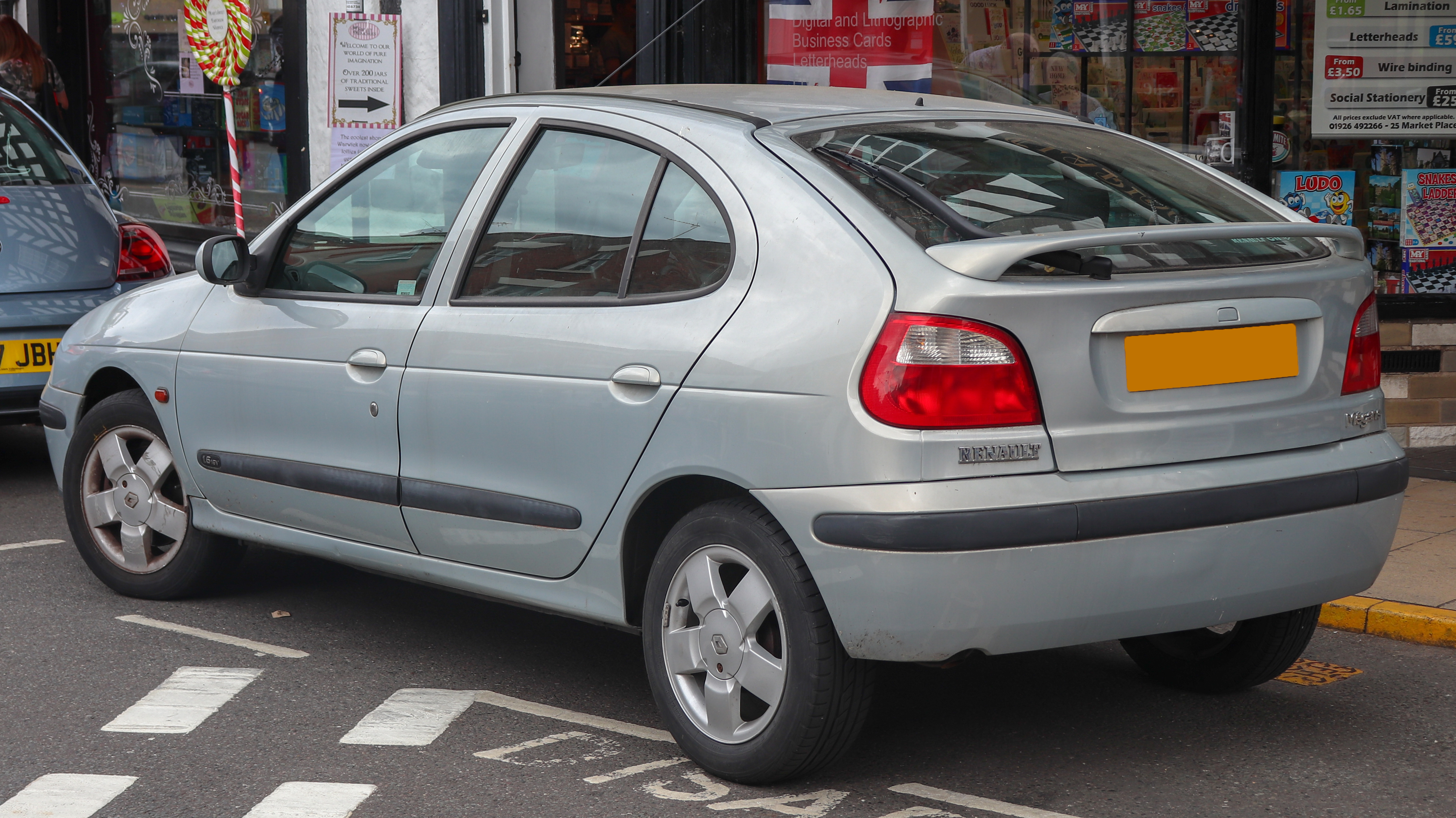
Post-facelift Renault Mégane five-door (hatchback)

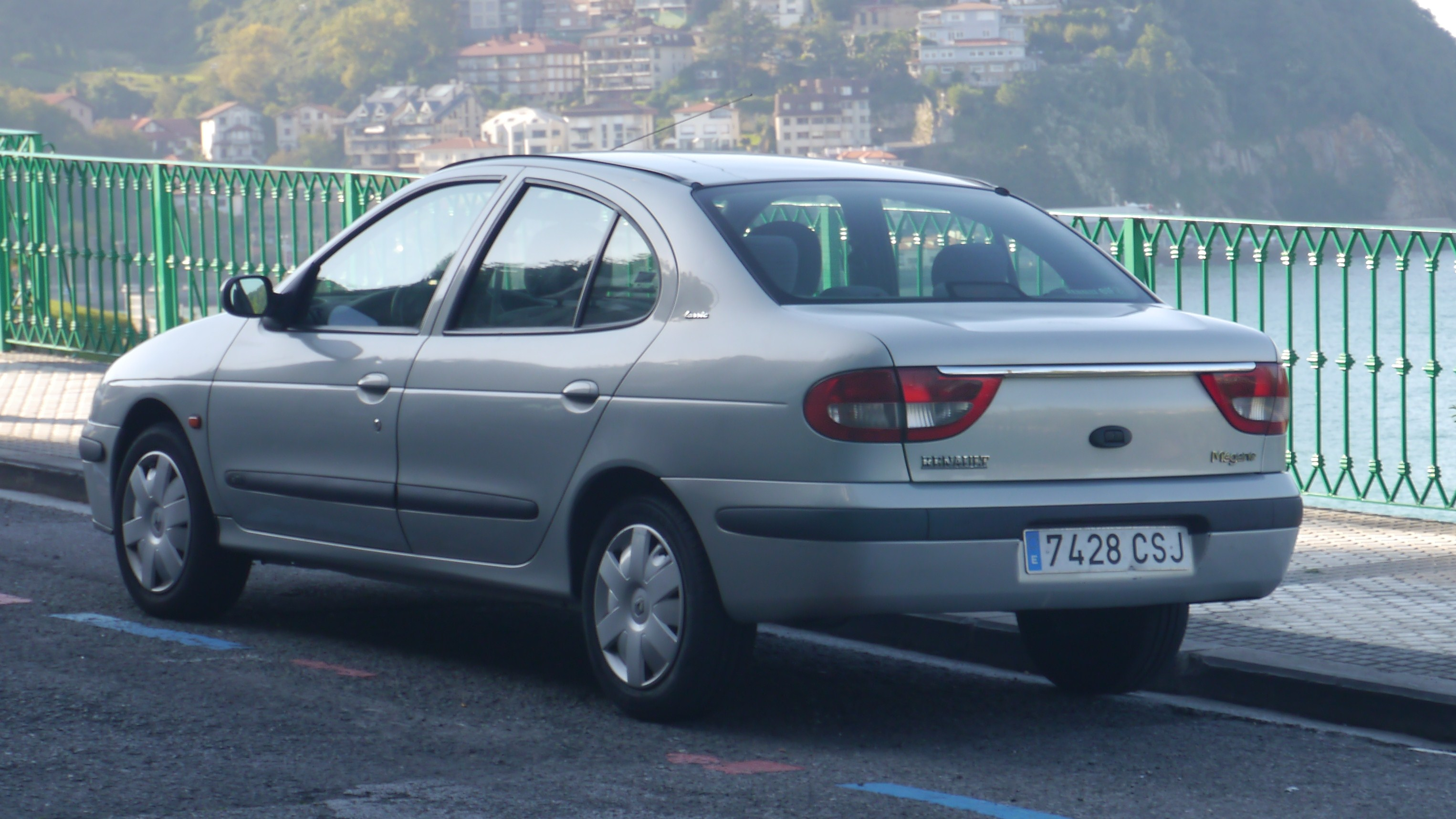
Post-facelift Renault Mégane Classic sedan

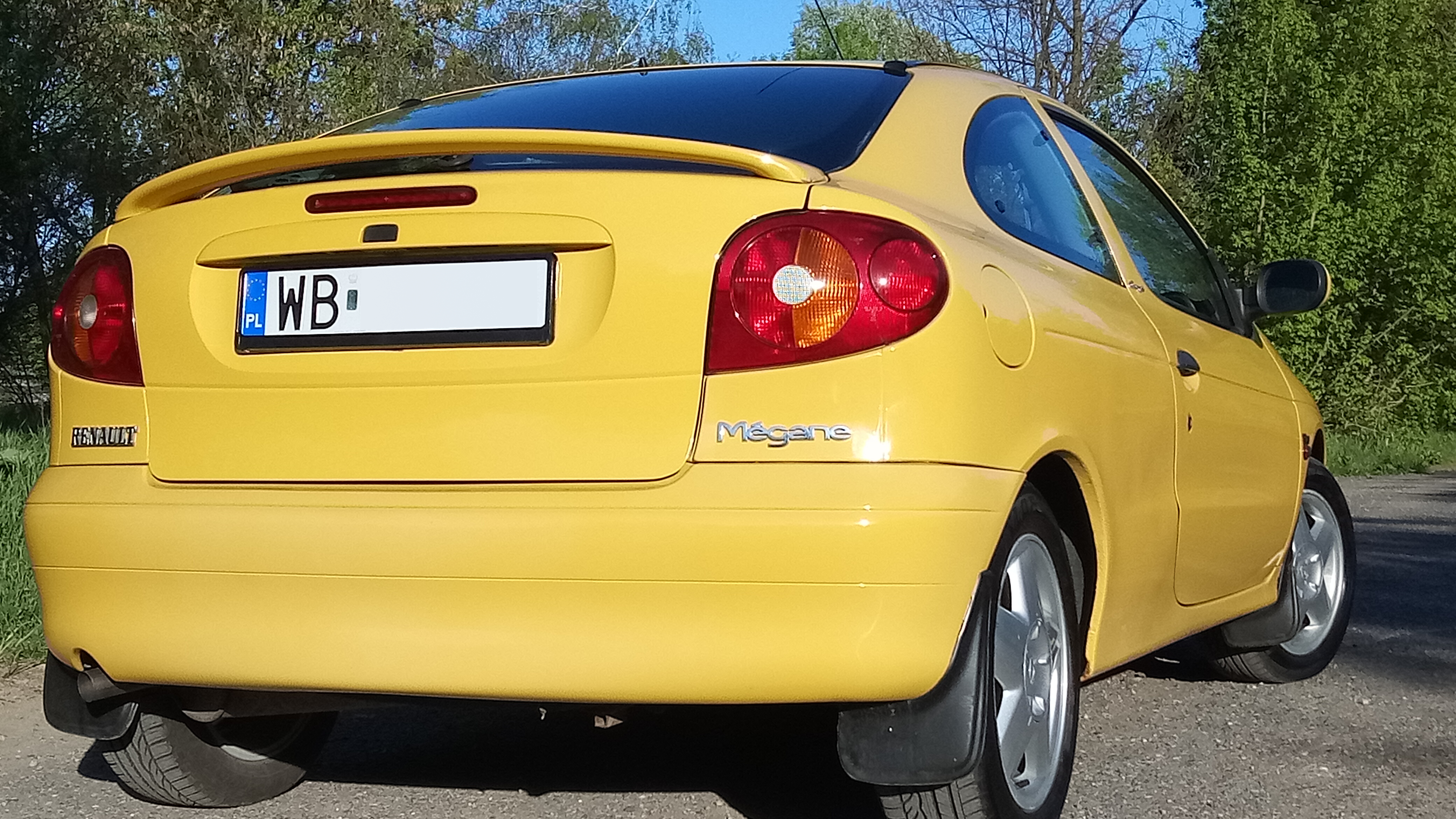
Post-facelift 1999 Renault Megane Coupe

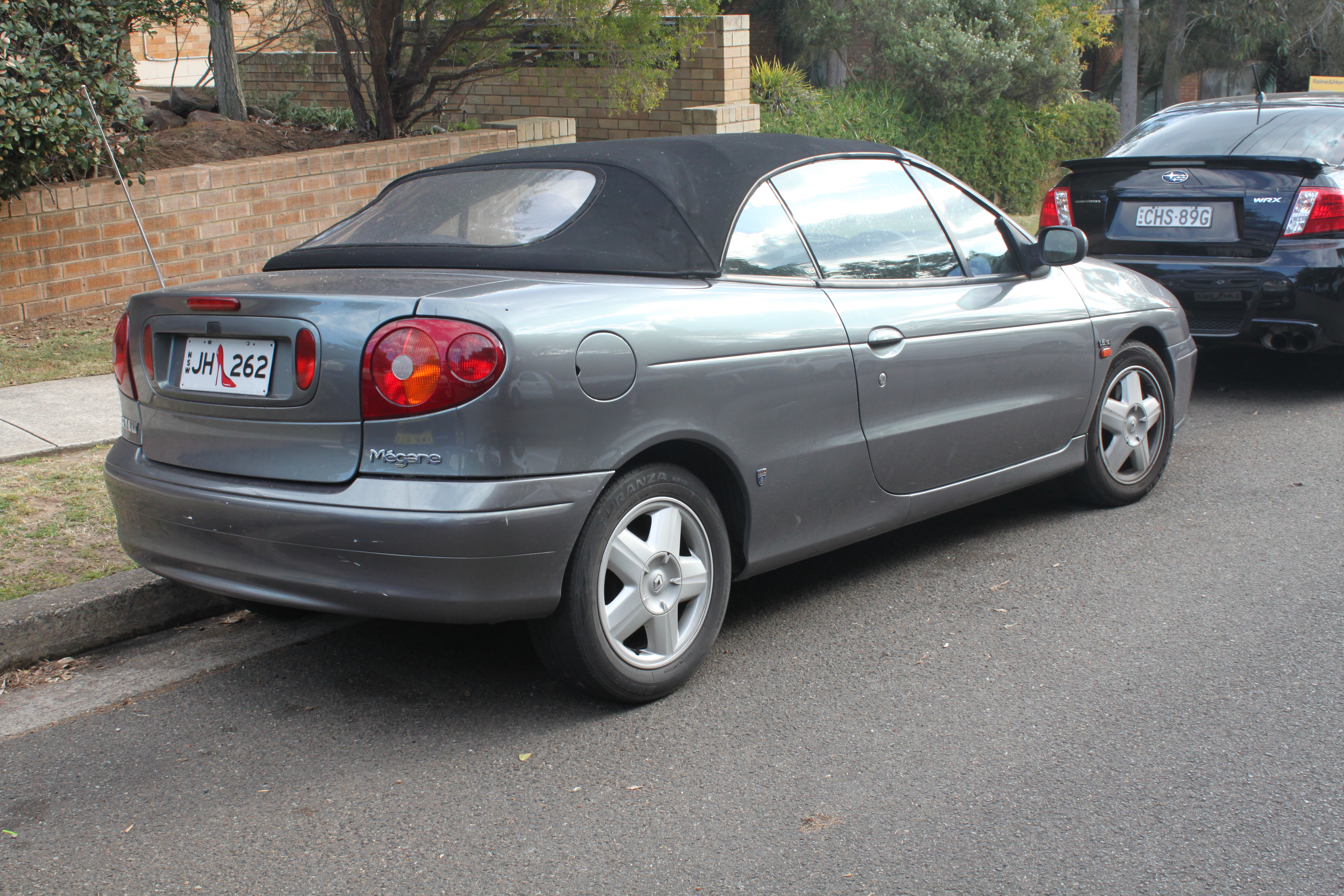
Post-facelift Renault Mégane (convertible)

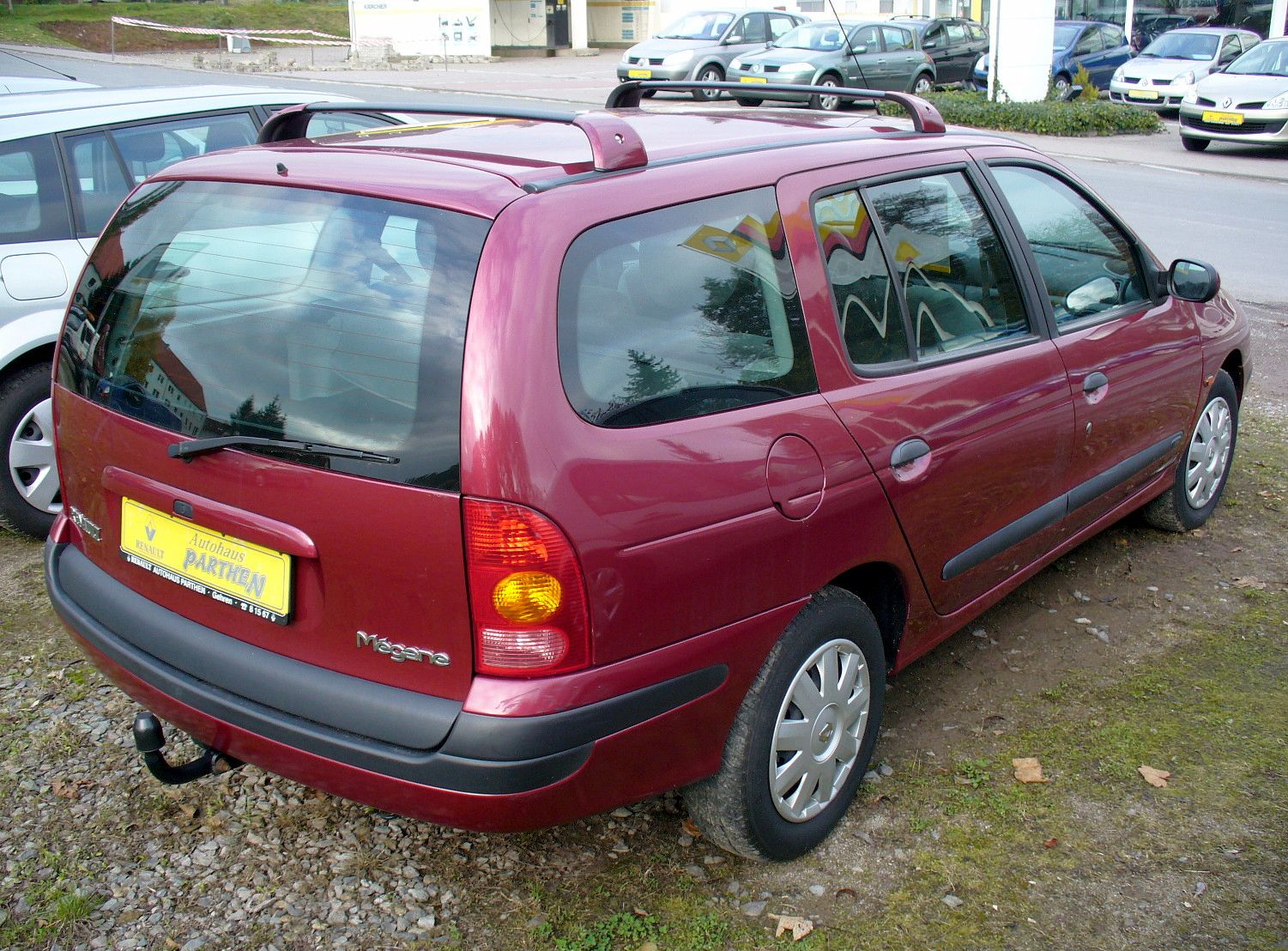
Post-facelift Renault Mégane (estate)

=== South America ===
In countries, such as Argentina and Colombia, the Mégane I was available until 2010, sold as a sedan and an estate, but in Venezuela, it was available only as a sedan. It features as the top line of the model the LA04 engine (16 valves, 1.6 litres and 110 HP), and was produced by both Renault Colombia and Renault Argentina, in where it was one of the best selling cars to date.

It is a car with more advanced safety features, upgraded equipment and more. The Mégane I had a lower price than the Mégane II.

In Venezuela, it was only available in one version: Unique, with a five-speed manual gearbox or a four-speed automatic one. Both of these were equipped with Abs and other extra equipment including driver and passenger front airbags, foglights, leather seats, electric mirrors and electric windows. In Argentina, not every version had features such as electric windows, electric mirrors or airbags.

=== Engines ===
Model	Displacement	Type code	Power	Top speed	0–100 km/h (0–62 mph) (s)
1.4 8v Eco	1,390 cc (84.8 cu in)	E7J	70 hp (52 kW)	168 km/h (104 mph)	14.5
1.4 8v	1,390 cc (84.8 cu in)	E7J	75 hp (56 kW)	170 km/h (106 mph)	13.8
1.4 16v	1,390 cc (84.8 cu in)	K4J	98 hp (73 kW)	184 km/h (114 mph)	11.8
1.6 8v	1,598 cc (97.5 cu in)	K7M	90 hp (67 kW)	184 km/h (114 mph)	11.5
1.6 16v	1,598 cc (97.5 cu in)	K4M	110 hp (82 kW)	195 km/h (121 mph)	9.8
1.8 16v	1,783 cc (108.8 cu in)	F4P	120 hp (89 kW)	198 km/h (123 mph)	9.5
2.0 8v	1,998 cc (121.9 cu in)	F3R	115 hp (86 kW)	197 km/h (122 mph)	9.7
2.0 16v	1,998 cc (121.9 cu in)	F4R	139 hp (104 kW)	213 km/h (132 mph)	8.6
2.0 16v	1,998 cc (121.9 cu in)	F7R	150 hp (112 kW)	215 km/h (134 mph)	8.6
2.0 16v IDE	1,998 cc (121.9 cu in)	F5R	140 hp (104 kW)	213 km/h (132 mph)	8.6
1.9 8v D Eco	1,870 cc (114.1 cu in)	F8Q	65 hp (48 kW)	160 km/h (99 mph)	17.8
1.9 8v TD	1,870 cc (114.1 cu in)	F8Q	95 hp (71 kW)	178 km/h (111 mph)	12.6
1.9 8v dTi	1,870 cc (114.1 cu in)	F9Q	80 hp (60 kW)	170 km/h (106 mph)	13.8
1.9 8v dTi	1,870 cc (114.1 cu in)	F9Q	100 hp (75 kW)	183 km/h (114 mph)	12.3
1.9 8v dCi	1,870 cc (114.1 cu in)	F9Q	105 hp (78 kW)	189 km/h (117 mph)	11.5

=== Maxi Mégane ===
Renault Maxi Mégane
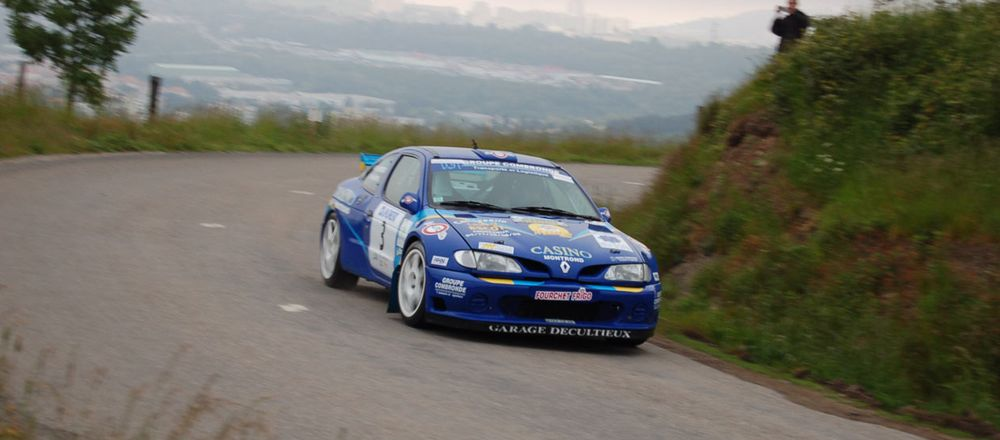

Overview
- Manufacturer: Renault Sport
- Assembly: France

Body and chassis
- Class: F2 Kit Car
- Body style: 2-door coupé
- Layout: FF layout
- Platform: Renault Mégane I
- Related: Renault Megane I

Powertrain
- Engine: 2.0 L F7R710 I4
- Transmission: 7-speed sequential manual

Dimensions
- Length: 3,952 mm (155.6 in)
- Width: 1,823 mm (71.8 in)
- Height: 1,360 mm (53.5 in)
- Curb weight: 960 kg (2,116 lb)

Chronology
- Predecessor: Renault Clio Williams Maxi

During the 1990s, Renault Sport developed a rally car for the Formula 2 Kit Car regulations. This was the Clio Williams Maxi, which was the first car truly developed for the F2 Kit Car category, and first appeared in 1996. However, rivals such as Citroën and Peugeot soon introduced bigger and more powerful cars, which resulted in Renault producing an F2 version of the Mégane in 1996. The Maxi Mégane officially represented the brand in French Championship rallies in 1996 and 1997 with drivers like Philippe Bugalski, Jean Ragnotti or Serge Jordan, and the British Rally Championship from 1996 to 1999, with Grégoire De Mévius, Alain Oreille, Robbie Head, Martin Rowe, and Tapio Laukkanen. Both the French and British rally teams also compete in the World Rally Championship.

After the works programme was discontinued, many privateers continued to use the car. It was also used in the FIA 2-Litre World Rally Cup, which Renault won in 1999. The car used a special version of the Renault F7R engine, and had a seven speed Sequential manual transmission.

Its most notable result was an outright victory in the 1996 Tour de Corse in the hands of Philippe Bugalski and his co driver Jean-Paul Chiaroni (in a year where the Tour de Corse was a FIA 2-Litre World Rally Cup only event); but it also helped Renault to the FIA 2 Litre World Rally Cup of Manufacturer's title in 1999.

In other high level competitions, Renault took back to back manufacturer's and driver's titles in the British Rally Championship in 1998 and 1999, whilst they also took the European Rally Championship in 1999.

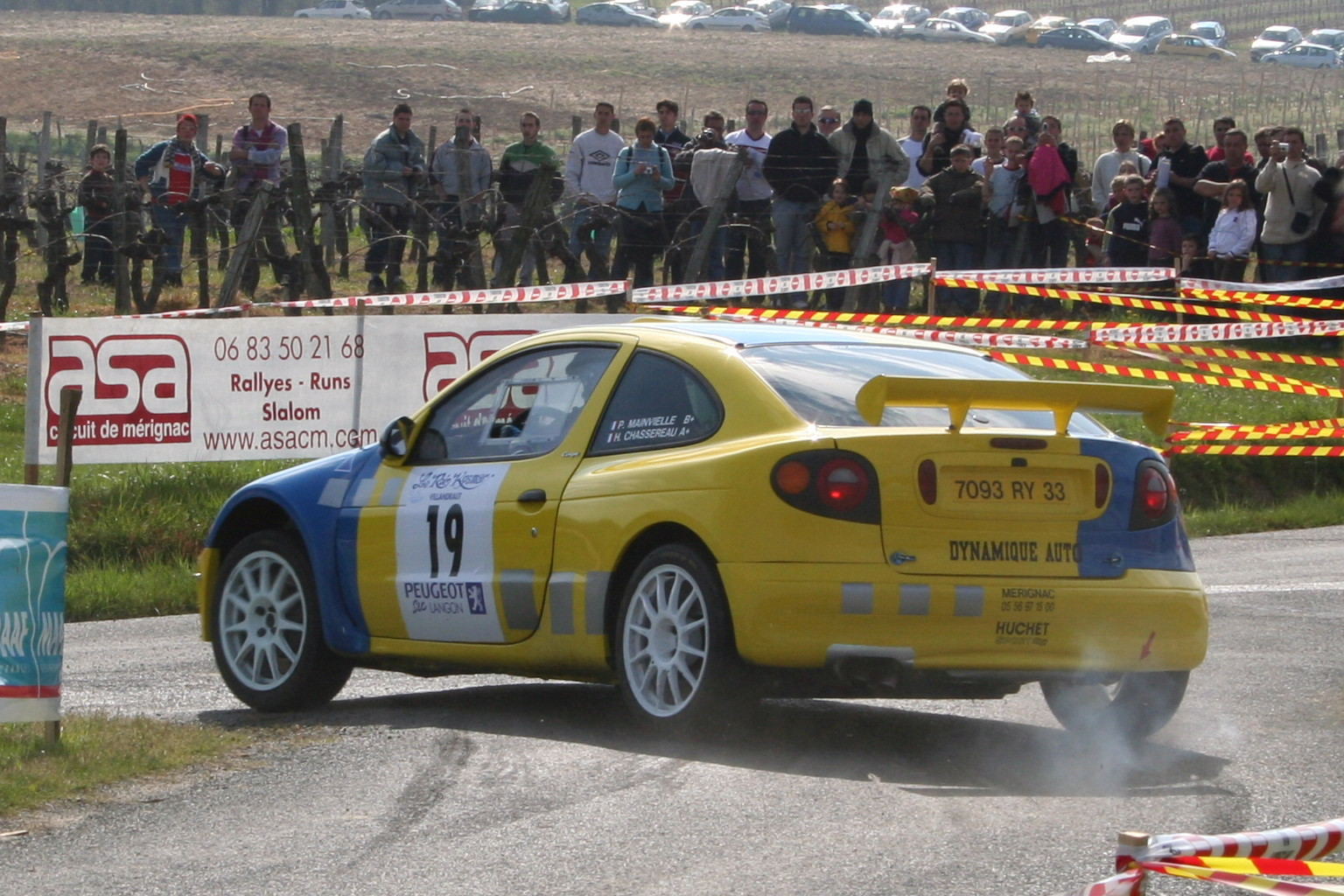
A privately entered Maxi Mégane at the 2006 Rallye des Côtes de Garonne, driven by Pierre Mainvielle.

== Second generation (X84; 2002) ==
Mégane II
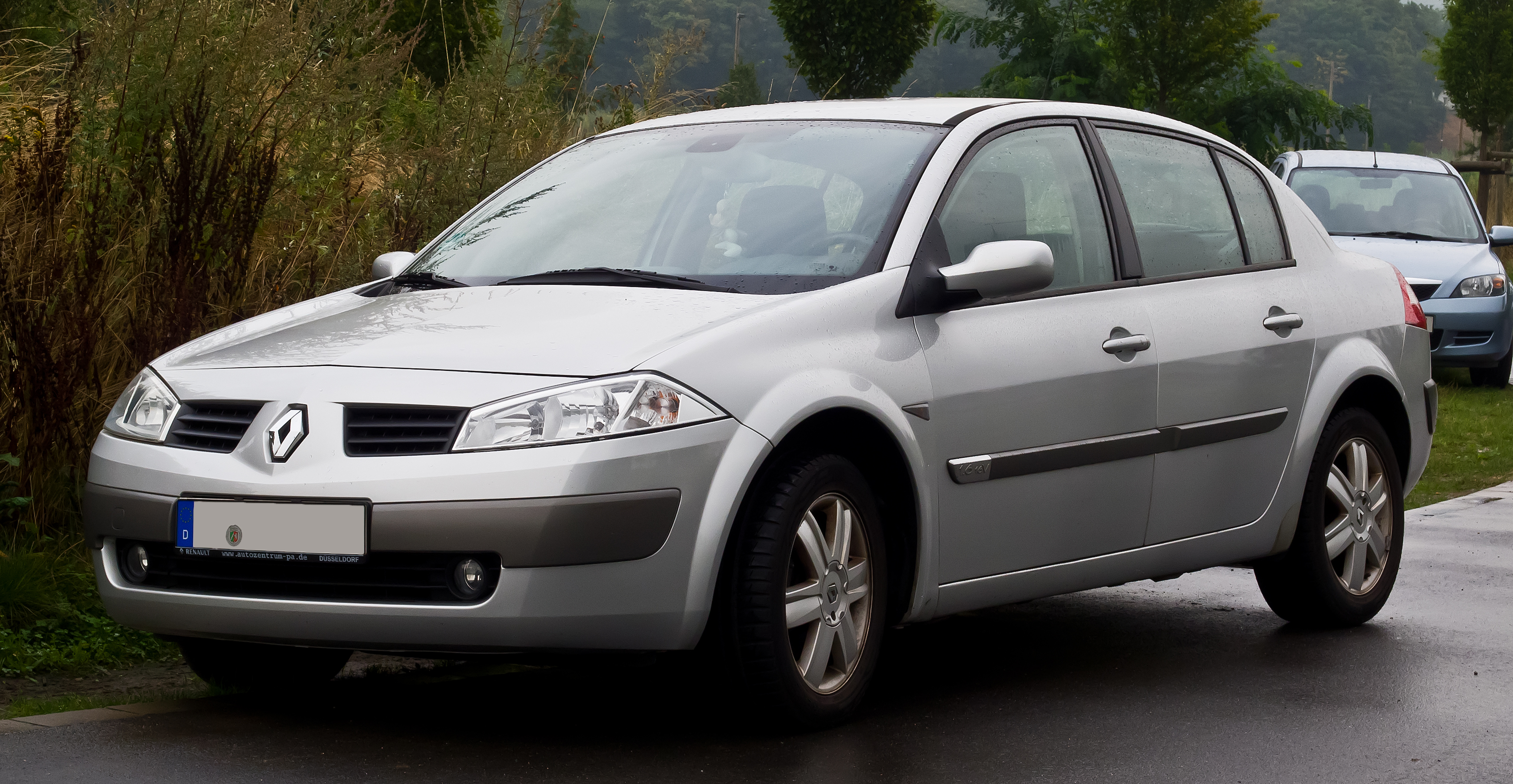
- Sedan (pre-facelift)

Overview
- Model code: X84; BM0/1, CM0/1; KM0/1 (Grandtour)
- Production: December 11, 2002–2008; 2006–2010 (Brazil, sedan); 2006–2012 (Brazil, estate); 2009–2012 (Iran)
- Model years: 2003–2008
- Assembly: Turkey: Nilüfer, Bursa (Oyak-Renault, sedan models only); France: Douai (Douai Factory, 3 door hatchback models only); Germany: Osnabruck (Karmann, C+C models only); Spain: Palencia (Renault Spain, 5 door hatchback and station wagon models only); Brazil: Curitiba (Renault do Brasil, South America models only); Iran: Tehran (Pars Khodro, Asia and Africa models only); Indonesia: Jakarta (Indomobil, Southeast Asia and Far East models only)
- Designer: Under the lead of Patrick Le Quément

Body and chassis
- Body style: 4-door saloon 5-door estate 3-door hatchback 5-door hatchback 2-door convertible
- Platform: Renault–Nissan C platform
- Related: Mégane Renault Sport; Renault Scénic; Renault Koleos; Nissan X-Trail; Nissan Sentra; Nissan Rogue; Nissan Qashqai; Nissan Lafesta

Powertrain
- Engine: Petrol – naturally aspirated: 1.4 L K4J I4; 1.6 L K4M I4; 2.0 L F4R I4; Petrol – turbocharged: 2.0 L F4RT I4; Diesel – turbocharged: 1.5 L K9K dCi I4; 1.9 L F9Q dCi I4; 2.0 L M9R dCi I4
- Transmission: 5/6-speed manual; 4-speed automatic

Dimensions
- Wheelbase: Hatchback: 2,625 mm (103.3 in); Sedan & Wagon: 2,686 mm (105.7 in); Convertible: 2,522 mm (99.3 in)
- Length: Hatchback: 4,209 mm (165.7 in); Sedan & Wagon: 4,498 mm (177.1 in); Convertible: 4,355 mm (171.5 in)
- Width: 1,777 mm (70.0 in)
- Height: Sedan: 1,460 mm (57.5 in); Wagon: 1,505 mm (59.3 in); Convertible: 1,514 mm (59.6 in)
- Curb weight: Hatchback: 1,175 kg (2,590 lb)

Chronology
- Successor: Renault Fluence (sedan)

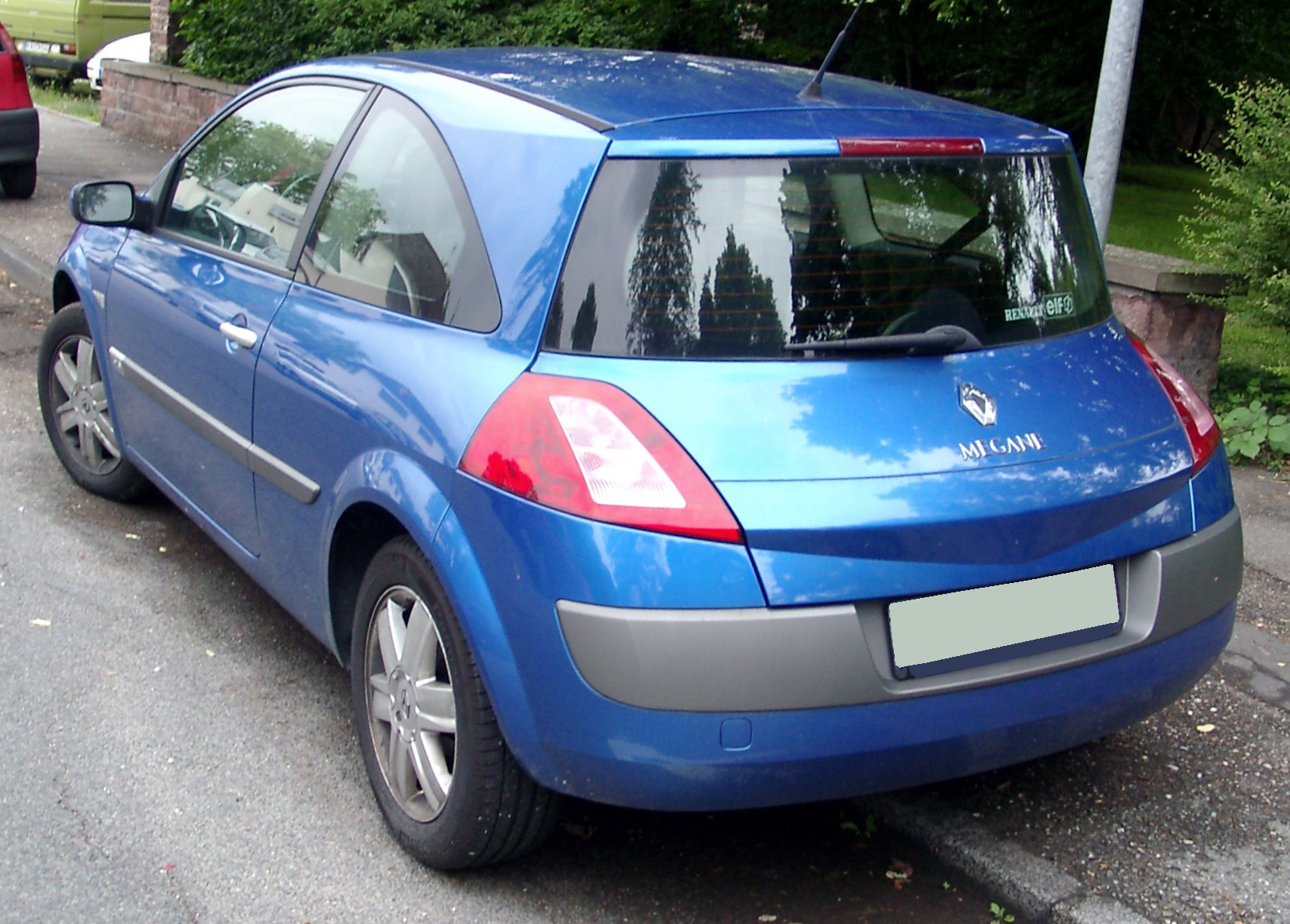
Three-door hatchback (pre-facelift)

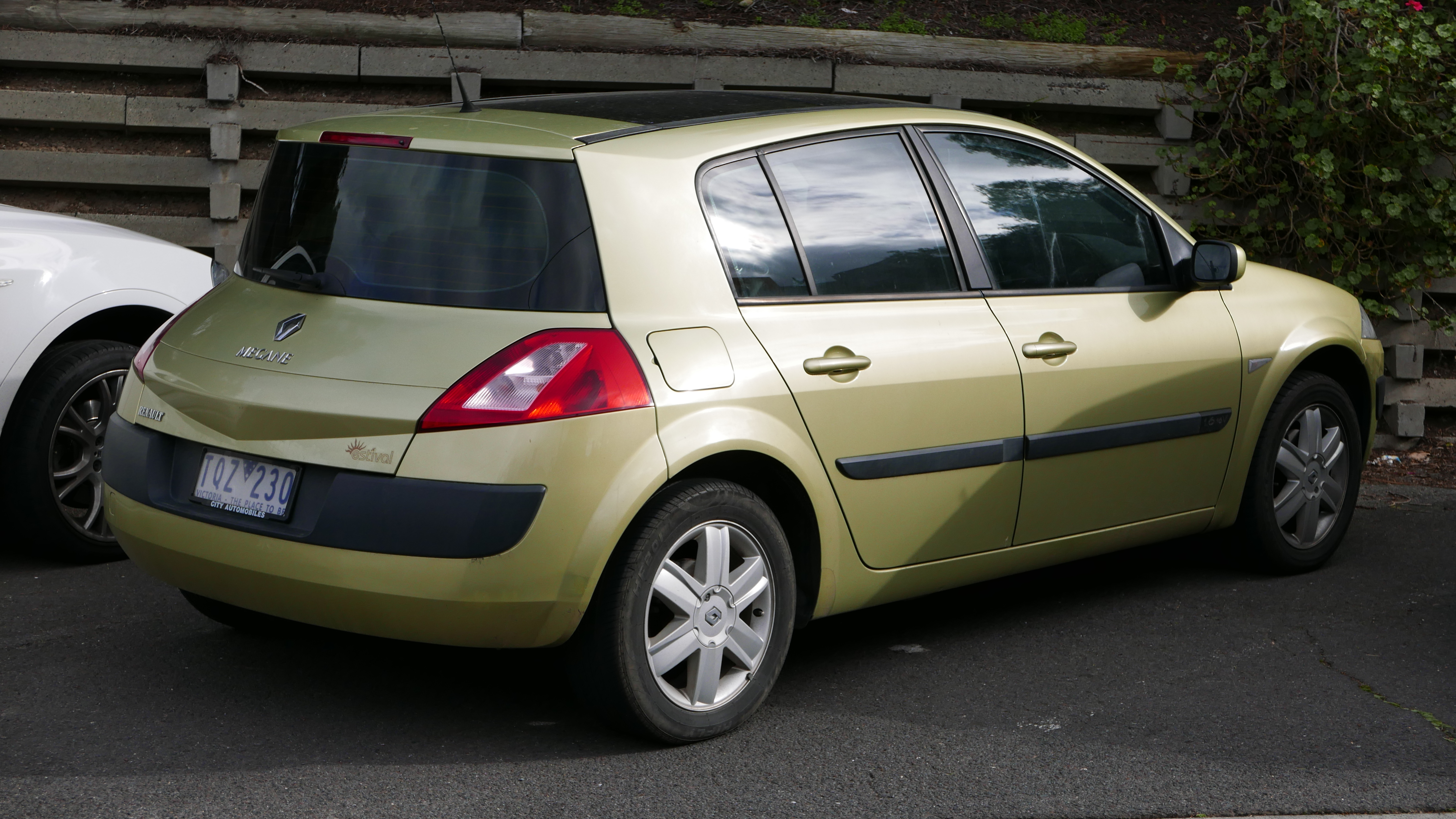
Five-door hatchback (pre-facelift)

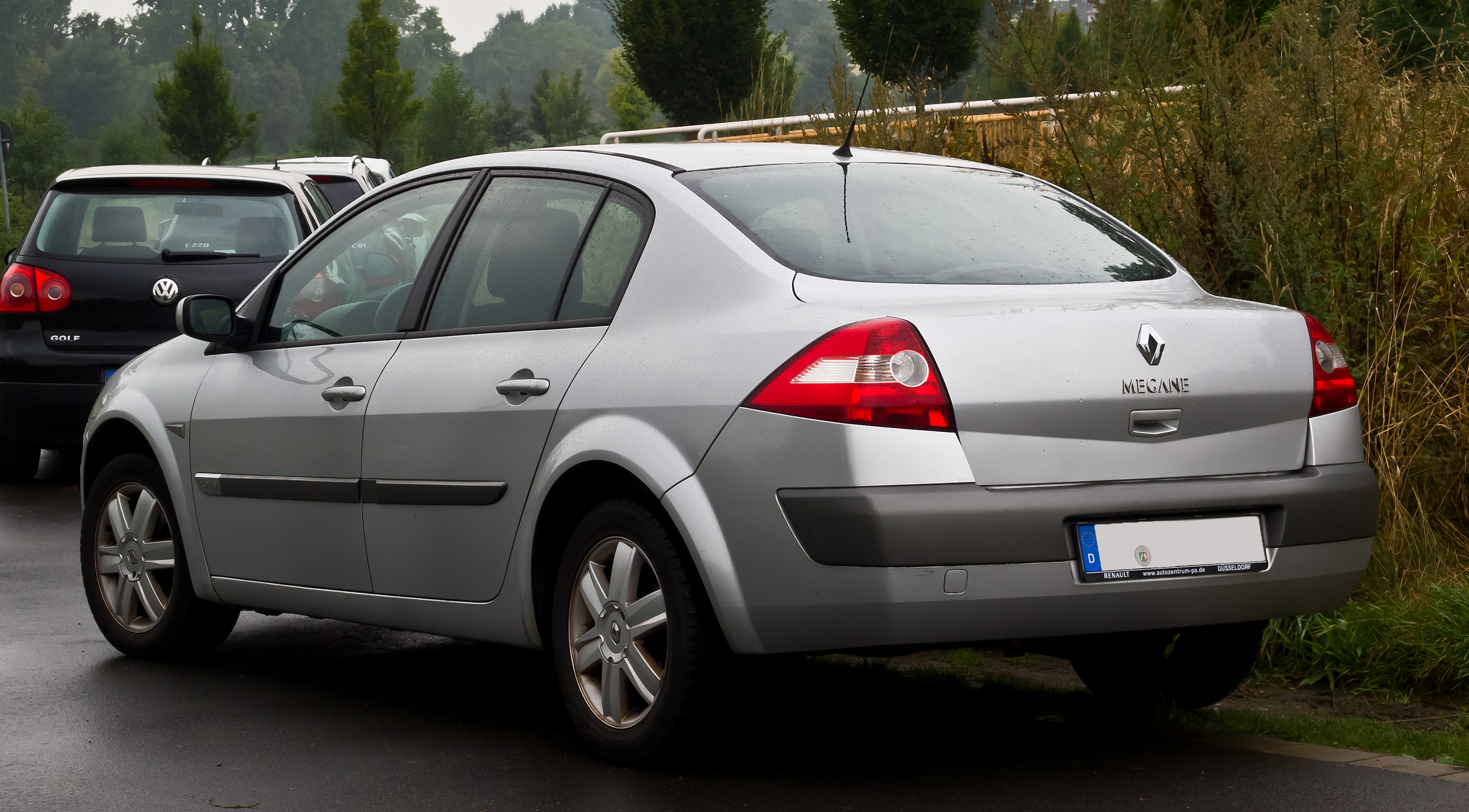
Sedan (pre-facelift)

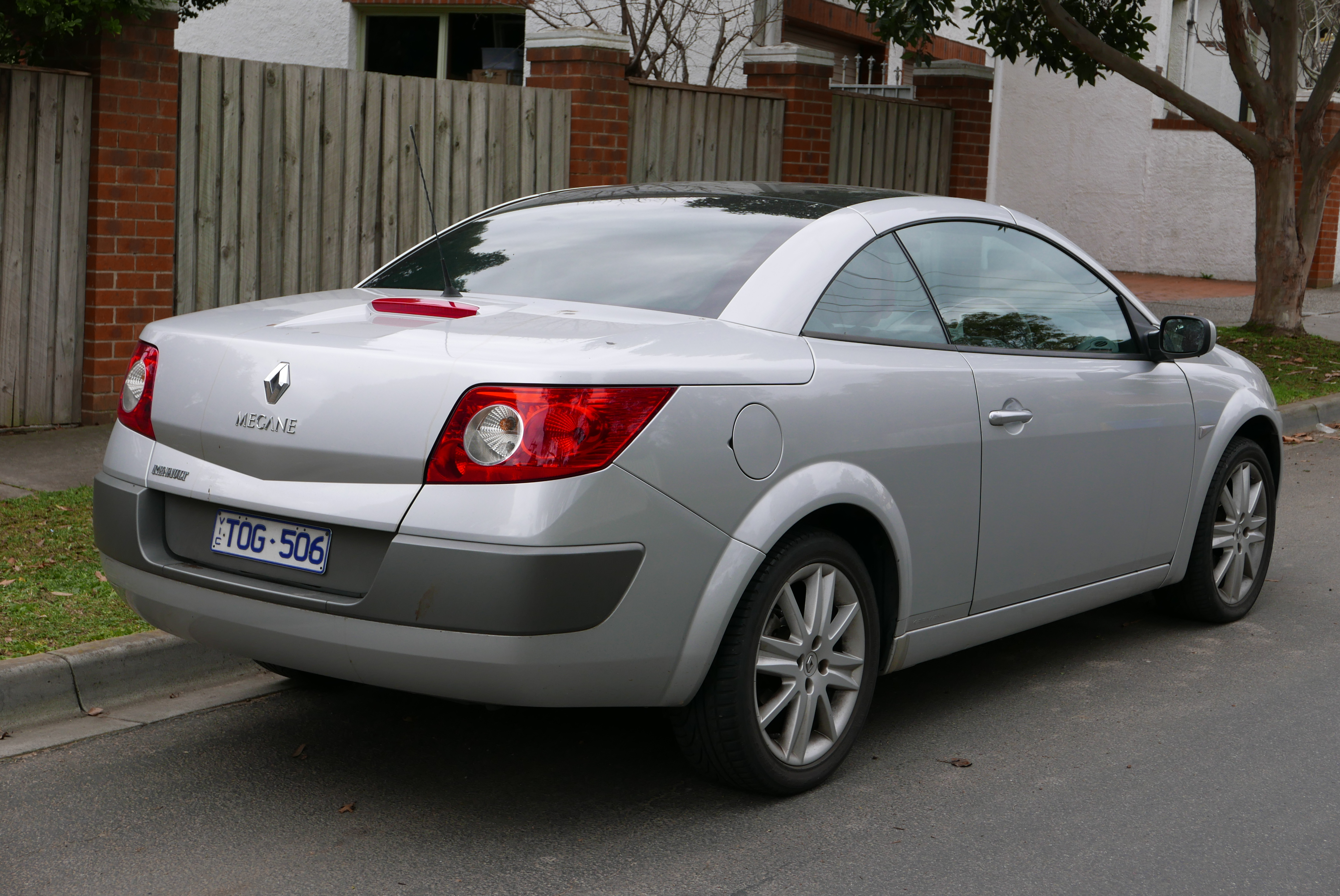
CC (pre-facelift)

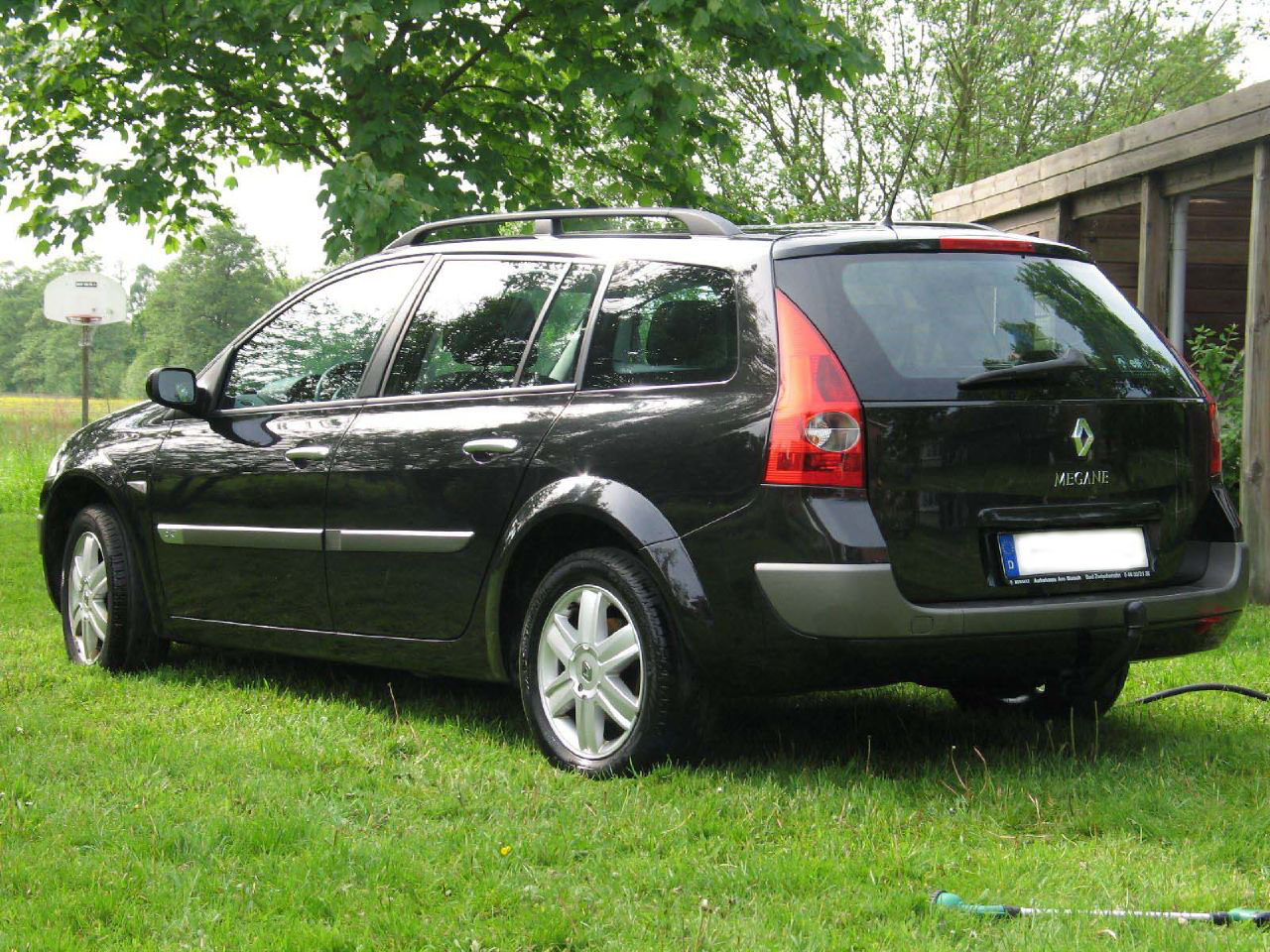
Grand Tour (pre-facelift)

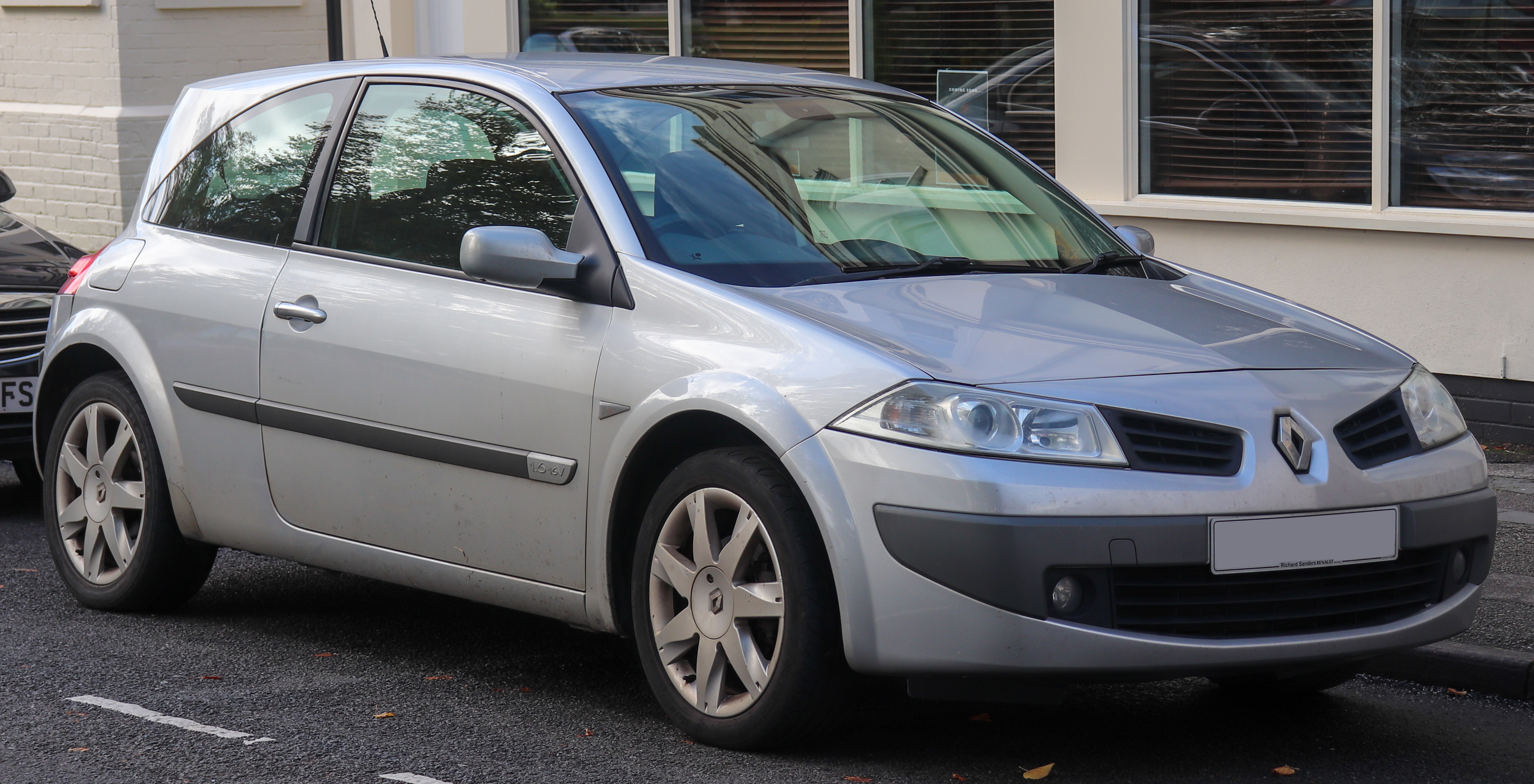

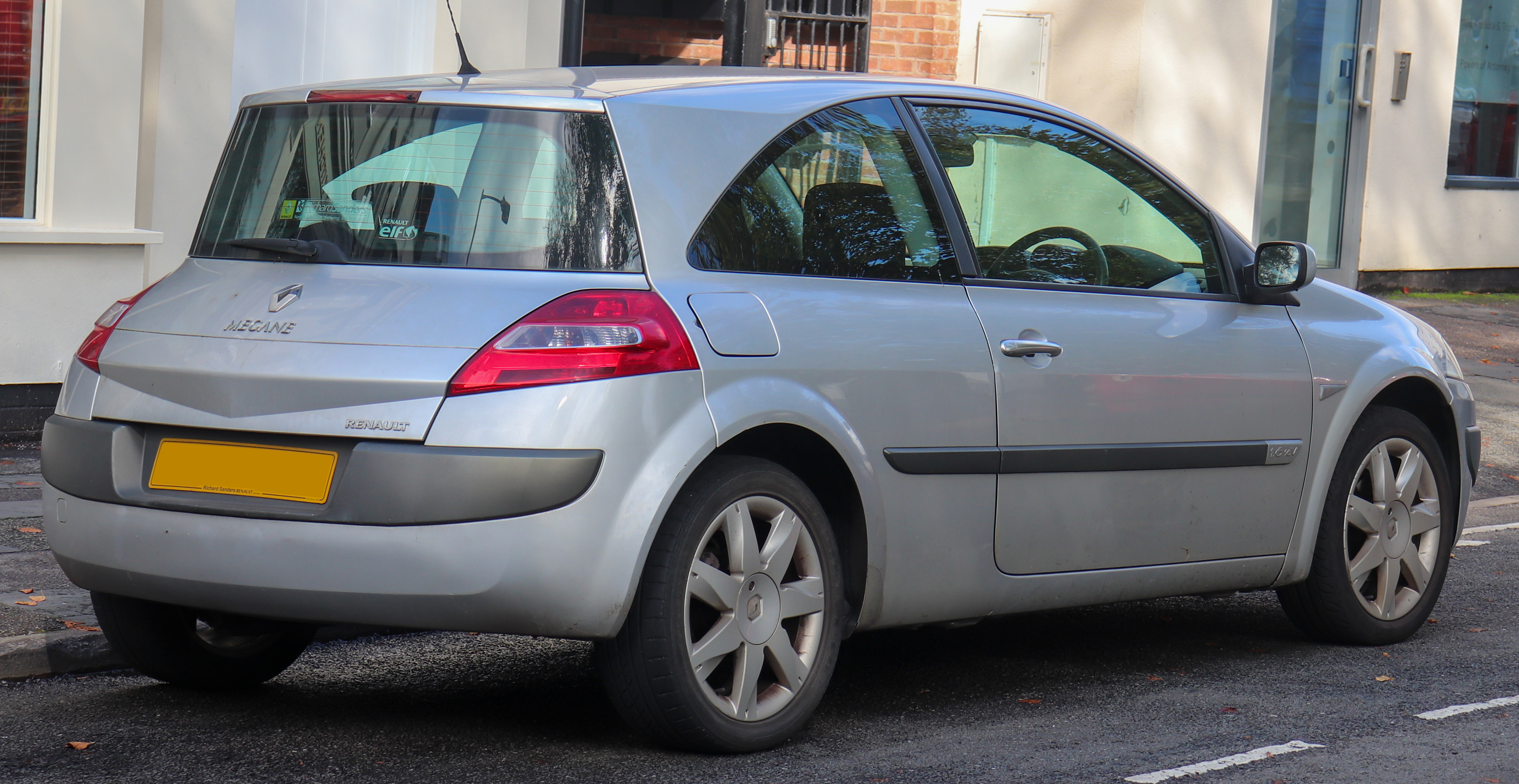
Three-door hatchback (facelift)

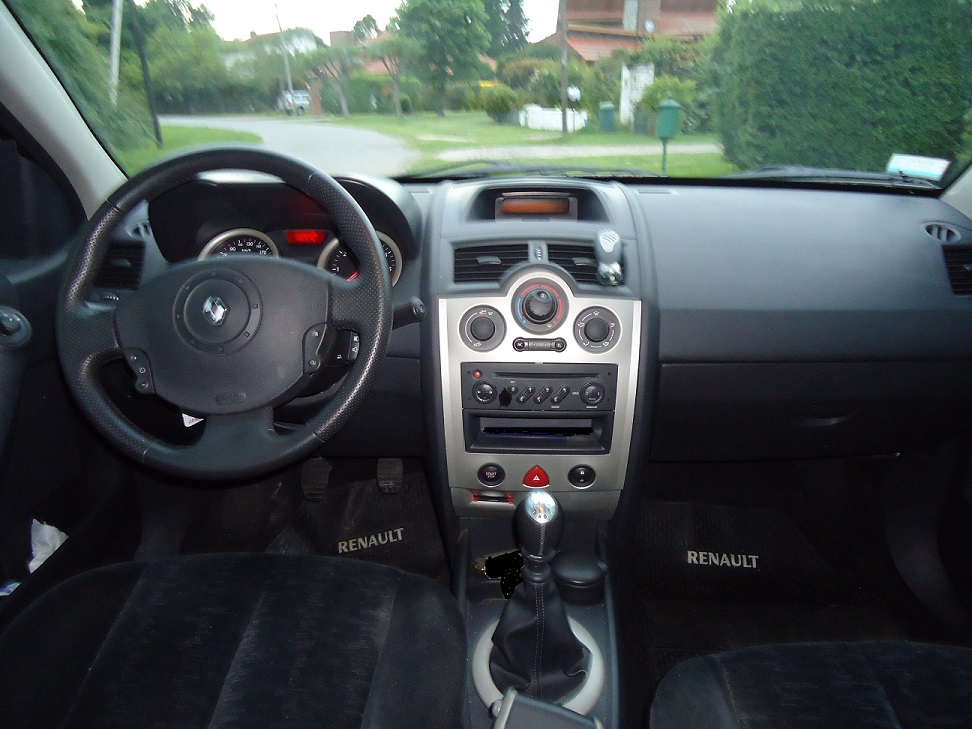
Interior (pre-facelift)

The Mégane II was launched in September 2002 for the 2003 model year, and marked a completely new fresh start. The two cars bear very little resemblance, the new vehicle having been inspired by the manufacturer's new design language first seen in the Avantime.

The new Mégane was voted European Car of the Year for 2003, fighting off stiff competition from Japan's Mazda3 and PSA's Citroën C3, and achieved a five star safety rating in the Euro NCAP crash tests, the first small family car to do so.

The Mégane II and the Laguna were both showcases for a great deal of technologies Renault launched at the beginning of the 2000s; the Renault Card keyless ignition system, standard on the Mégane II, was a first in this class and has since been widely adopted.

Similarly, the option of a panoramic glass sunroof is another area in which Renault led where others followed. In June 2003, the first ever live crash test using a real driver rather than a crash test dummy featuring the Mégane II was conducted by Top Gear.

The Mégane II sedan was assembled in Iran by Pars Khodro from 2008 to 2013.

In Brazil, Renault launched a flex fuel version, called "Hi-Flex", which is able to run either with unleaded petrol or ethanol. Like the Brazilian Scénic and Clio versions, the Mégane's engine can work with any mix of petrol and ethanol, due to the use of an electronic control module.

The flex version has a 16V 110 hp (81 kW), 115 hp (85 kW) with ethanol, 1.6-litre inline-four engine developed and produced in Brazil, but the 2.0-litre, French-built engine can not be run on ethanol.

As with the previous Mégane, the range of models is wide; there is a three and five door hatchback available, named "Sport Hatch" and "Hatch" respectively, there is a four-door saloon/sedan (Sport Saloon), a five-door estate (Sport Tourer / Grandtour), and to replace both the Mégane Coupe and Convertible, a new retractable hardtop coupe designed by Karmann. Unlike the previous model, the estate version was sold in RHD for the first time.

Unlike its predecessor, the Mégane II was not licensed by Yanase Co., Ltd. for the Japanese market, as Renault had acquired a stake in Nissan when the Mégane I was still in production. Instead, the Mégane II was licensed by Nissan Motor Co., Ltd. and sold exclusively through Nissan Red Stage Store locations.

=== Mégane RS ===
The RenaultSport (RS) versions of the three door and five door Mégane hatchbacks were introduced, equipped with a turbocharged petrol 2.0 L 16v engine producing 225 PS (165 kW; 222 hp) and Turbocharged diesel 2.0L dCi 16V engine producing 175 PS (129 kW;173 hp). Along with the engine, changes were made to the front and rear suspension geometry to improve handling, and the model features a deeper, wider front bumper. The Mégane Renault Sport competes in the hot hatch segment of the market.

=== Facelift ===
The hatchback model was revised at Motor Show Brussels in January 2006, the wagon and convertible debuted at Geneva Motor Show in March 2006, with changes in interior trim (e.g. a new revised instrument cluster with the speedometer moved to the right and the tachometer moved to the left), specification levels and most notably, a new nose. A new front suspension system borrowed from the Mégane 2.0 225 PS (165 kW; 222 hp) was adopted, improving the driving performance. Also the Nissan Sentra B16 is based on the 2006 Renault Mégane platform.

=== Engines ===
Model	Displacement	Type code	Power	Top Speed	0–100 km/h (0–62 mph) (s)
1.4 16v 80	1,390 cc (84.8 cu in)	K4J	80 hp (60 kW; 81 PS)	170 km/h (106 mph)	13.5
1.4 16v 98	1,390 cc (84.8 cu in)	K4J	98 PS (97 hp; 72 kW)	183 km/h (114 mph)	12.5
1.6 16v	1,598 cc (97.5 cu in)	K4M	118 PS (116 hp; 87 kW)	196 km/h (122 mph)	10.8
2.0 16v	1,998 cc (121.9 cu in)	F4R	136 PS (134 hp; 100 kW)	205 km/h (127 mph)	9.6
2.0 16v Turbo	1,998 cc (121.9 cu in)	F4RT	165 PS (163 hp; 121 kW)	220 km/h (137 mph)	8.3
2.0 16v Turbo RenaultSport	1,998 cc (121.9 cu in)	F4RT	225 PS (222 hp; 165 kW)	236 km/h (147 mph)	6.5
1.5 8v dCi 80	1,461 cc (89.2 cu in)	K9K	80 PS (79 hp; 59 kW)	170 km/h (106 mph)	14.3
1.5 8v dCi 86	1,461 cc (89.2 cu in)	K9K	86 PS (85 hp; 63 kW)	174 km/h (108 mph)	12.7
1.5 8v dCi 100	1,461 cc (89.2 cu in)	K9K	100 PS (99 hp; 74 kW)	181 km/h (112 mph)	12.8
1.5 8v dCi 106	1,461 cc (89.2 cu in)	K9K	106 PS (105 hp; 78 kW)	185 km/h (115 mph)	11.1
1.9 8v dCi 120	1,870 cc (114.1 cu in)	F9Q	120 PS (118 hp; 88 kW)	196 km/h (122 mph)	10.5
1.9 8v dCi 130	1,870 cc (114.1 cu in)	F9Q	130 PS (128 hp; 96 kW)	200 km/h (124 mph)	9.0
2.0 16v dCi 150	1,995 cc (121.7 cu in)	M9R	150 PS (148 hp; 110 kW)	210 km/h (130 mph)	8.7
2.0 16v dCi RenaultSport	1,995 cc (121.7 cu in)	M9R	175 PS (173 hp; 129 kW)	221 km/h (137 mph)	8.5

=== Reception ===
During its first full year of sales, the Mégane II topped the French sales charts, with 198,874 registered in 2003. It has also sold very well in Britain, being the nation's fourth most popular car in 2005 and the nation's fifth most popular car in 2004 and 2006. In 2007, it dipped to eighth place, with just over 55,000 examples being sold.

The Mégane sedan was the best-selling car in Turkey from 2004 to 2006.

=== Chinese copy controversy ===
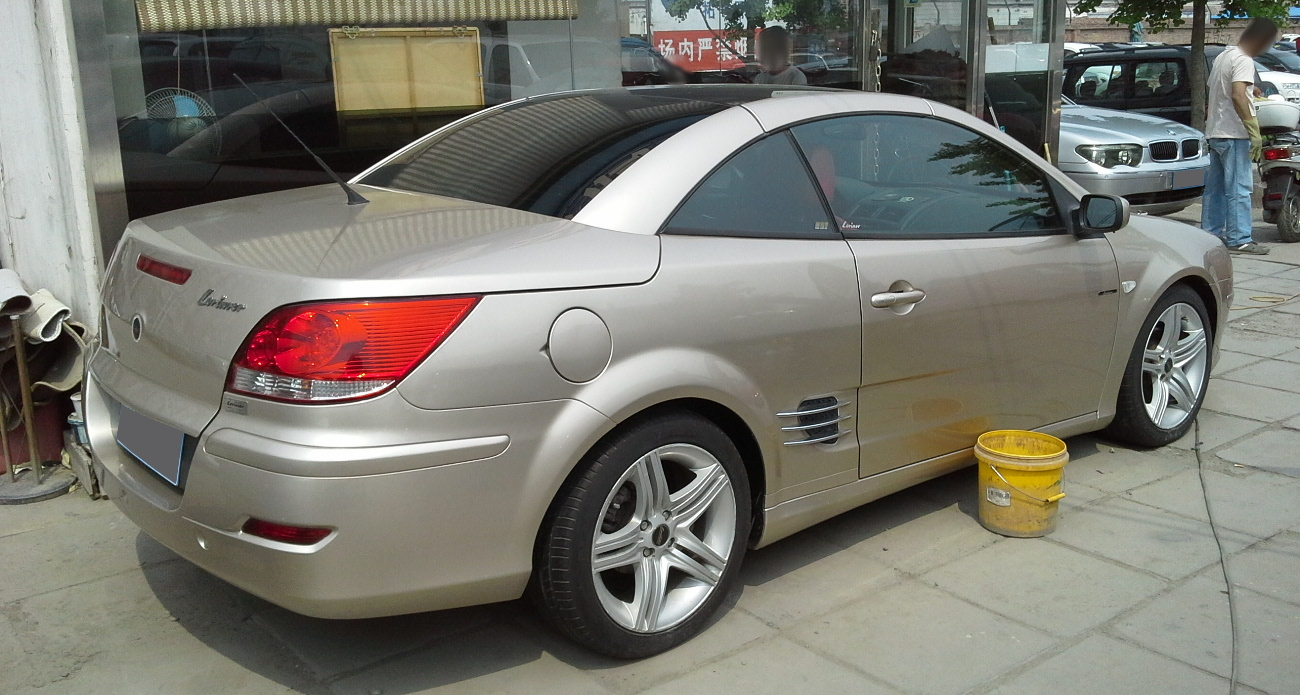
BYD S8 rear

The BYD S8, a Chinese convertible, shares a rear design with the Renault Mégane CC.

=== Safety ===
ANCAP test results* Renault Megane 5 door hatch (2003)
Test	Score
Overall	5 /5 stars
Frontal offset	14.10/16
Side impact	16/16
Pole	2/2
Seat belt reminders	1/3
Whiplash protection	Not Assessed
Pedestrian protection	Marginal
Electronic stability control	Not Assed

ANCAP test results* Renault Megane 2 door coupe/cabriolet (2004)
Test	Score
Overall	5 /5 stars
Frontal offset	15.73/16
Side impact	14.82/16
Pole	2/2
Seat belt reminders	1/3
Whiplash protection	Not Assessed
Pedestrian protection	Marginal
Electronic stability control	Not Assed

== Third generation (X95/X32; 2008) ==
Mégane III
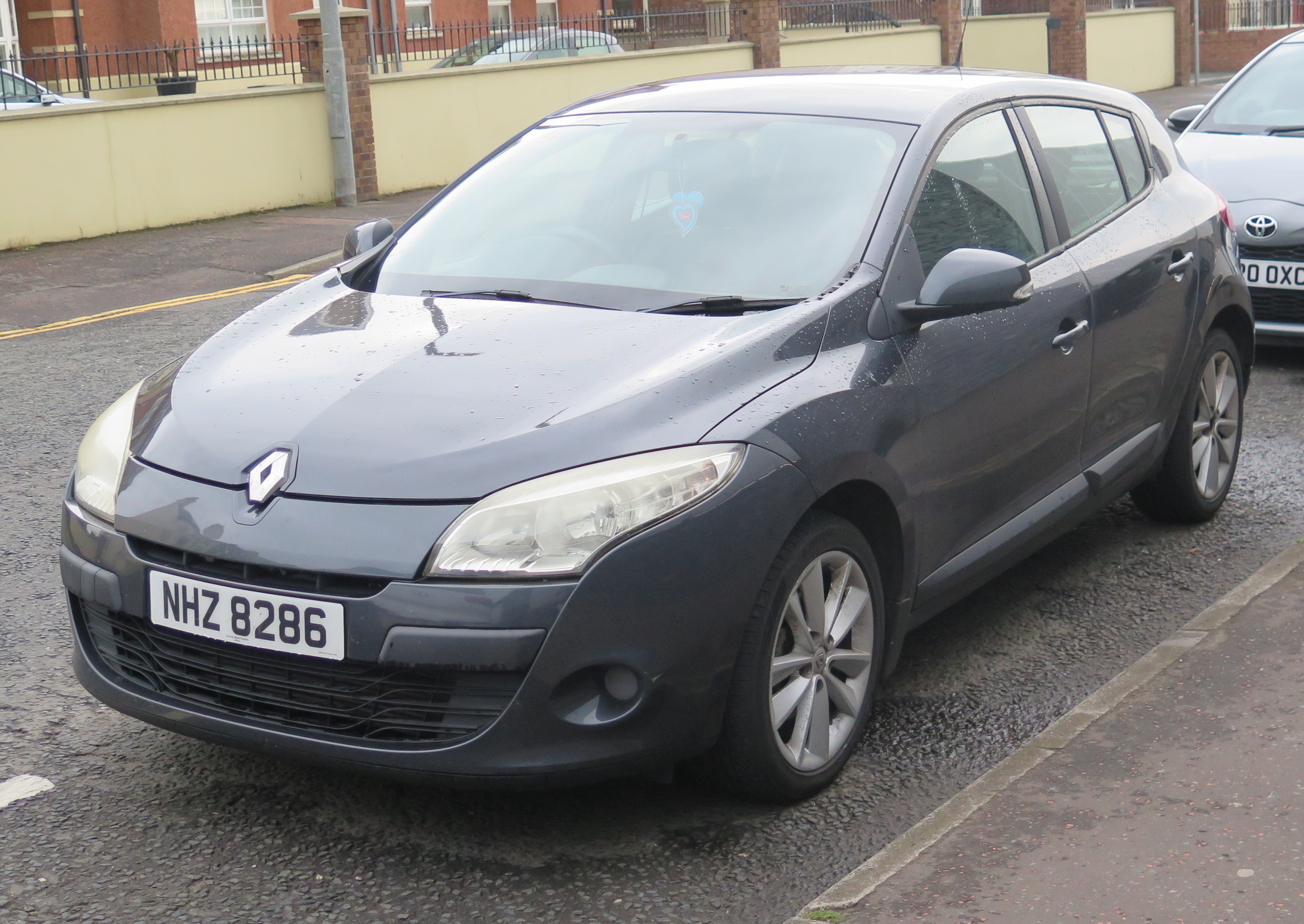

Overview
- Model code: X95; X32 (Turkish/Russian-made models); BZ0/1 (hatchback); KZ0/1 (Grandtour); DZ (coupe); EZ (coupe-cabriolet)
- Also called: Renault Scala (Iran)
- Production: December 2008–2016
- Model years: 2009–2016
- Assembly: Turkey: Nilüfer, Bursa (Oyak-Renault: 5-door hatchback models only); France: Douai (Douai Factory: Mégane CC models only); Spain: Palencia (Renault Spain: 3-door hatchback and station wagon models only); Russia: Moscow (Avtoframos, Asia models only)
- Designer: François Leboine

Body and chassis
- Body style: 5-door hatchback 3-door hatchback 2-door coupé cabriolet 5-door estate
- Platform: Renault–Nissan C platform
- Related: Mégane Renault Sport; Renault Fluence; Renault Samsung SM3; Renault Scénic; Renault Koleos; Nissan Sentra; Nissan Rogue; Nissan Qashqai; Nissan X-Trail

Powertrain
- Engine: Petrol: 1.2 L H5Ft tCe I4 turbo 1.4 L H4Jt tCe I4 turbo 1.6 L K4M VVT I4; 1.6 L H4M sCe I4; 2.0 L M4R VVT I4; 2.0 L F4RT I4 turbo Diesel: 1.5 L K9K dCi I4 turbo 1.6 L R9M dCi I4 turbo (2011-2017); 1.9 L F9Q dCi I4 turbo (2008-2011); 2.0 L M9R dCi I4 turbo (2009-2015)
- Transmission: 5/6-speed manual 4/6-speed automatic CVT; 6-speed EDC (only dCi 110 FAP)

Dimensions
- Wheelbase: Hatchback: 2,641 mm (104.0 in); Coupe: 2,640 mm (103.9 in); Estate: 2,703 mm (106.4 in)
- Length: Hatchback: 4,295 mm (169.1 in); Coupe: 4,299 mm (169.3 in); Estate: 4,559 mm (179.5 in)
- Height: Hatchback: 1,471 mm (57.9 in); Coupe: 1,423 mm (56.0 in); Estate: 1,507 mm (59.3 in)

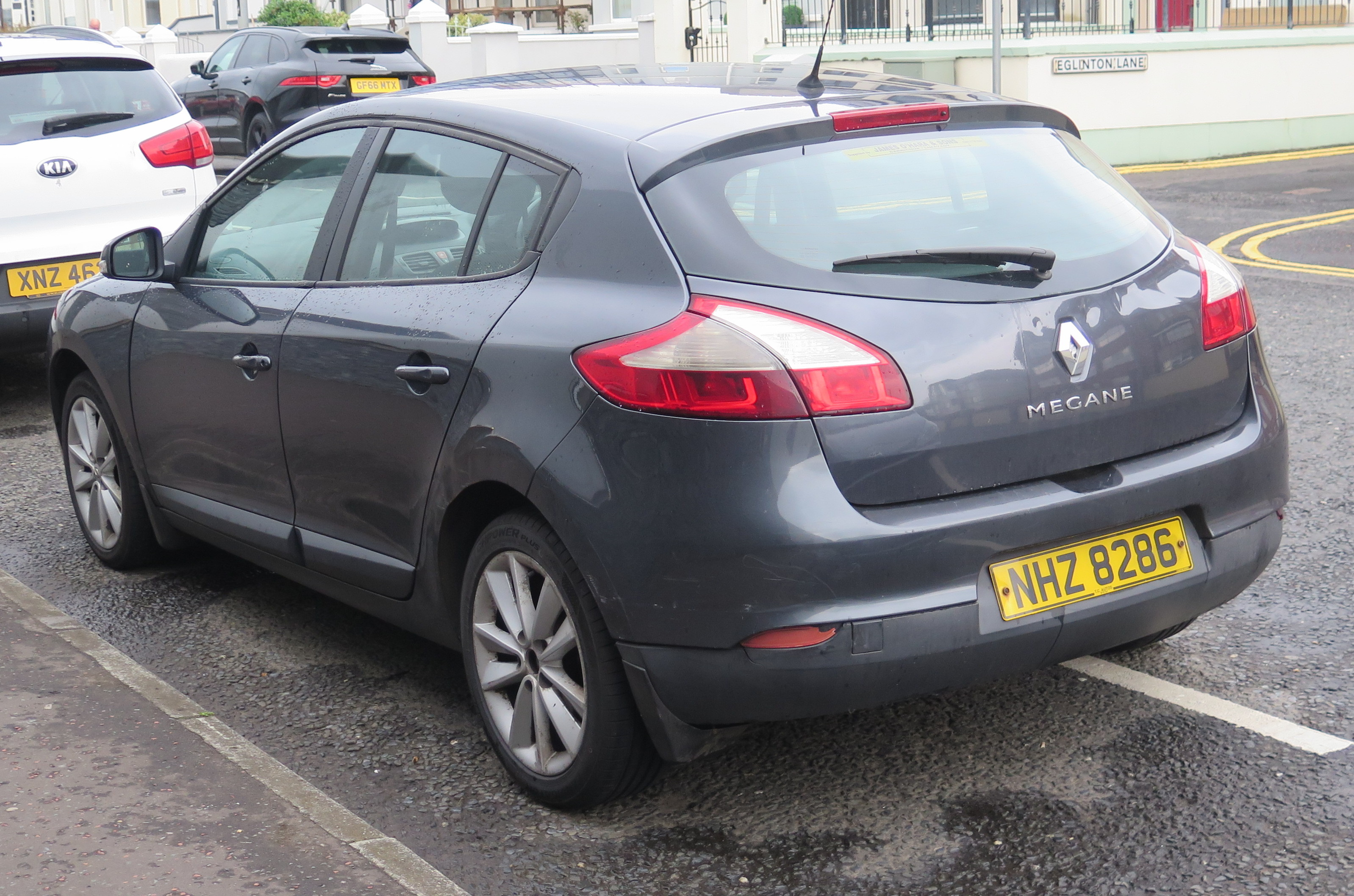
Five-door hatchback (pre-facelift)

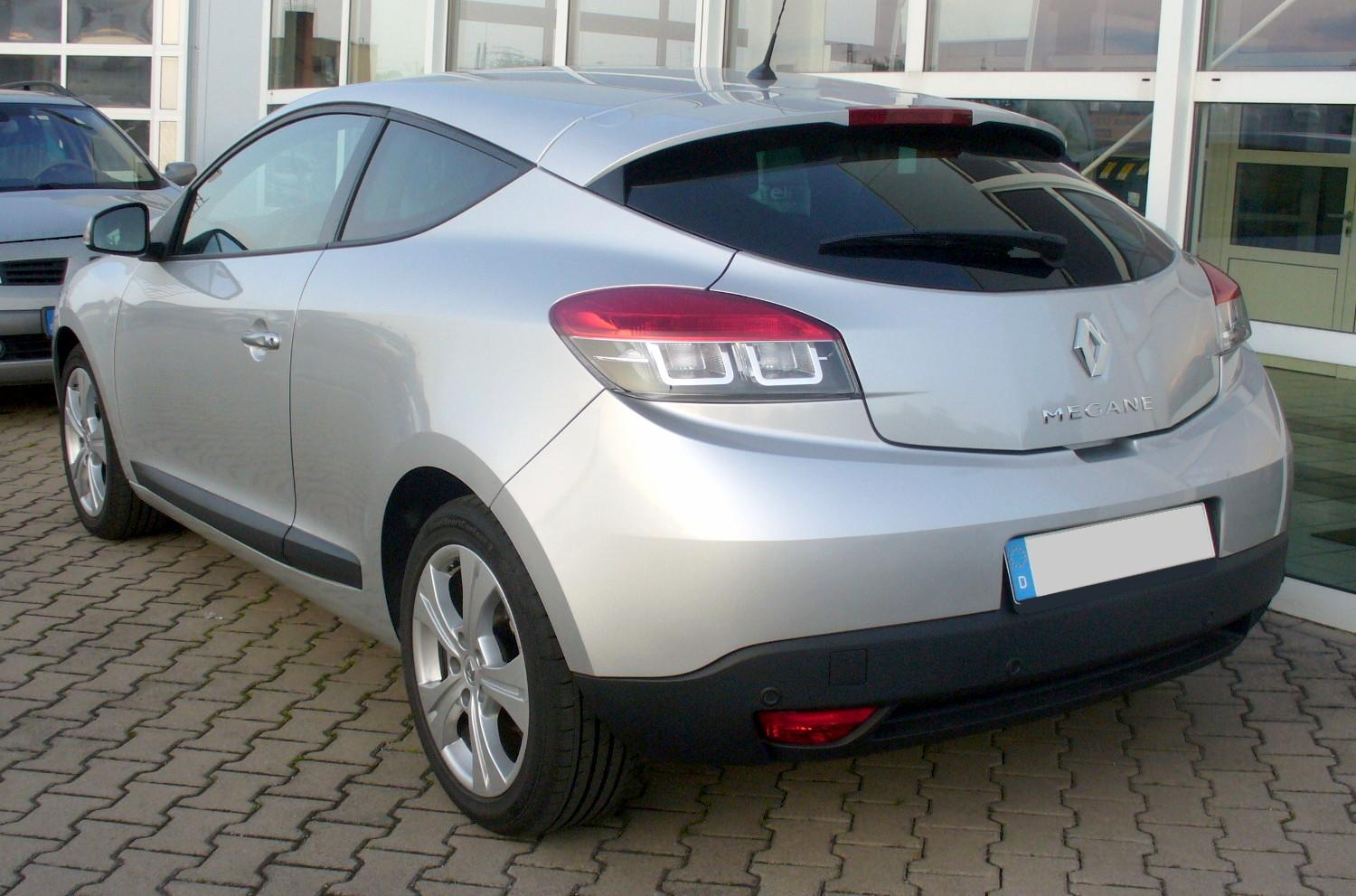
Coupé (pre-facelift)

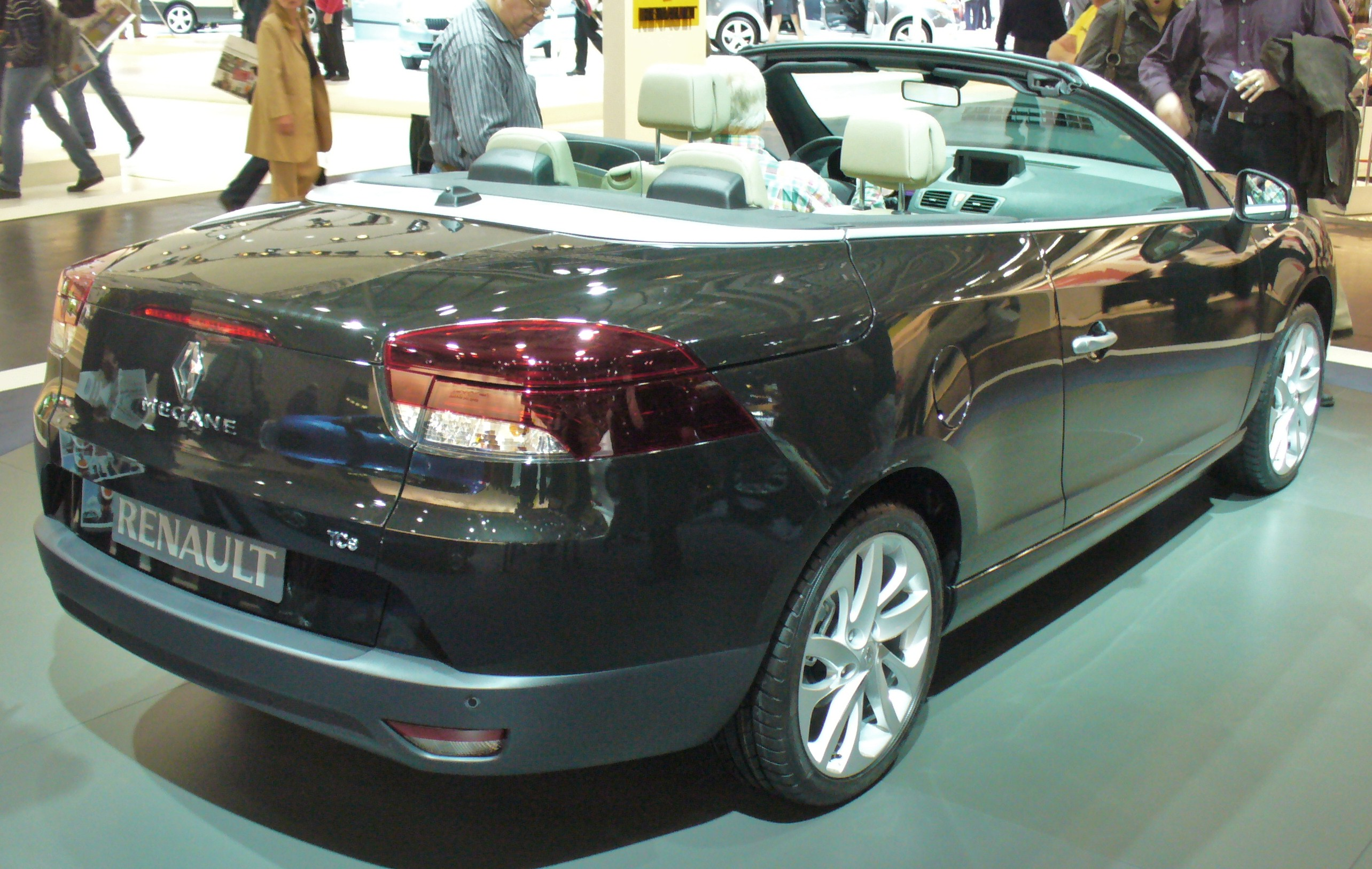
CC (pre-facelift)

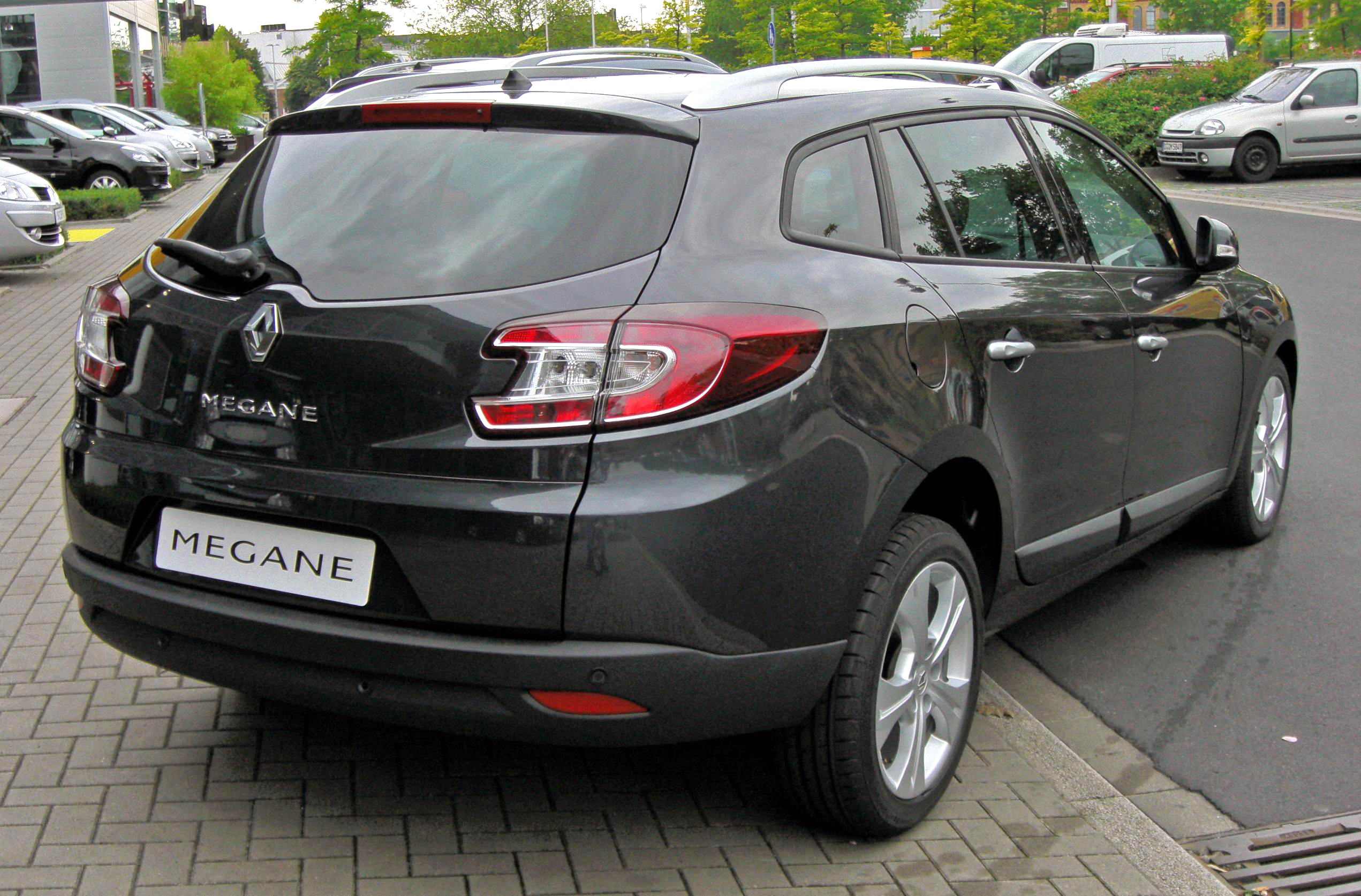
Grand Tourer (pre facelift)

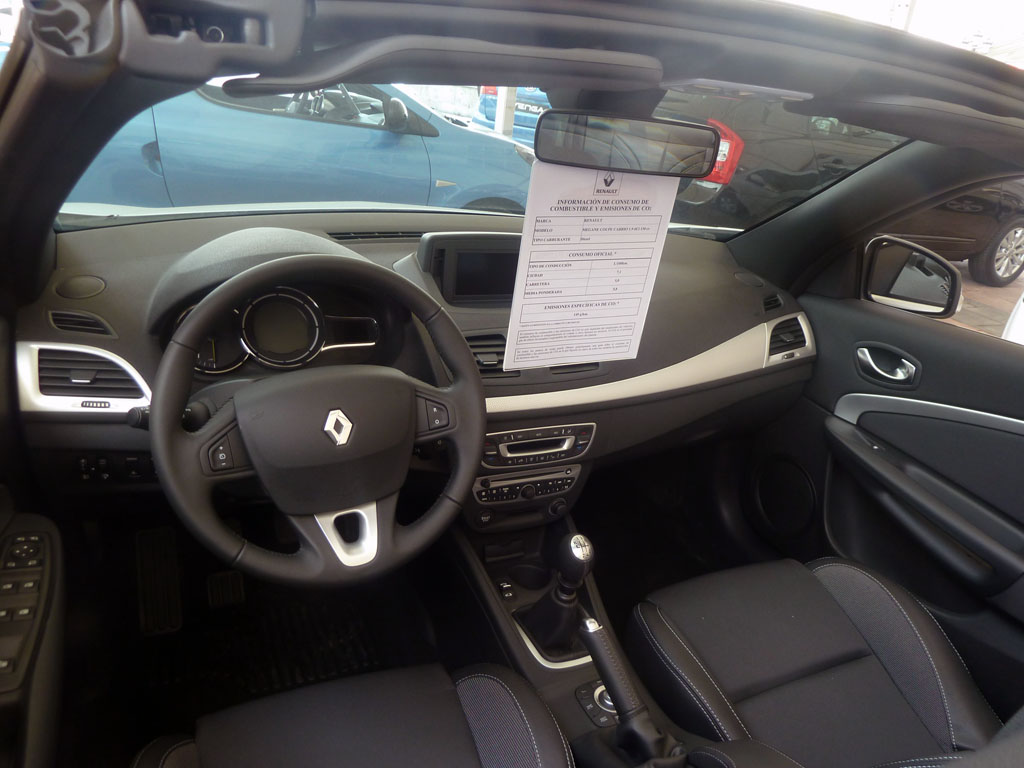
Interior

The third generation was launched in September 2008, to keep the range competitive. In October 2008, both the five door hatchback and Mégane Coupé were officially put on sale. The two models have different designs; the Coupé has a sporty design, while the five door model is more conservative.

A five-door estate version was introduced in June 2009, and was named the Sport Tourer. Another addition to the range came in the form of the Coupé Cabriolet in June 2010. That year also saw the addition of a 1.4 L turbocharged engine to the range.

Production of the Mégane's saloon derivative, the Fluence, began in Argentina in 2011, at the firm's Córdoba plant. The Mégane III was also made available for sale in Argentina that year, but was produced in Turkey, and imported into the country. In Brazil, the Fluence replaced the Mégane in Renault's lineup from 2011 onwards.

=== First facelift ===
The Mégane III underwent its first facelift in January 2012, which also introduced three new engines; a 1.2 L turbocharged petrol engine, a new 110 hp (112 PS; 82 kW) version of the 1.5 L dCi engine, and a new 1.6 L dCi engine.

=== Second facelift ===
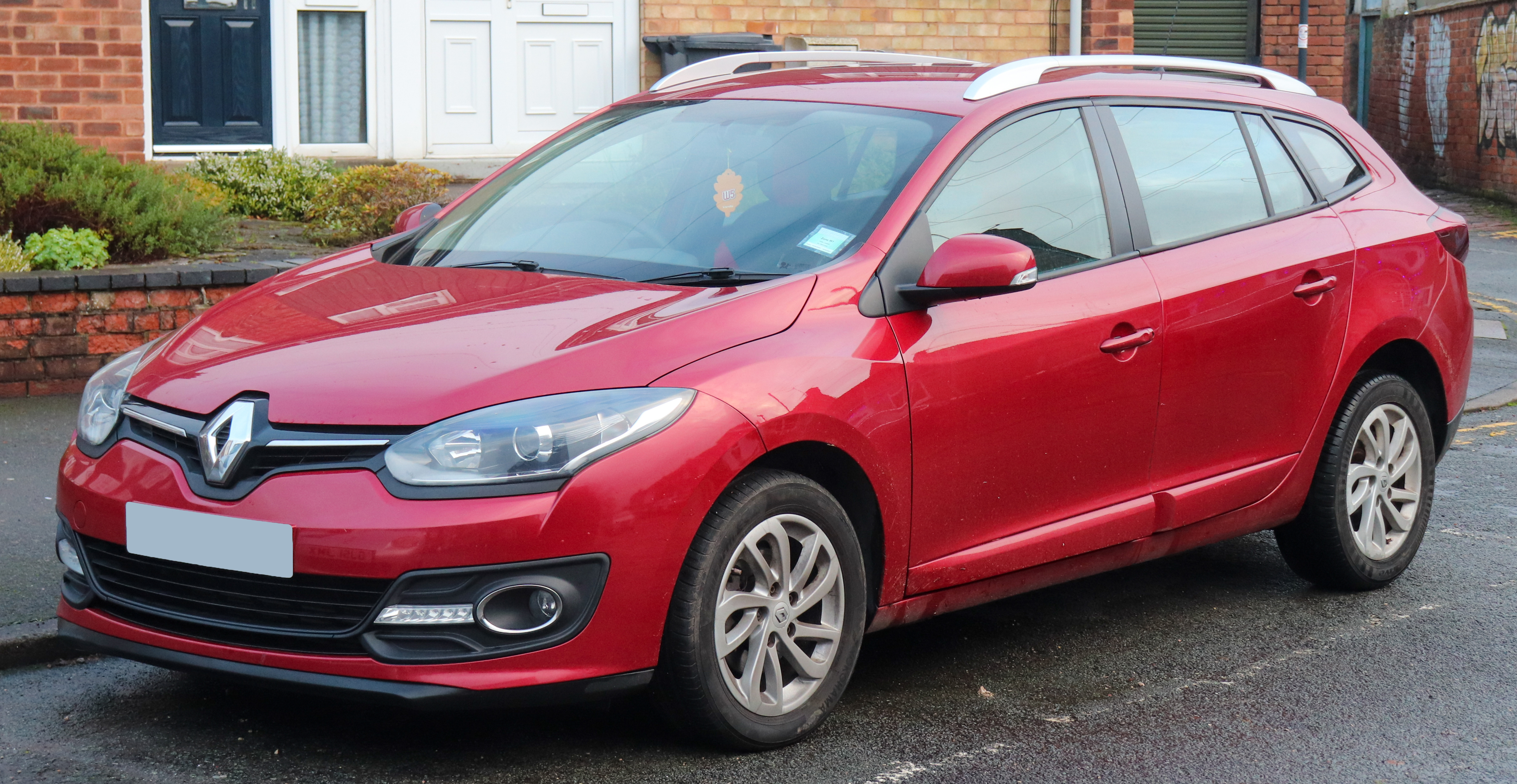

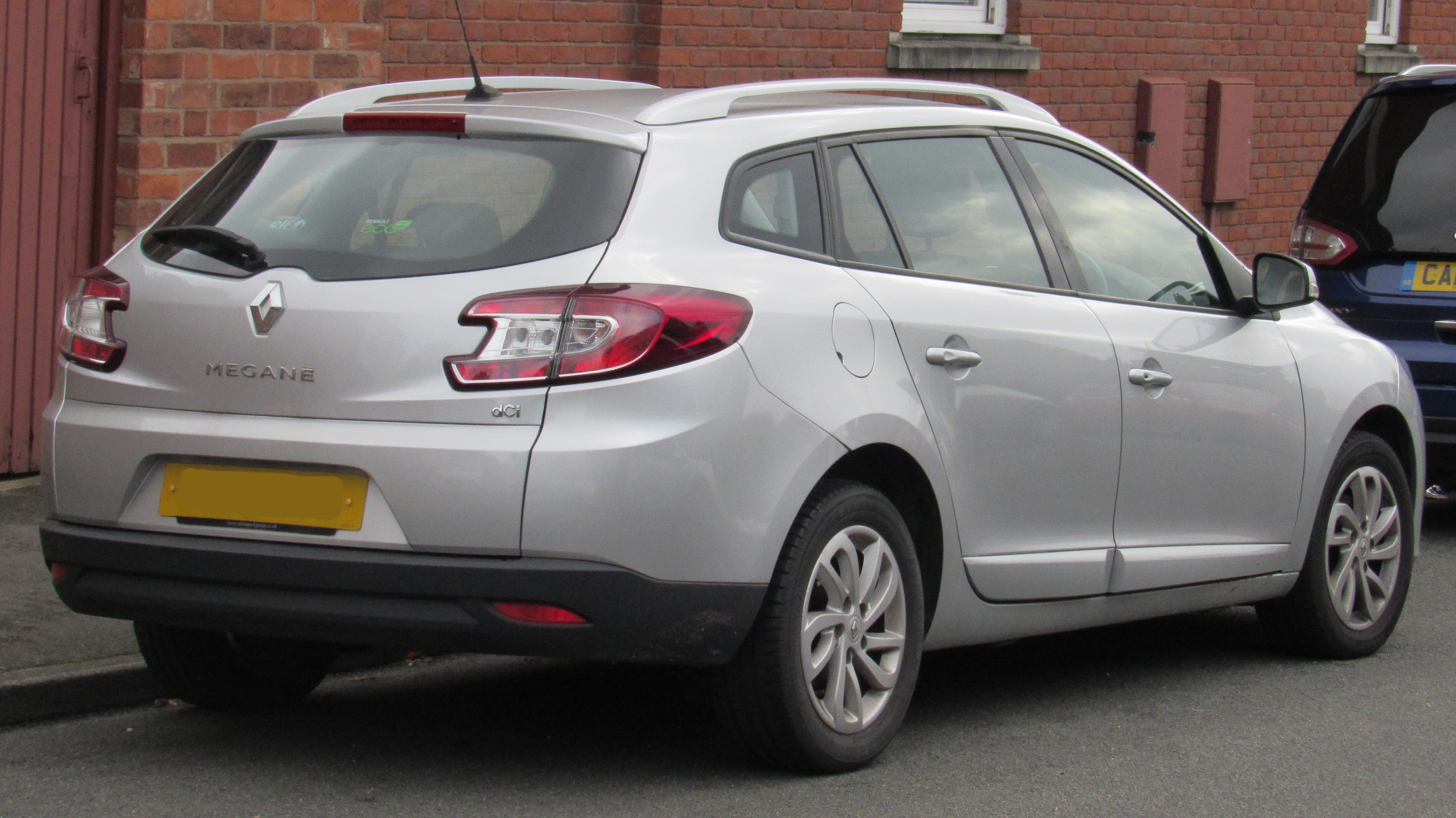
Second facelift Renault Mégane Estate

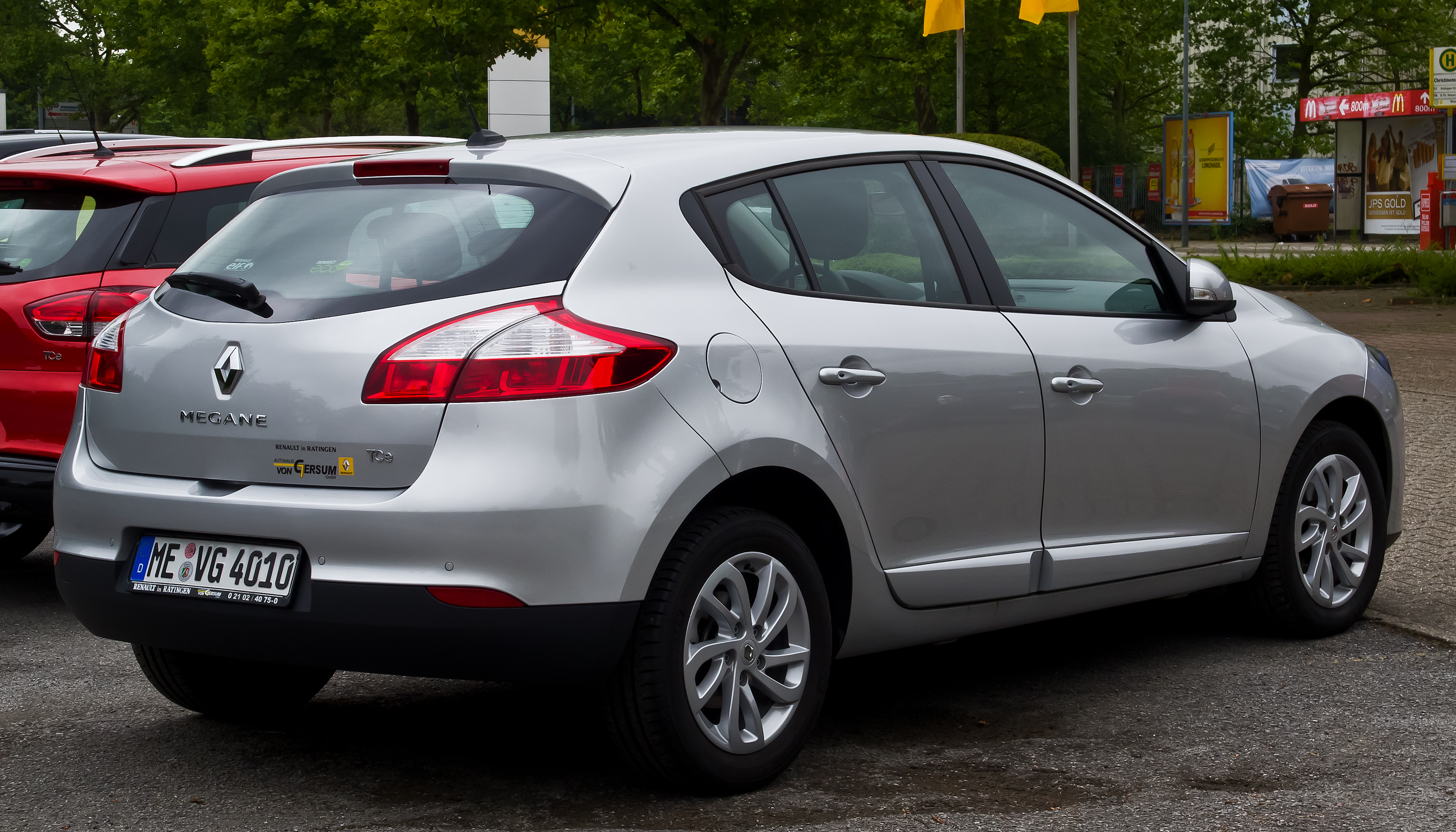
Second facelift Renault Mégane Hatchback

Another facelift followed for 2014, with a more powerful 128 hp (130 PS; 95 kW) version of the 1.2 L turbocharged engine going on sale, whilst the styling of the hatchback, coupé and estate versions was updated to match Renault's new model range.

Later that year, a 220 PS (162 kW; 217 hp) version of the 2.0 L turbocharged petrol engine was added to the range.

Higher specification Mégane models feature the same 2.0 dCi engine as the Mégane II. After 2015, the 2.0 dCi was no longer offered.

=== Turkish / Russian production (B32) ===
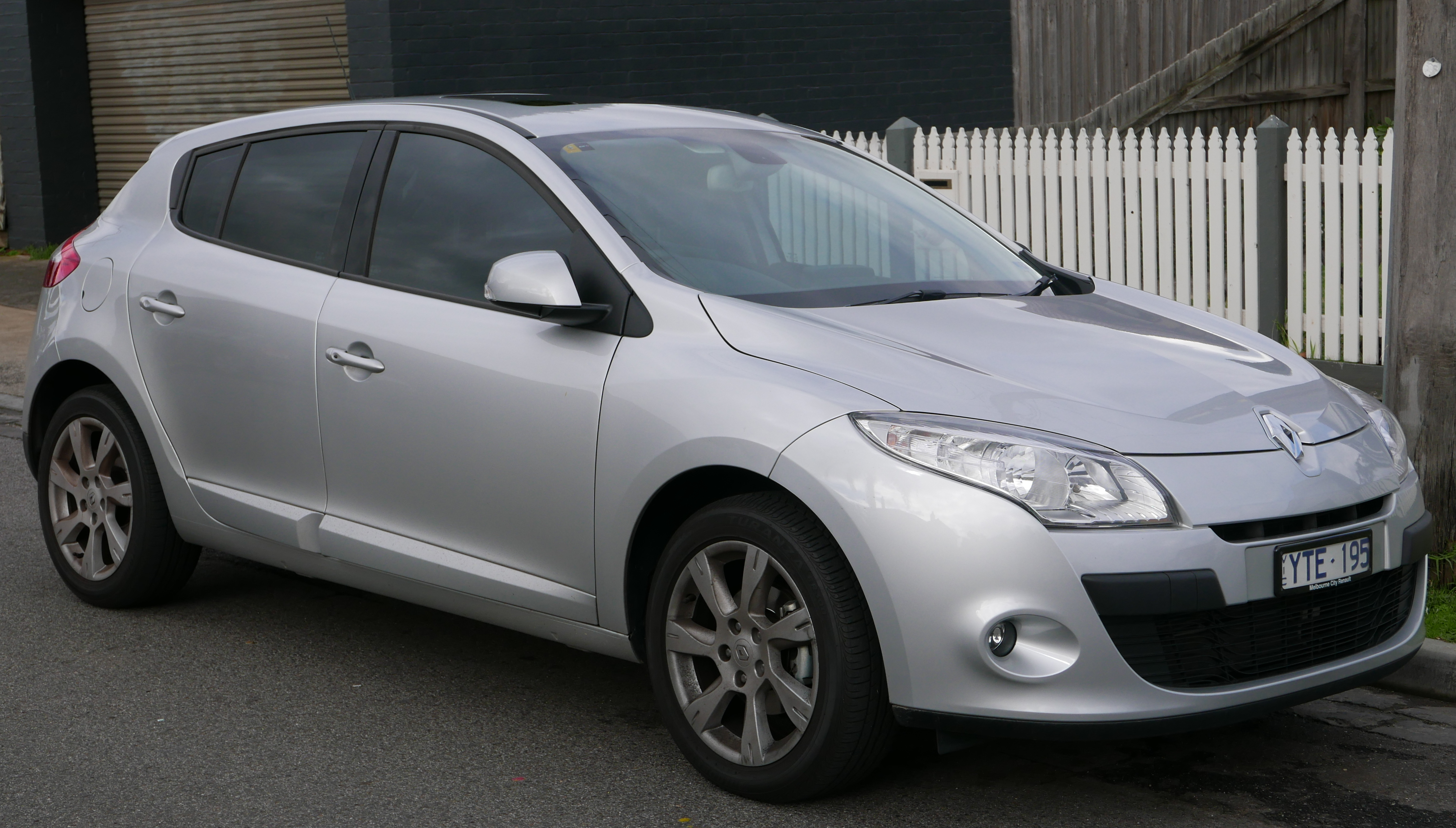
Turkish-made Mégane III, notice the weather strips on the roof

Mégane III models produced in Turkey and Russia have visual and equipment differences due to cost cutting and factory equipment differences. For example, there are weather strips on the roof to cover the welds, whereas Spanish-built models have laser welds on the roof. Turkish and Russian models can only have a sunroof as an option, while Spanish models can only have a glass roof as an option. On Turkish and Russian models, the spare tyre is located under the vehicle rather than inside the trunk. The ride height is higher on Turkish and Russian models, adapted for the worse road conditions in countries like Turkey, Russia or Australia. Only 1.5 diesel and 1.6 petrol engines were offered on Turkish and Russian built models. These cars were only offered in select Eastern European countries and in the UK. They were marketed as the Renault Mégane Generation in some countries. There was no digital dash on Turkish-made pre-facelift models; the dashboard on Turkish-built examples also has a different silver trim piece and different air vents, different gauge clusters, different stalks, and the base models have no analog fuel and temperature gauges.

This version of the Mégane was developed by Renault Korea and is based on the Renault Fluence/Renault Samsung SM3.

In late 2010 Australia received the B32 Megane 5-door hatchback from Turkey. Initially only the two-litre petrol (M4R) engine with a CVT was available. Higher specified cars came with GPS, digital dash, leather interior, auto headlights, auto wipers, and 17-inch alloy wheels. In 2011, the 1.5 dCi (K9K) with EDC gearbox version was added. In mid-2013, the Australian 5-door hatch models shifted to Spanish-built cars (B95).

=== Mégane GT Line ===
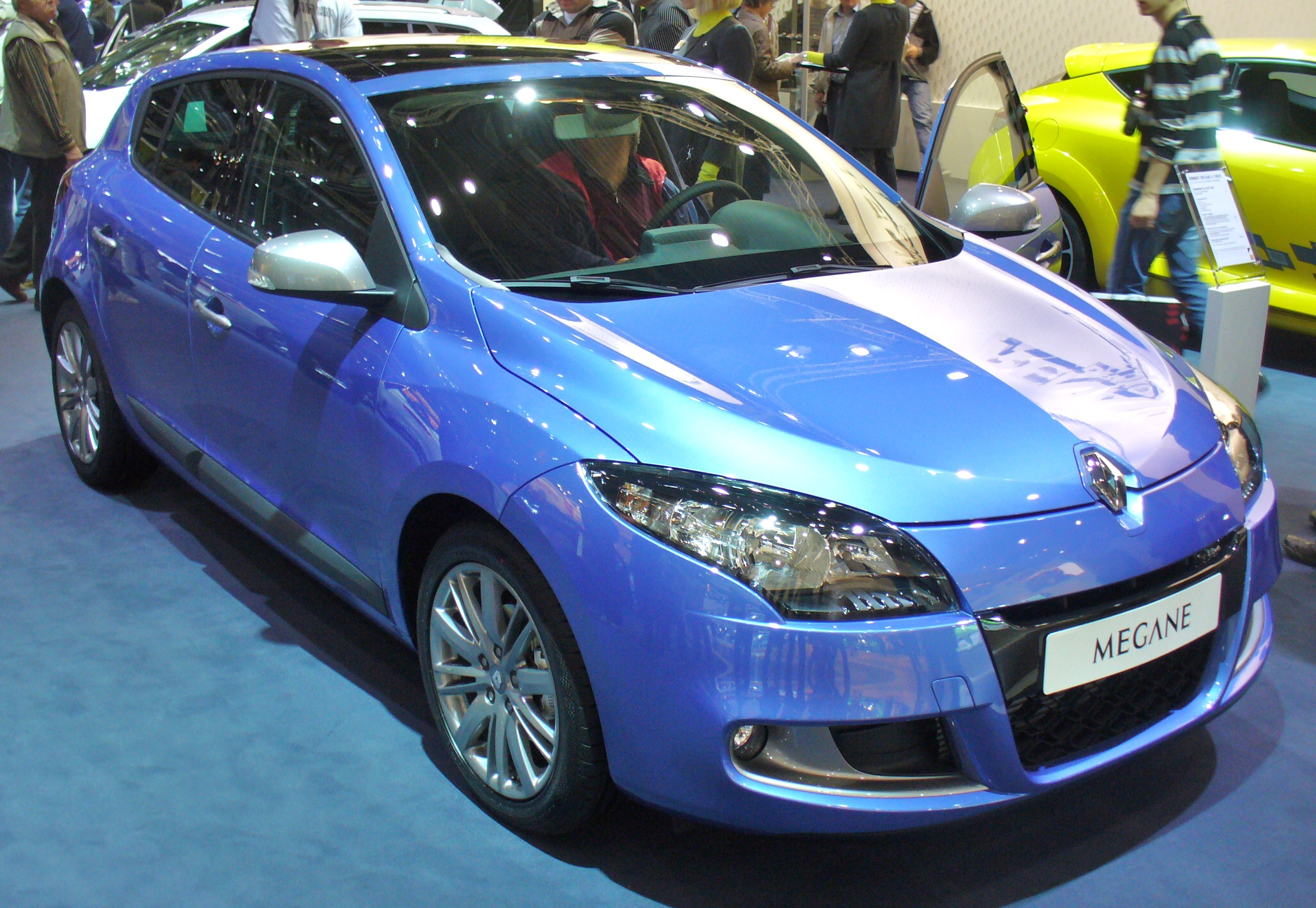
Renault Mégane GT Line (pre-facelift)

The Mégane GT Line is a sporty trim level that is equipped, among other things, with a sports suspension and unique blue paint.

=== Special editions ===
Mégane Olympic

The Mégane Olympic is a special edition launched in August 2012 on the occasion of the London 2012 Olympic Games.

Mégane Coupé Cabriolet Floride

The Mégane Coupe Cabriolet Floride was a special edition convertible in ivory with red and ivory two-tone interior, intended as a tribute to 1960s chic – the name is a reference to the Renault Floride of that era.

=== Engines ===
Petrol engine
Model	Displacement	Type code	Power	Torque	Top speed	0–100 km/h (0–62 mph) (s)
1.2 TCe 115 Stop & Start	1,198 cc (73.1 cu in)	H5Ft	115 PS (113 hp; 85 kW) @ 4500 rpm	190 N⋅m (140 lb⋅ft) @ 2000 rpm	190 km/h (118 mph)	10.9
1.2 TCe 130 Stop & Start	1,198 cc (73.1 cu in)	H5Ft	130 PS (128 hp; 96 kW) @ 5500 rpm	205 N⋅m (151 lb⋅ft) @ 2000 rpm	200 km/h (124 mph)	9.6
1.4 TCe 130	1,397 cc (85.3 cu in)	H4Jt	130 PS (128 hp; 96 kW) @ 5500 rpm	190 N⋅m (140 lb⋅ft) @ 2250 rpm	200 km/h (124 mph)	9.6
1.6 VVT 100	1,598 cc (97.5 cu in)	K4M	100 PS (99 hp; 74 kW) @ 5500 rpm	148 N⋅m (109 lb⋅ft) @ 4250 rpm	190 km/h (118 mph)	10.9
1.6 VVT 110	1,598 cc (97.5 cu in)	K4M	112 PS (110 hp; 82 kW) @ 6000 rpm	151 N⋅m (111 lb⋅ft) @ 4250 rpm	195 km/h (121 mph)	10.5
1.6 112 CVT	1,598 cc (97.5 cu in)	H4M	114 PS (112 hp; 84 kW) @ 6000 rpm	152 N⋅m (112 lb⋅ft) @ 4250 rpm	210 km/h (130 mph)	11.0
2.0 16v CVT	1,997 cc (121.9 cu in)	M4R	143 PS (141 hp; 105 kW) @ 6000 rpm	195 N⋅m (144 lb⋅ft) @ 3750 rpm	195 km/h (121 mph)	10.3
2.0 TCe 180	1,998 cc (121.9 cu in)	F4RT	180 PS (178 hp; 132 kW) @ 5500 rpm	300 N⋅m (221 lb⋅ft) @ 2250 rpm	230 km/h (143 mph)	7.8
2.0 TCe 220	1,998 cc (121.9 cu in)	F4RT	220 PS (217 hp; 162 kW) @ 5500 rpm	340 N⋅m (251 lb⋅ft) @ 2400 rpm	240 km/h (149 mph)	7.6
2.0 Turbo RS 250	1,998 cc (121.9 cu in)	F4RT	250 PS (247 hp; 184 kW) @ 5500 rpm	340 N⋅m (251 lb⋅ft) @ 3000 rpm	250 km/h (155 mph)	6.1
2.0 Turbo RS 265	1,998 cc (121.9 cu in)	F4RT	265 PS (261 hp; 195 kW) @ 5500 rpm	360 N⋅m (266 lb⋅ft) @ 3000 rpm	255 km/h (158 mph)	6.0
2.0 Turbo RS 275	1,998 cc (121.9 cu in)	F4RT	273 PS (269 hp; 201 kW) @ 5500 rpm	360 N⋅m (266 lb⋅ft) @ 3000 rpm	255 km/h (158 mph)	6.0
2.0 Turbo RS 275 Trophy-R	1,998 cc (121.9 cu in)	F4RT	273 PS (269 hp; 201 kW) @ 5500 rpm	360 N⋅m (266 lb⋅ft) @ 3000 rpm	255 km/h (158 mph)	5.8
Diesel engine
1.5 dCi 85	1,461 cc (89.2 cu in)	K9K	85 PS (84 hp; 63 kW) @ 3750 rpm	200 N⋅m (148 lb⋅ft) @ 1750 rpm	175 km/h (109 mph)	12.9
1.5 dCi 90 FAP	1,461 cc (89.2 cu in)	K9K	90 PS (89 hp; 66 kW) @ 4000 rpm	200 N⋅m (148 lb⋅ft) @ 1750 rpm	180 km/h (112 mph)	12.5
1.5 dCi 105	1,461 cc (89.2 cu in)	K9K	105 PS (104 hp; 77 kW) @ 4000 rpm	240 N⋅m (177 lb⋅ft) @ 1750 rpm	190 km/h (118 mph)	10.9
1.5 dCi 110 FAP	1,461 cc (89.2 cu in)	K9K	110 PS (108 hp; 81 kW) @ 4000 rpm	240 N⋅m (177 lb⋅ft) @ 1750 rpm	190 km/h (118 mph)	12.3
1.5 Energy dCi 110	1,461 cc (89.2 cu in)	K9K	110 PS (108 hp; 81 kW) @ 4000 rpm	260 N⋅m (192 lb⋅ft) @ 1750 rpm	190 km/h (118 mph)	12.1
1.6 dCi 130 FAP Stop & Start	1,598 cc (97.5 cu in)	R9M	130 PS (128 hp; 96 kW) @ 4000 rpm	320 N⋅m (236 lb⋅ft) @ 1750 rpm	200 km/h (124 mph)	9.8
1.9 dCi 130 FAP	1,870 cc (114.1 cu in)	F9Q	130 PS (128 hp; 96 kW) @ 3750 rpm	300 N⋅m (221 lb⋅ft) @ 1750 rpm	210 km/h (130 mph)	9.5
2.0 dCi 150 FAP	1,995 cc (121.7 cu in)	M9R	150 PS (148 hp; 110 kW) @ 3750 rpm	360 N⋅m (266 lb⋅ft) @ 2000 rpm	210 km/h (130 mph)	9.2
2.0 dCi 160 FAP	1,995 cc (121.7 cu in)	M9R	160 PS (158 hp; 118 kW) @ 3750 rpm	380 N⋅m (280 lb⋅ft) @ 2000 rpm	220 km/h (137 mph)	8.5

=== Safety ===
ANCAP test results* Renault Megane DCi Expression (diesel) (2011)
Test	Score
Overall	5 /5 stars
Frontal offset	15.83/16
Side impact	16/16
Pole	2/2
Seat belt reminders	2/3
Whiplash protection	Not Assessed
Pedestrian protection	Marginal
Electronic stability control	Standard

== Fourth generation (XFB; 2016) ==
Mégane IV
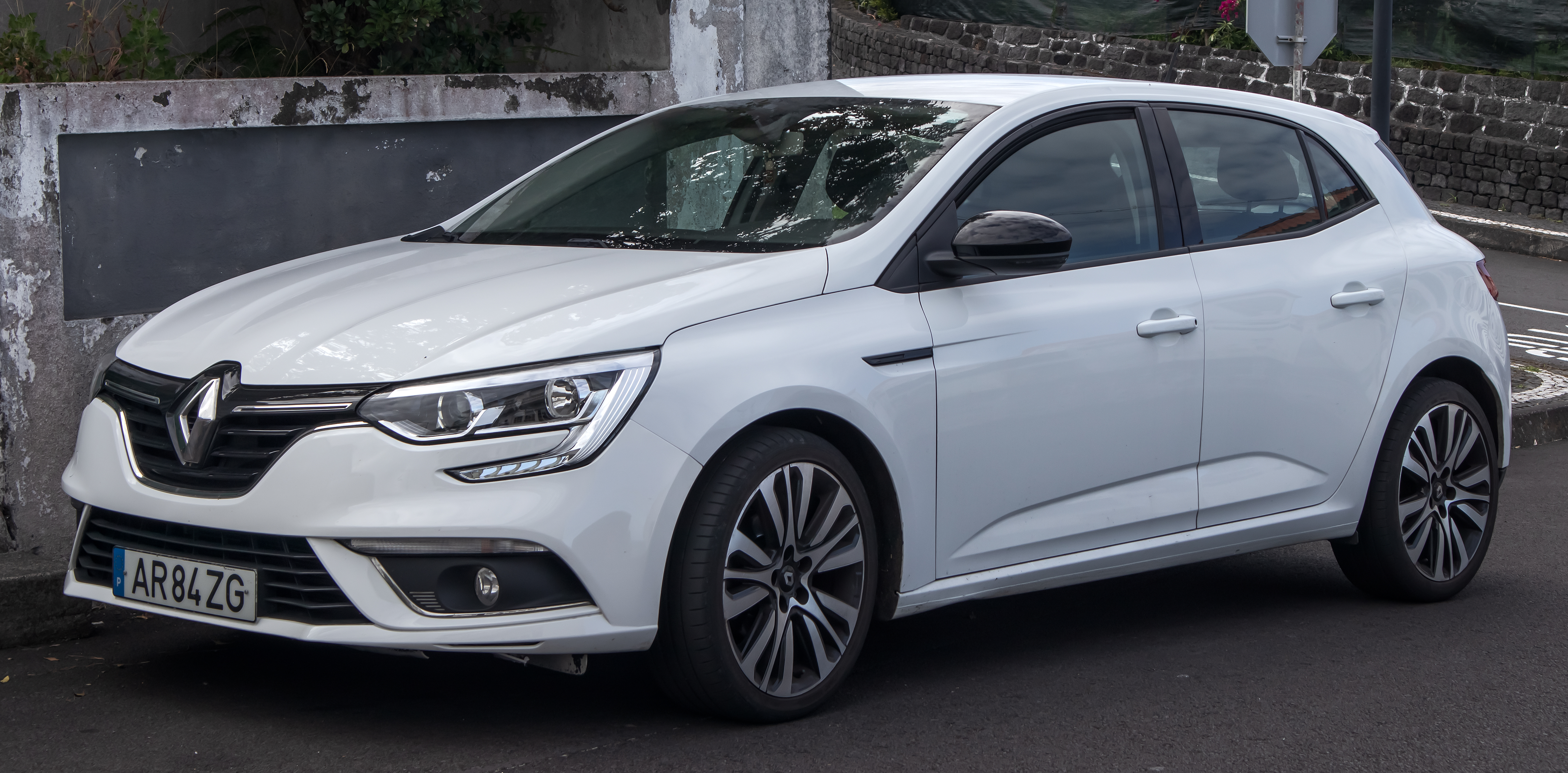

Overview
- Model code: BFB; KFB (Grandtour); LFF (saloon)
- Also called: Renault Mégane Grandcoupé (saloon) (Note: In Israel, Palestinian Authority, and Serbia.)
- Production: December 2015 – April 2024 (hatchback and estate); August 2016 – 2027 (saloon)
- Model years: 2015–2022 (United Kingdom)
- Assembly: Spain: Palencia (Renault Spain, hatchback and station wagon models only); Turkey: Bursa Province (Oyak-Renault and Karsan, sedan models only)
- Designer: Under the lead of Laurens van den Acker

Body and chassis
- Body style: 5-door hatchback 5-door estate 4-door saloon
- Platform: Renault–Nissan CMF-CD platform
- Related: Renault Scénic IV; Renault Kadjar; Renault Talisman

Powertrain
- Engine: Petrol: 1.0 L H5Dt tCe I3 turbo; 1.2 L H5Ft tCe I4 turbo; 1.3 L H5Ht tCe I4 turbo; 1.6 L H4M sCe I4; 1.6 L M5Mt tCe I4 turbo (GT); 1.8 L M5Pt tCe I4 turbo (R.S); Petrol plug-in hybrid: 1.6 L H4M tCe PHEV I4 (E-Tech); Diesel: 1.5 L K9K dCi/BluedCi turbo; 1.6 L R9M dCi turbo; 1.6 L R9M dCi biturbo (GT); 1.7 L R9N BluedCi turbo
- Electric motor: 50 kW (68 PS; 67 hp) electric motor, integrated into transmission (E-Tech)
- Transmission: 5/6-speed manual; CVT Jatco/Nissan X-Tronic; 6/7-speed EDC; 6-speed Multimode manual transmission (E-Tech)
- Hybrid drivetrain: PHEV (E-Tech)

Dimensions
- Wheelbase: 2,669 mm (105.1 in); 2,711 mm (106.7 in) (saloon)
- Length: 4,359 mm (171.6 in) (hatchback); 4,372 mm (172.1 in) (R.S); 4,626 mm (182.1 in) (Grandtour); 4,632 mm (182.4 in) (saloon)
- Width: 1,814 mm (71.4 in); 1,875 mm (73.8 in) (R.S)
- Height: 1,445–1,447 mm (56.9–57.0 in) (hatchback); 1,449 mm (57.0 in) (Grandtour); 1,443 mm (56.8 in) (saloon)
- Curb weight: 1,205–1,603 kg (2,657–3,534 lb)

Chronology
- Predecessor: Renault Fluence (saloon)

The fourth generation Mégane was launched at the September 2015 Frankfurt Motor Show, production started late 2015, with sales starting in July 2016. The vehicle is larger and based on an all-new CMF-CD platform shared with the Renault Scénic and Renault Talisman. The Mégane IV follows the latest design language, which has been seen on the Clio IV, Captur, Espace V and Talisman.

An estate version (Mégane Sport Tourer/Grandtour, codenamed KFB) was revealed at the 2016 Geneva Motor Show. The four door fastback saloon version called the Mégane Sedan later in July of the same year.

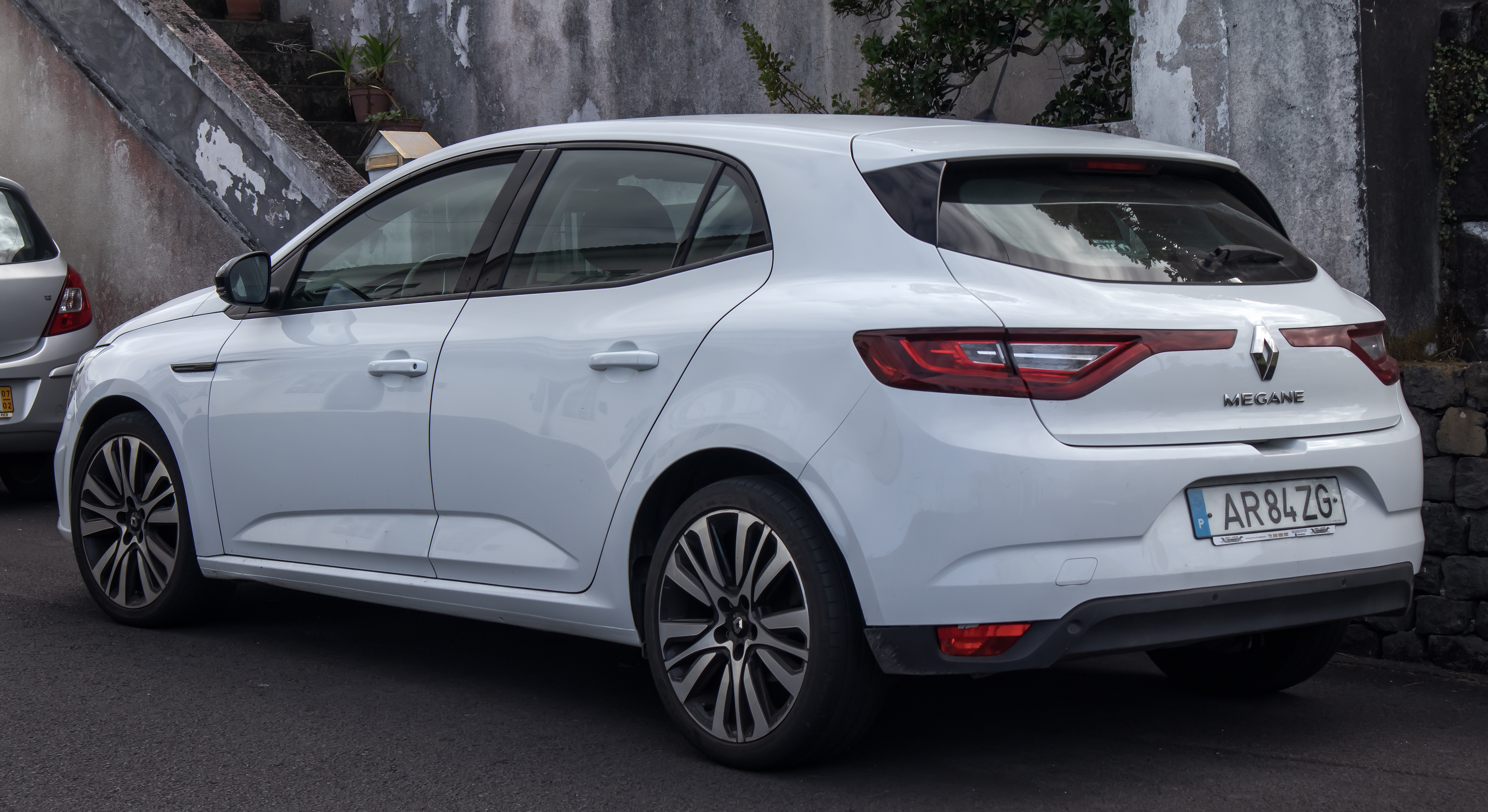
Mégane hatchback

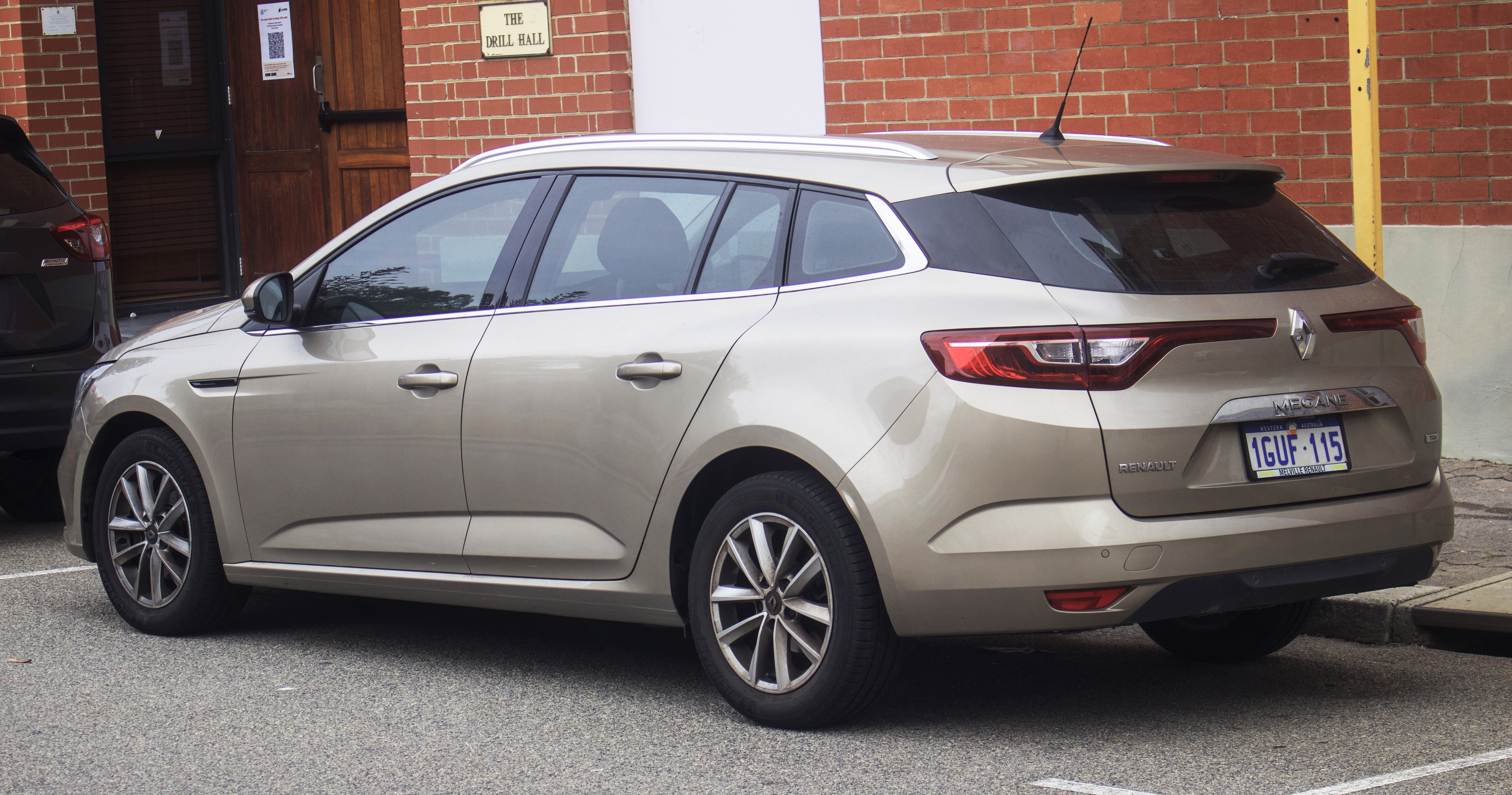
Mégane Grandtour

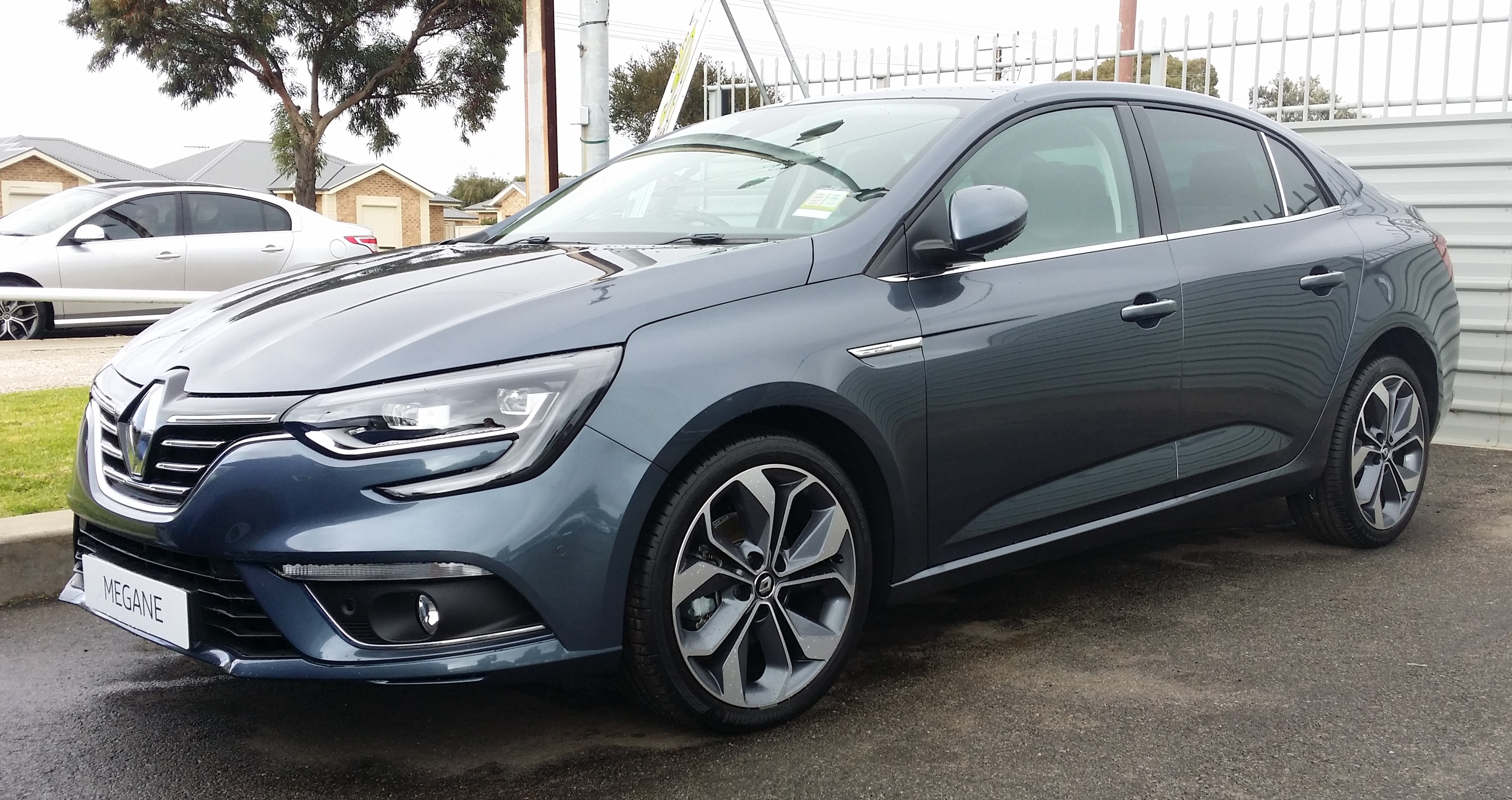
Mégane saloon

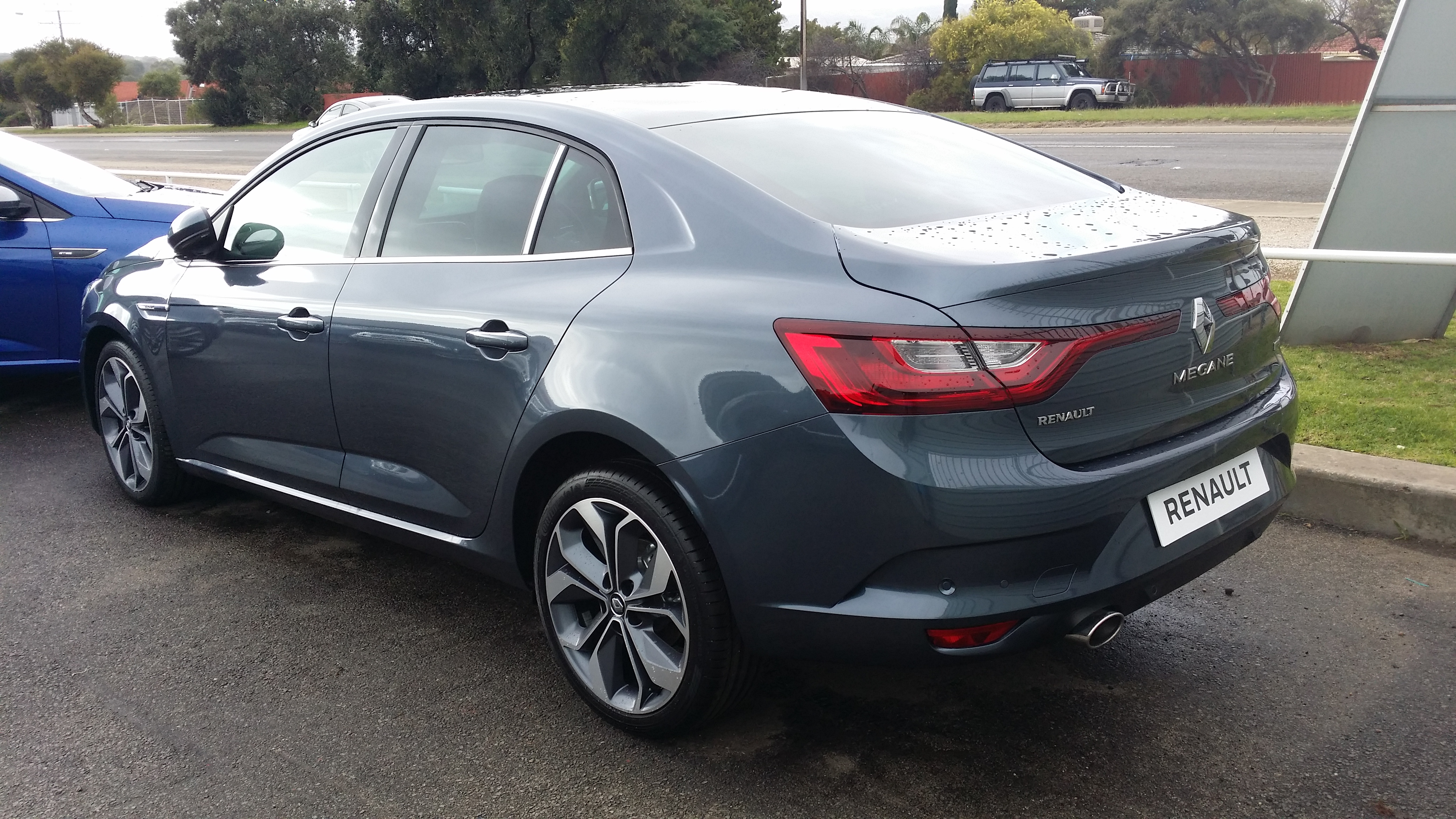
Mégane saloon

=== Technical details ===
The fourth generation Mégane is larger and lower than its predecessor. The suspension is made of MacPherson struts on the front and a torsion beam on the rear. Brakes are discs on both axles. The driver can select between five driving modes that change the car set up.

Most Mégane models have a head up display and a seven-inch screen (replaced with an 8.7-inch touchscreen in some trim levels).

Options include adaptive cruise control, automated emergency braking, lane departure warning, speed limit warning, blind spot monitoring, automatic headlights, reversing camera, parking sensors and a hands free parking system.

Speaking about the car, Renault's chief designer Laurens van den Acker said, "Renault can produce cars with a Latin skin and a German heart". It has nine engines available (four petrol and five diesel) with power outputs between 89 hp (65 kW) and 202 hp (149 kW).

=== Mégane Sedan ===
The Mégane Sedan, launched in July 2016, resembles the Talisman, but with the front section of the Mégane IV hatchback and a fastback like sloping roofline. It has more space for the rear passengers than the hatchback and a larger boot, with a claimed volume of 508 dm^{3} (17.9 cu ft).

It is sold on the African continent, the Middle East, various Eastern Asian and Australian markets. Within Europe, it is offered in several countries including Turkey, Italy, Poland, Romania, Bulgaria, Ukraine, Serbia, Greece, Georgia and Ireland, but neither France or the United Kingdom.

Depending on the market, there are two petrol engines and three diesel engines offered, with power outputs ranging from 90 to 130 bhp (67 to 97 kW). Only the mid range engine is suitable to be matched with the dual clutch six speed transmission.

=== Mégane GT ===
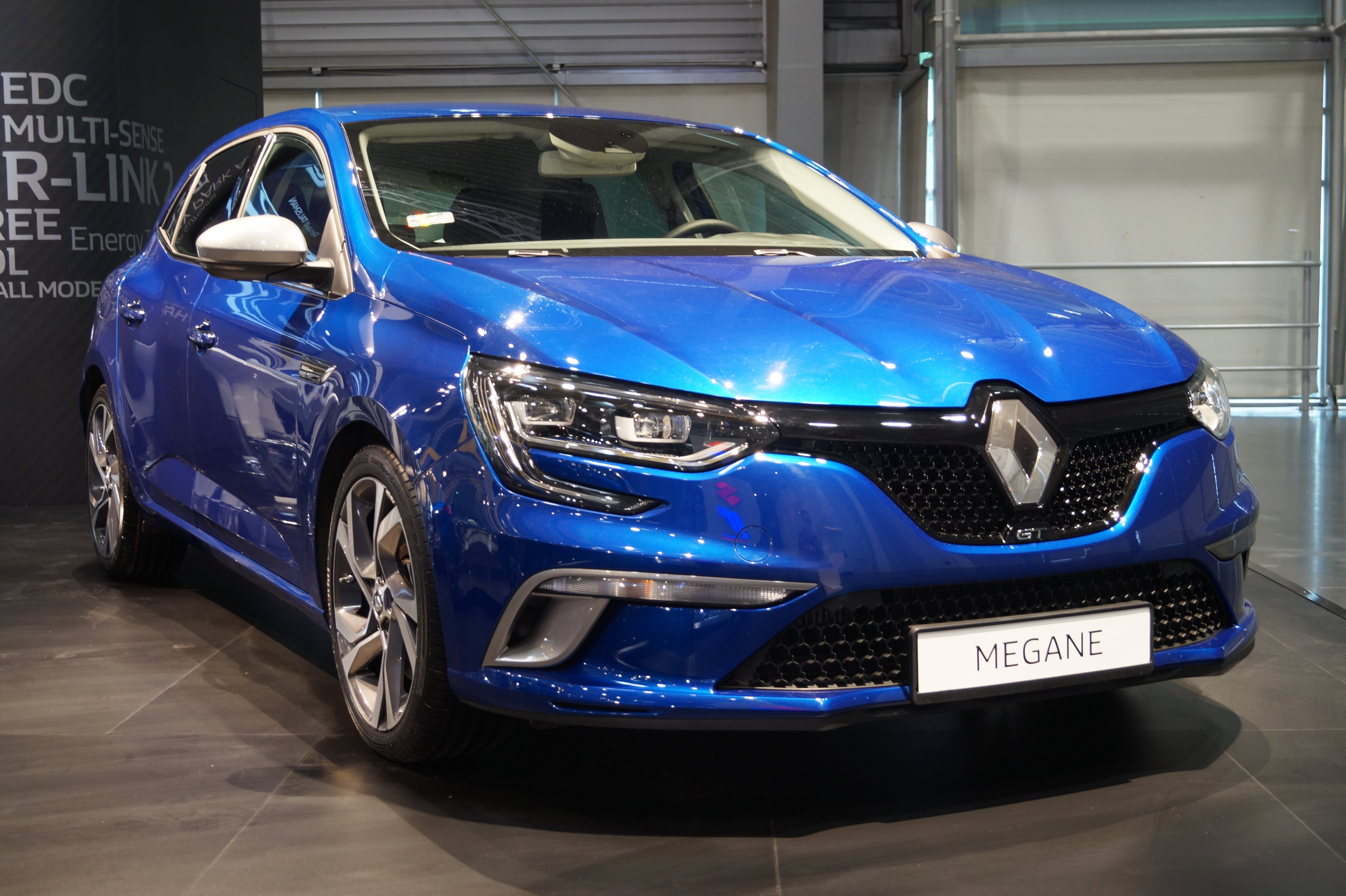
Mégane GT

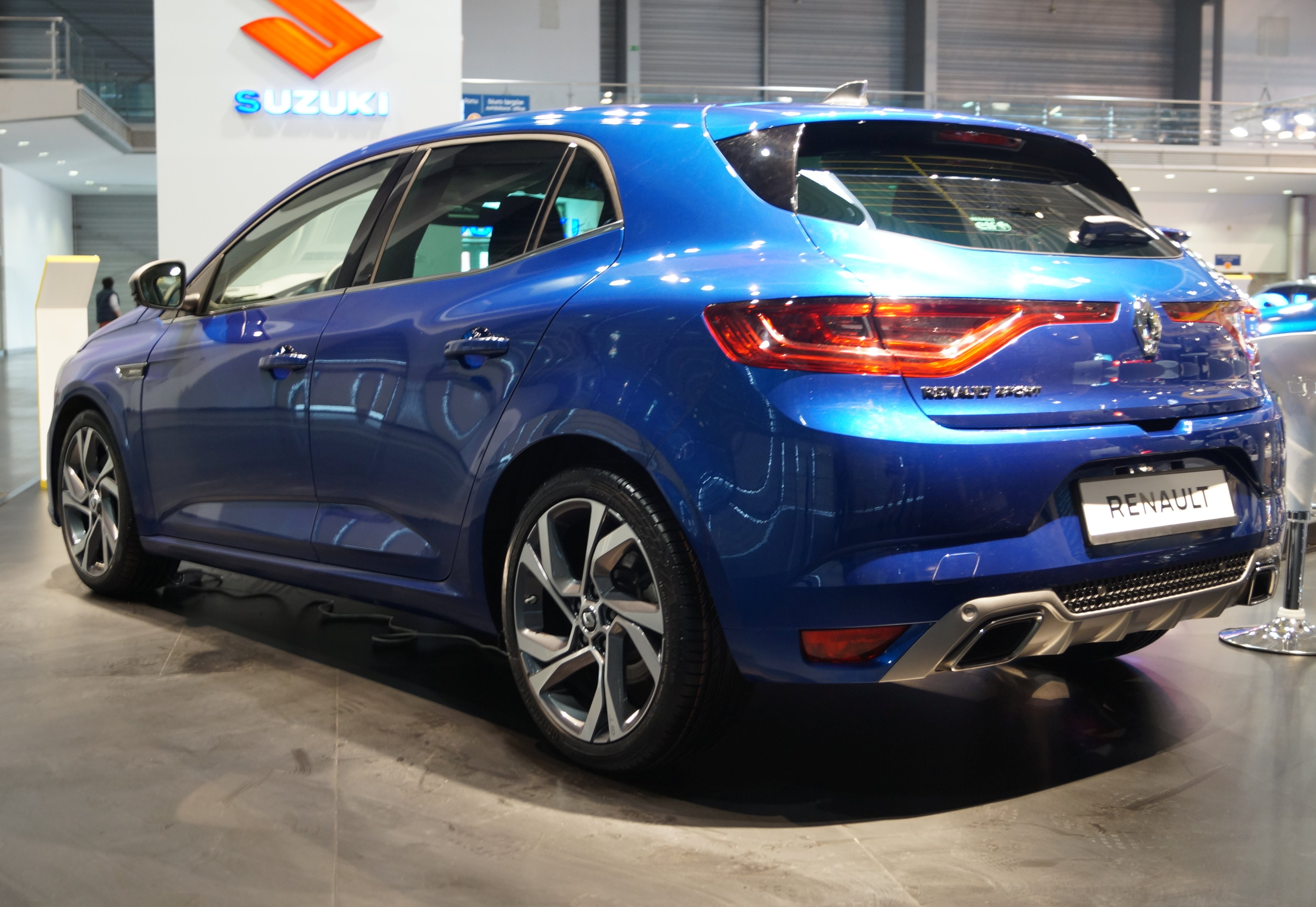
Rear view

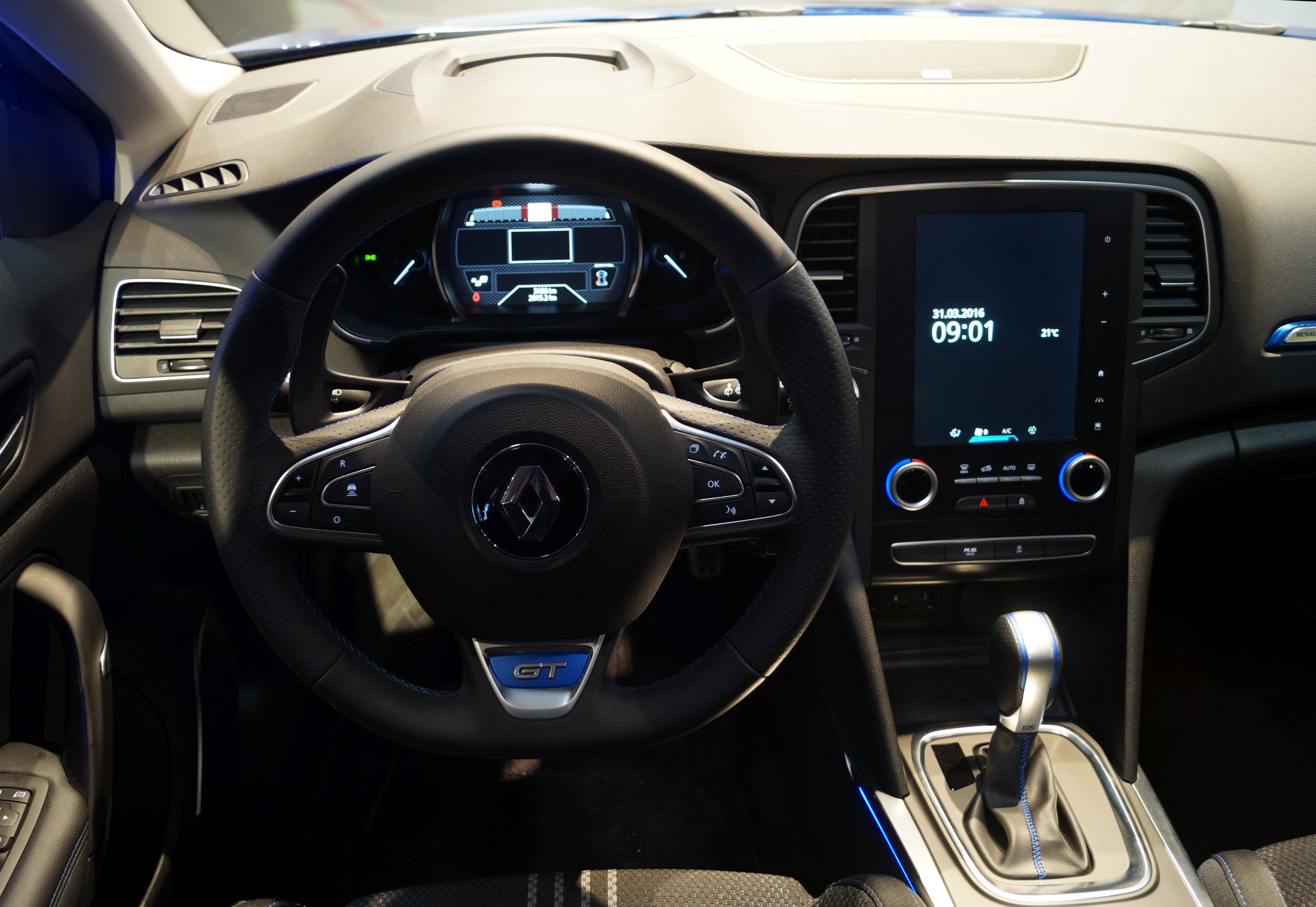
Interior

The Mégane GT is a high performance version based on the hatchback model with 1.6-litre I4 diesel and petrol powertrains. As standard, it incorporates a four-wheel steering system (4Control) and dual-clutch automatic gearbox with optional paddle shifting. It also has a slightly different design for the interior and the exterior.

=== Mégane R.S. ===
The Mégane R.S. was introduced in September 2017 and went on sale in 2018. Based on the hatchback model, it is powered by a 1.8-litre turbocharged engine developed jointly with Nissan, with tweaks made by engineers working from the Renault Formula 1 engine factory in Viry-Châtillon, France. The engine produces 280 PS (276 hp; 206 kW) and 390 N⋅m (39.8 kg⋅m; 288 lb⋅ft) torque, with an option of two transmissions, which are a six-speed manual or a six-speed dual-clutch automatic.

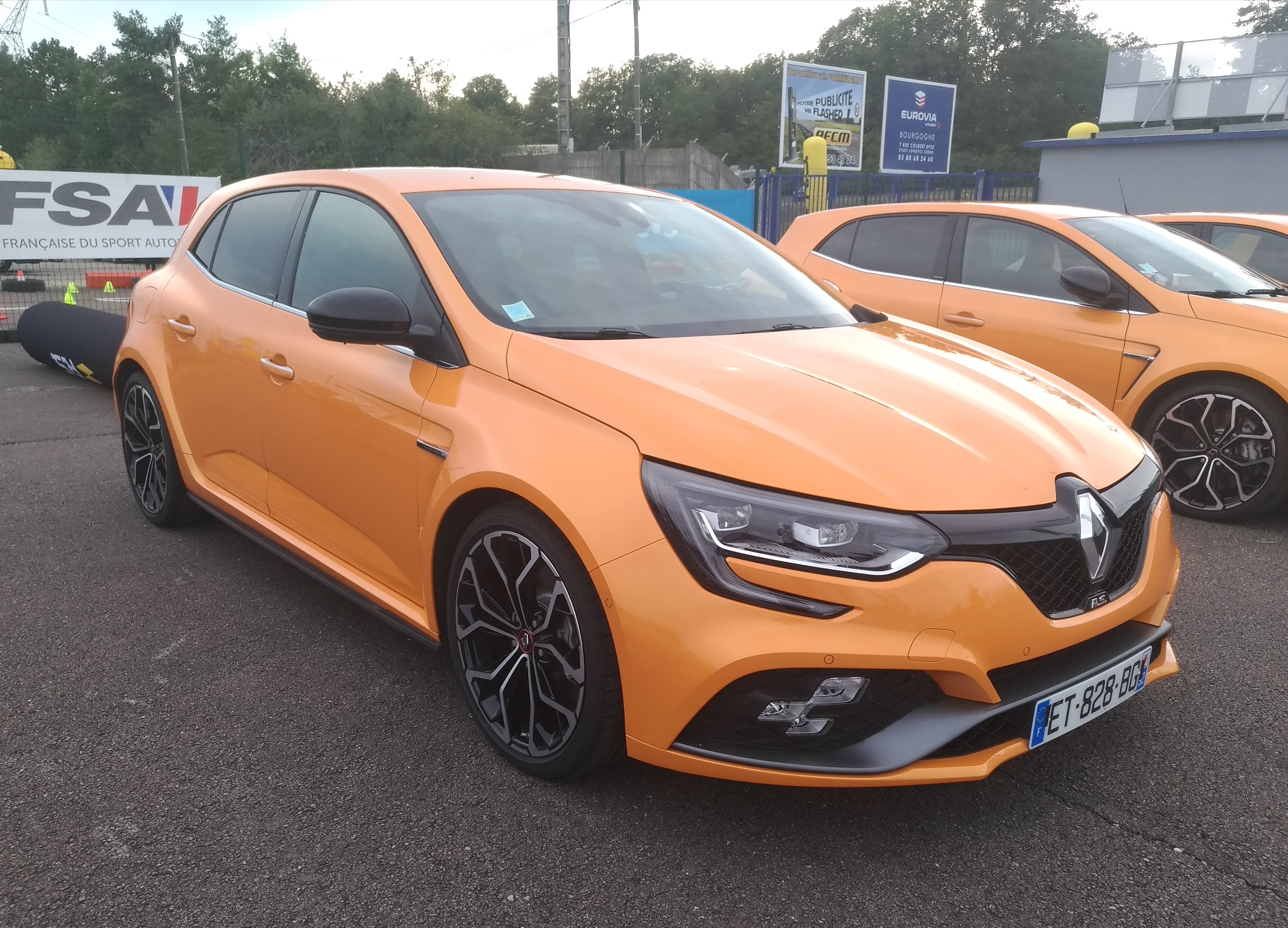
Mégane RS

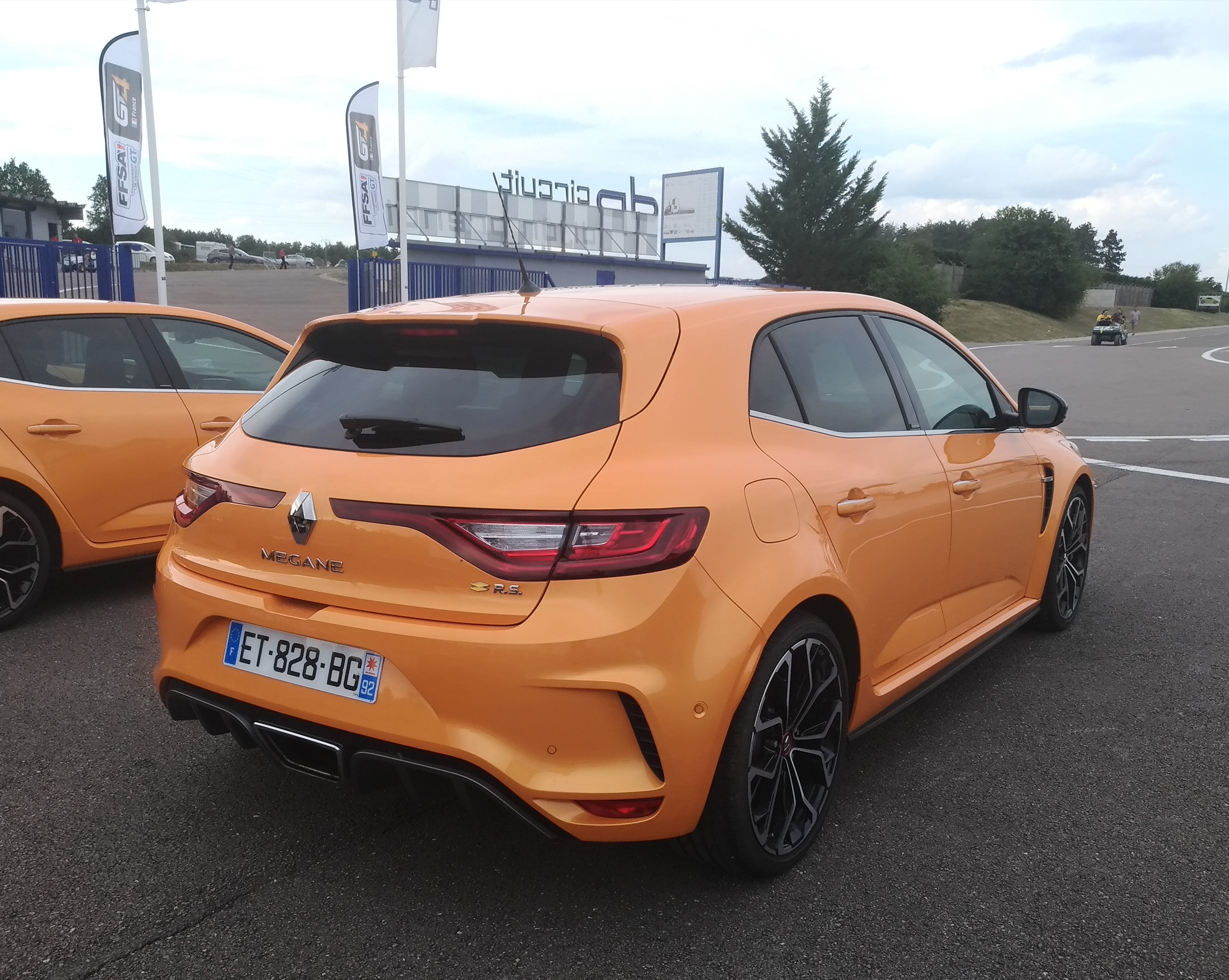
Rear view

==== Mégane RS Trophy-R ====
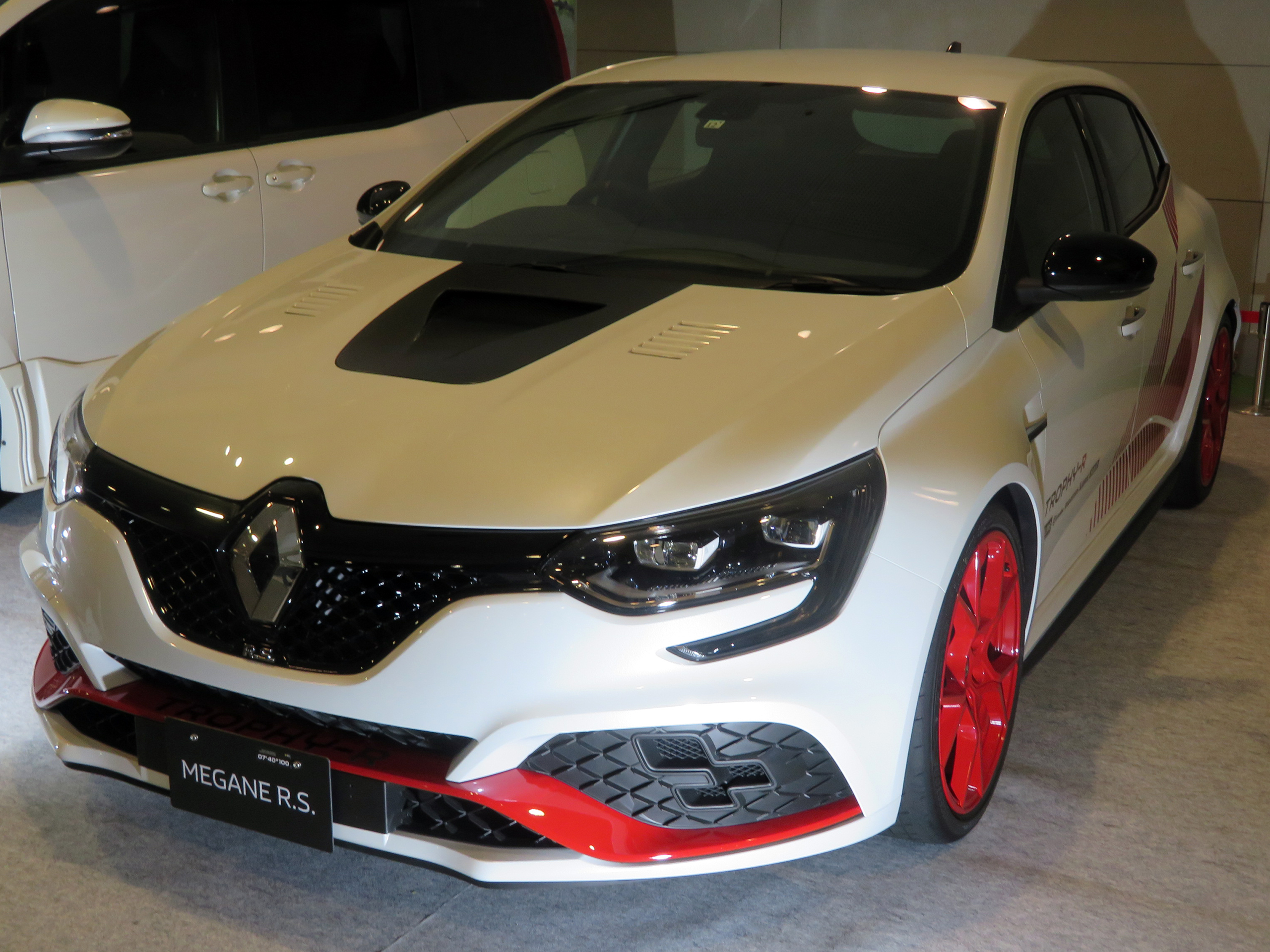
Mégane RS Trophy-R

Making its public debut on May 24, 2019, at the Monaco Formula 1 Grand Prix, the Mégane RS Trophy-R is a limited edition based on the regular Trophy.

It was designed to be the fastest front-wheel-drive vehicle to lap the Nürburgring, and as such it is 130 kg (290 lb) lighter due to the thinner glass used on the rear doors, a carbon fibre hood, the absence of rear seats combined with lighter front seats, a titanium exhaust and no rear wiper, among other things. To save even more weight, it can be fitted with an optional carbon-ceramic brake kit at the front as well as carbon rims.

==== Mégane RS Ultime ====
Announced in January 2023, the Mégane RS Ultime is a limited edition available in just 1,976 units, as a reference to the founding year of Renault Sport. All are signed by Laurent Hurgon, a test driver who has broken several lap records in the Mégane RS and was actively involved in the development of the model.

It is the last RS-badged model and made its public debut at the 2023 Tokyo Motor Show, marking the 20th anniversary of the Mégane RS series, which was first introduced in 2003.

Orders opened in March 2023 with a starting price of €53,450 (not including the green tax) in France.

=== Facelift ===
In 2020, the Mégane was refreshed with facelift, with minor changes to the exterior design, a 9.3-inch touchscreen, and a plug-in hybrid version in both estate and hatchback variants marketed as the Mégane E-Tech. It combines the 1.6-litre four-cylinder petrol engine with two electric motors for a total system output of 118 kW (160 PS; 158 bhp) and comes with a 9.8 kWh battery that allows it to run on electricity for 50 km (31 mi) and up to a top speed of 135 km/h (84 mph) in the mixed WLTP test cycle and for 65 km (40 mi) in the city.

The Mégane Sedan is facelifted in February 2021, some months after the hatchback and the estate. It receives a new 115 hp (86 kW) petrol engine. The hatchback version was discontinued in Turkey.

In June 2022, Renault launched the "E-Tech engineered" special edition for the hybrid versions of the Clio, Captur, Arkana and Mégane (hatchback and estate), with design elements inspired by the Megane E-Tech.

The production of both the hatchback and the estate models is stopped in April 2024, but the production in Turkey (saloon model) will continue until 2027. In mid-2026, Renault updated the Megane Sedan with the brand's new minimalist 'Nouvel'R' 2D logo across the front grille, tailgate, steering wheel, and wheel hubs.

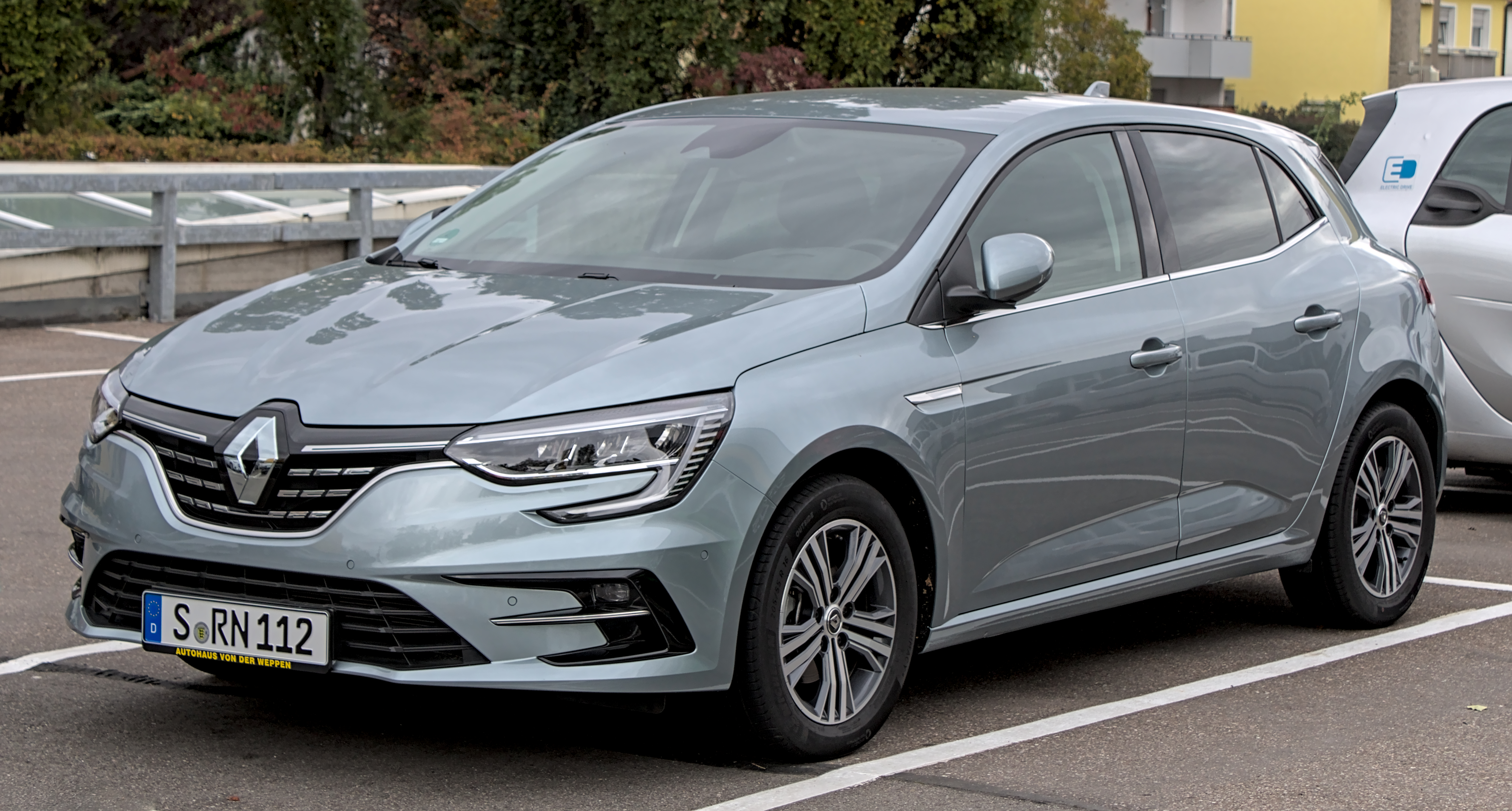
Mégane hatchback (facelift)

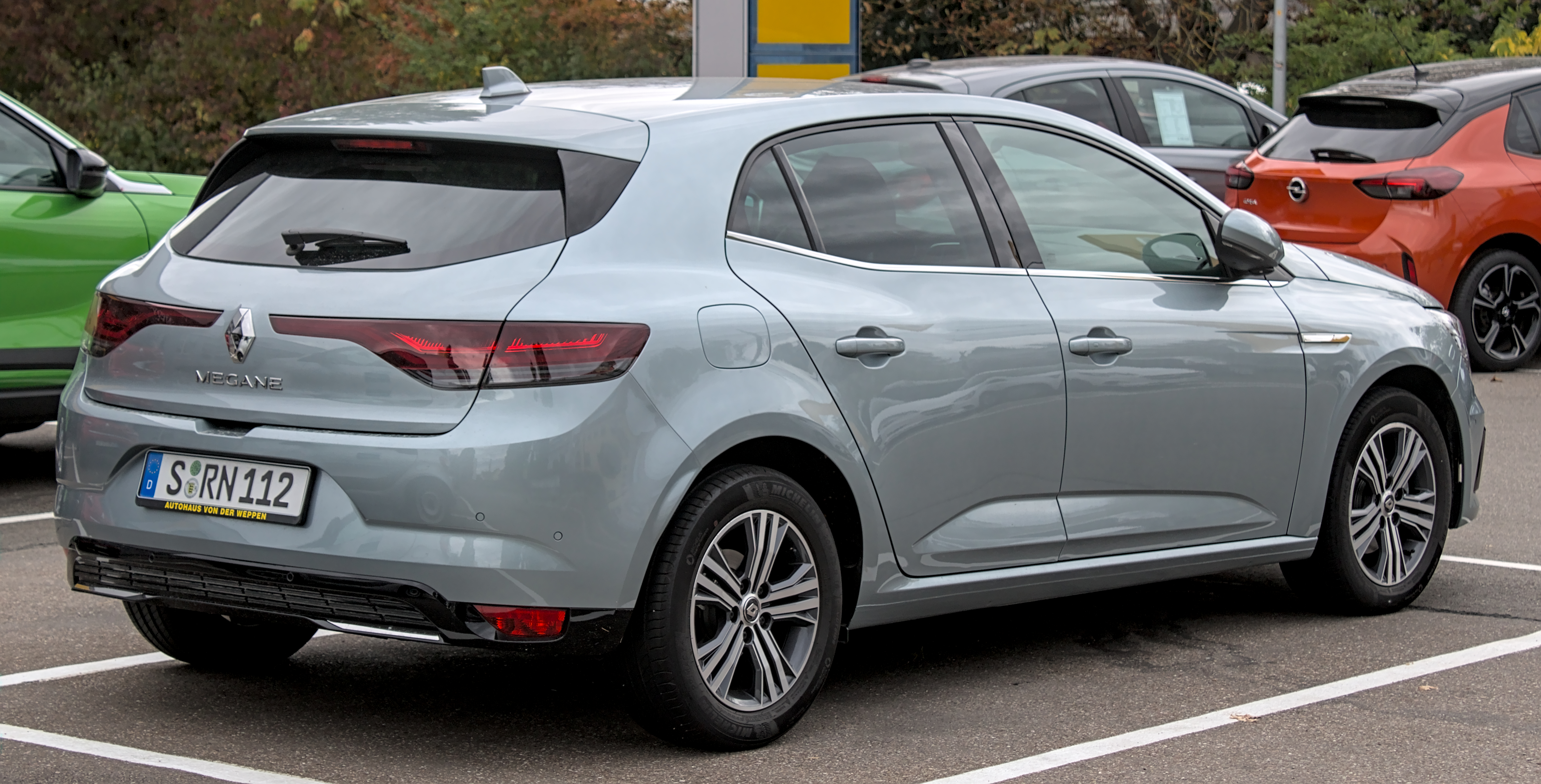
Mégane hatchback (facelift)

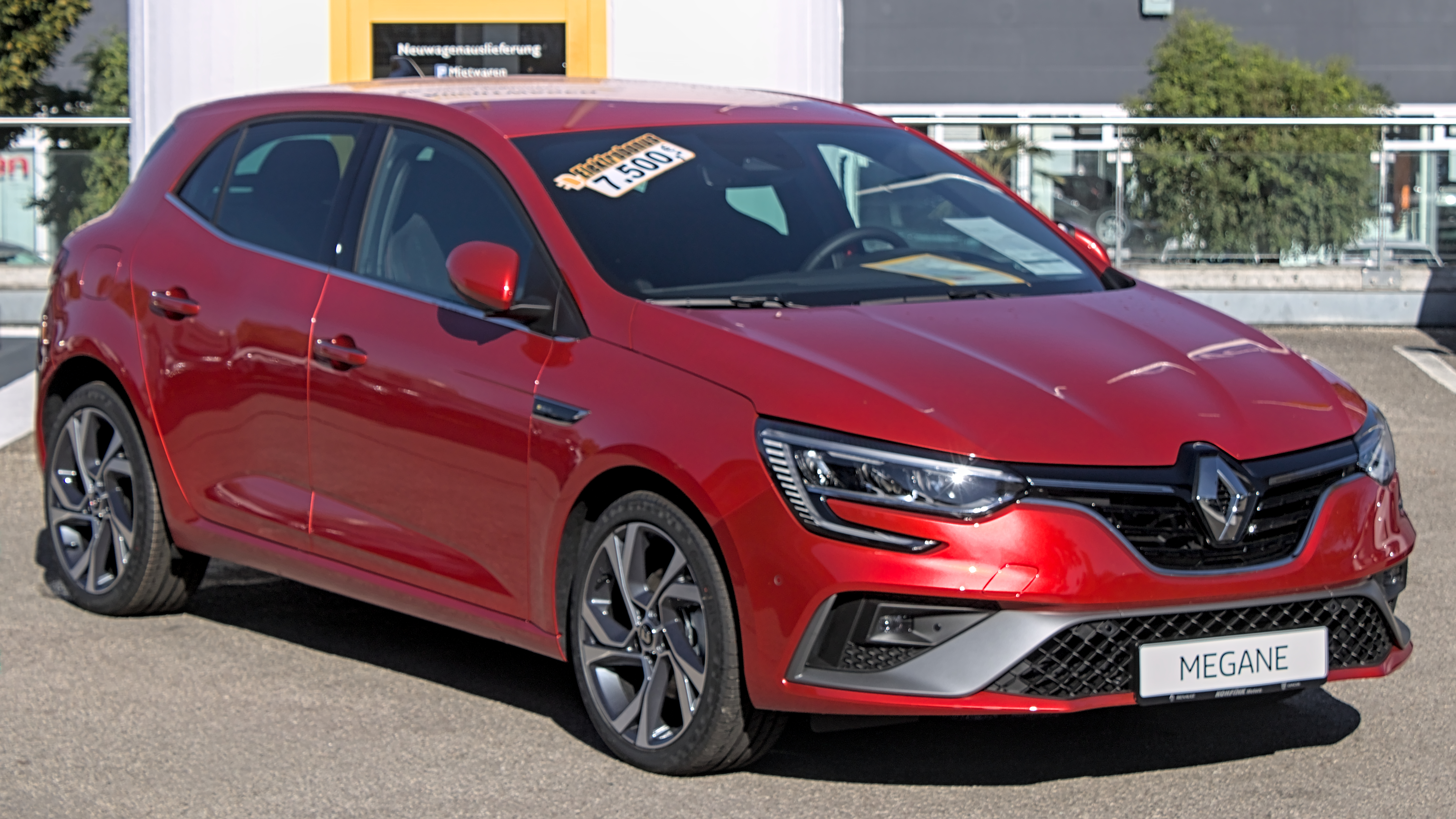
Mégane E-Tech (hatchback)

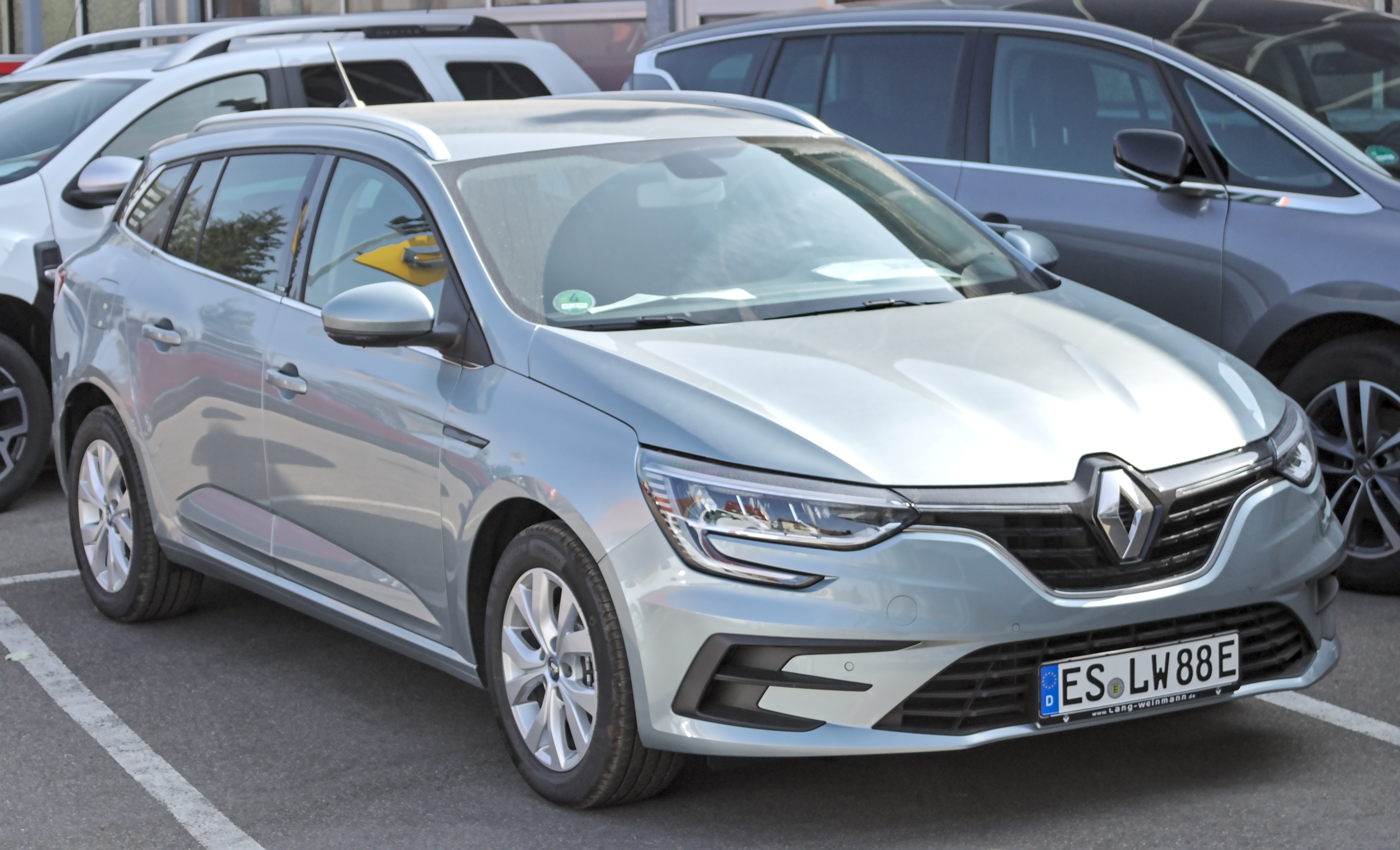
Mégane Grandtour (facelift)

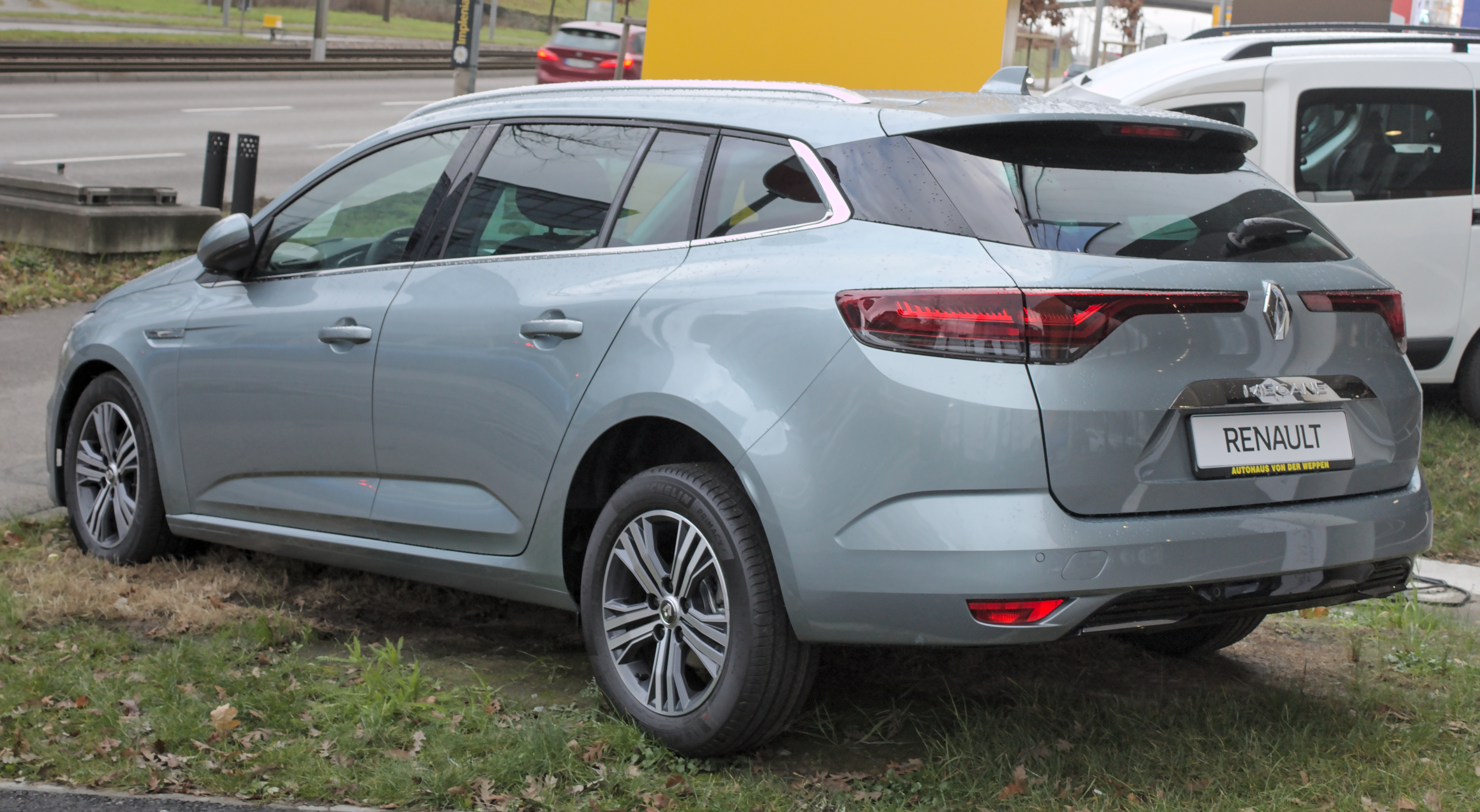
Mégane Grandtour (facelift)

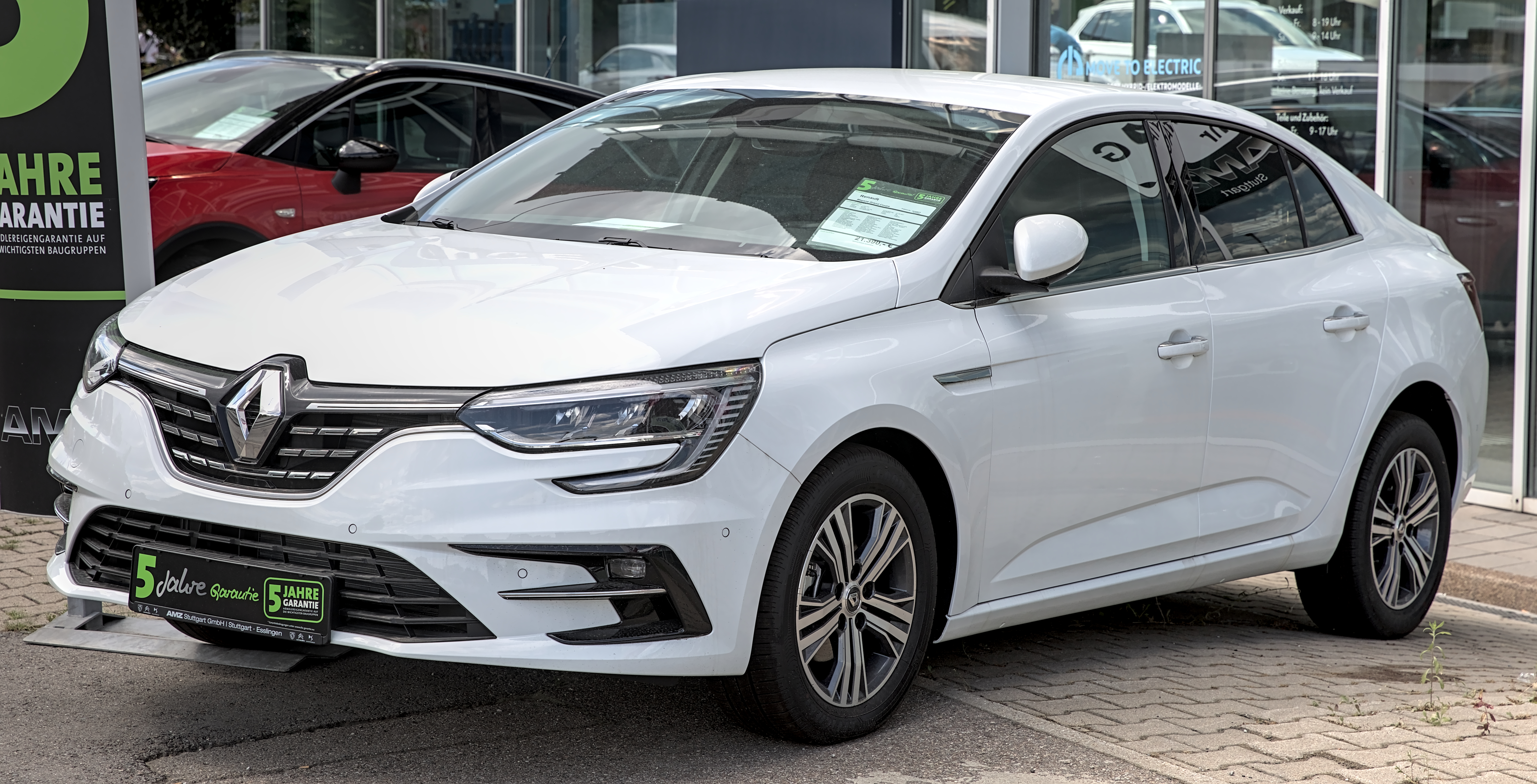
Mégane saloon (facelift)

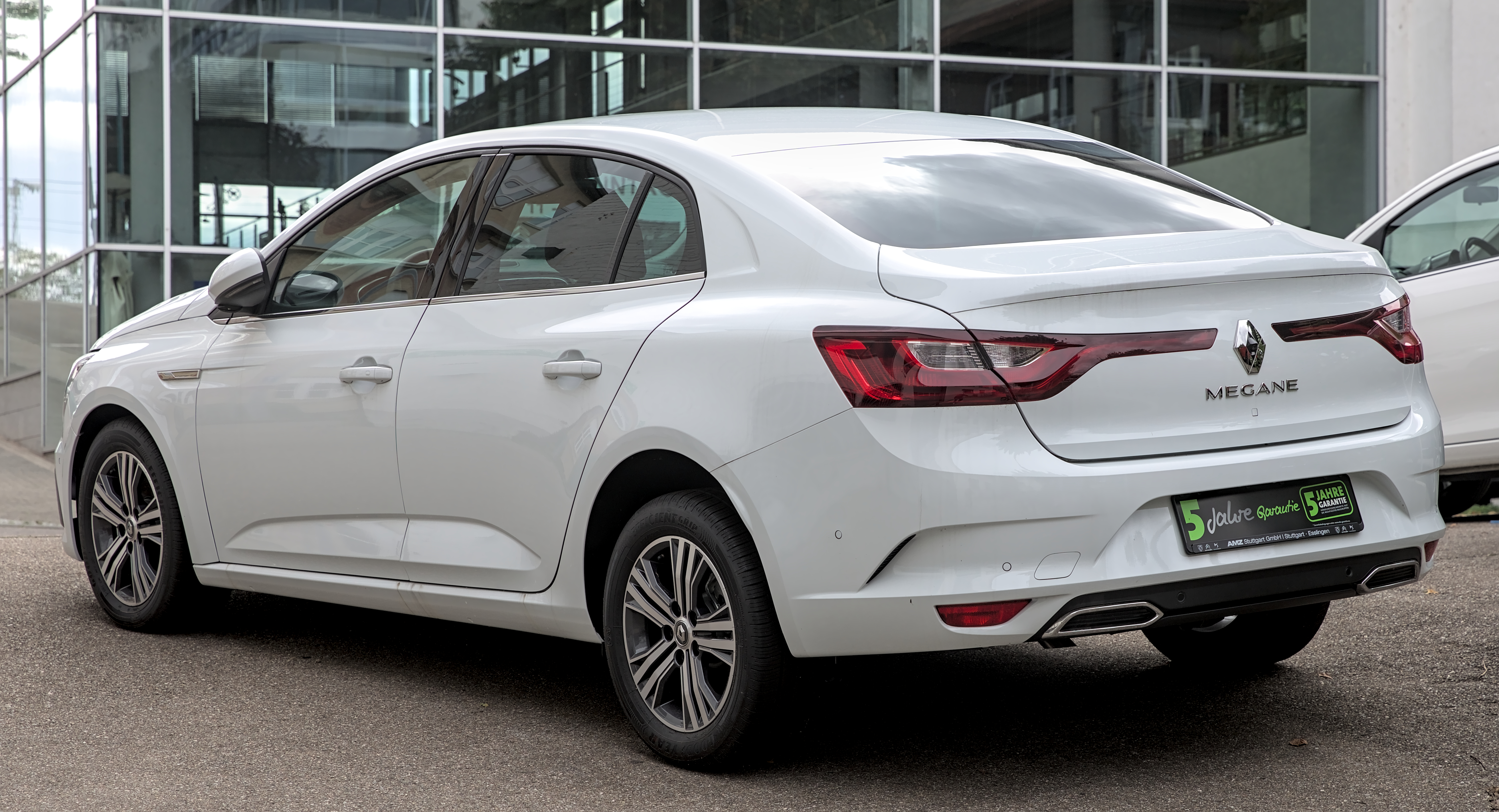
Mégane saloon (facelift)

== Fifth generation (Megane E-Tech, 2022) ==
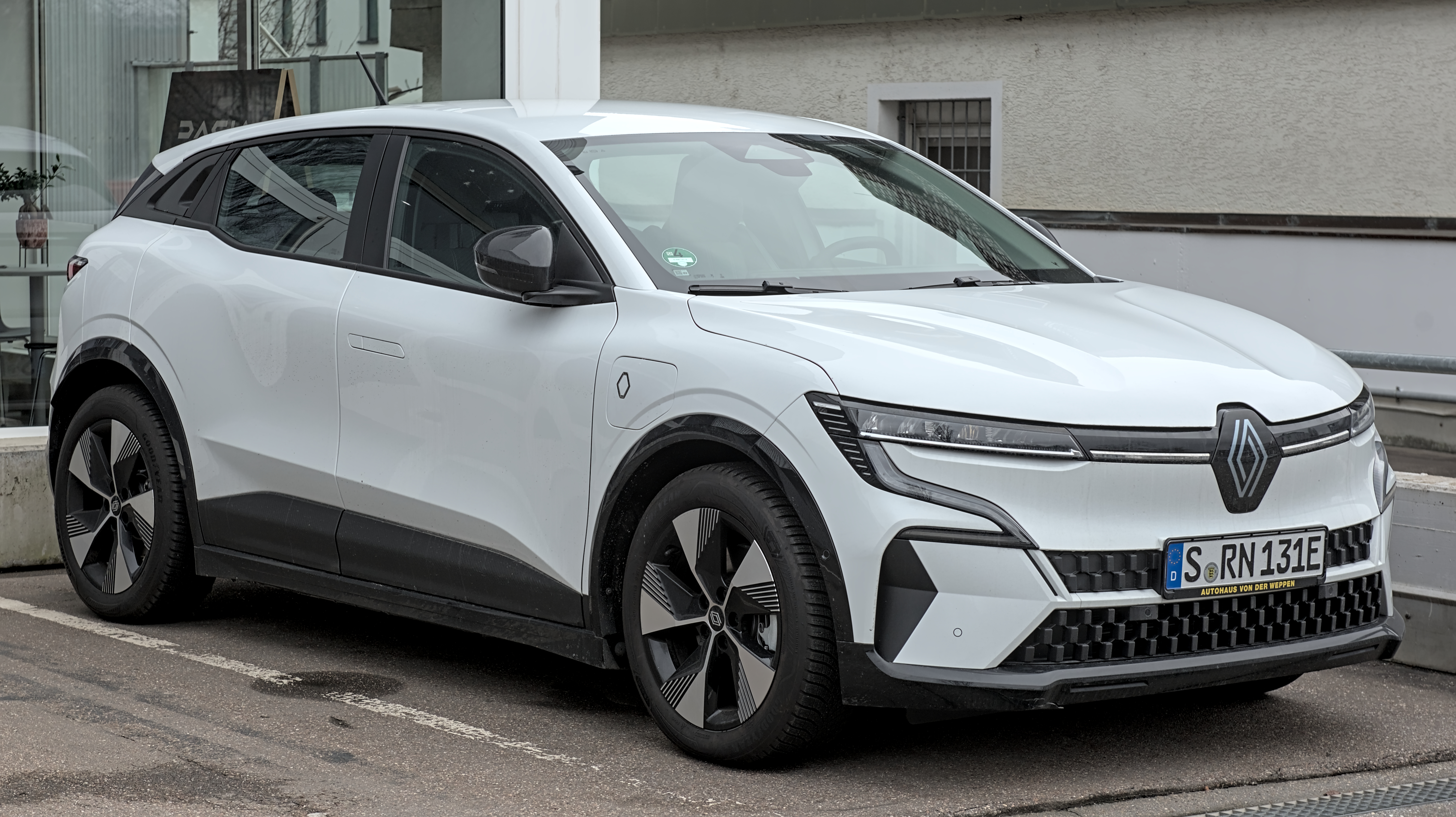
Renault Megane E-Tech

The Megane E-Tech is a battery electric car using the Megane nameplate that was launched in February 2022. It is built on a dedicated electric vehicle platform called the CMF-EV.

== Nameplate usage ==
=== Mégane Scénic ===
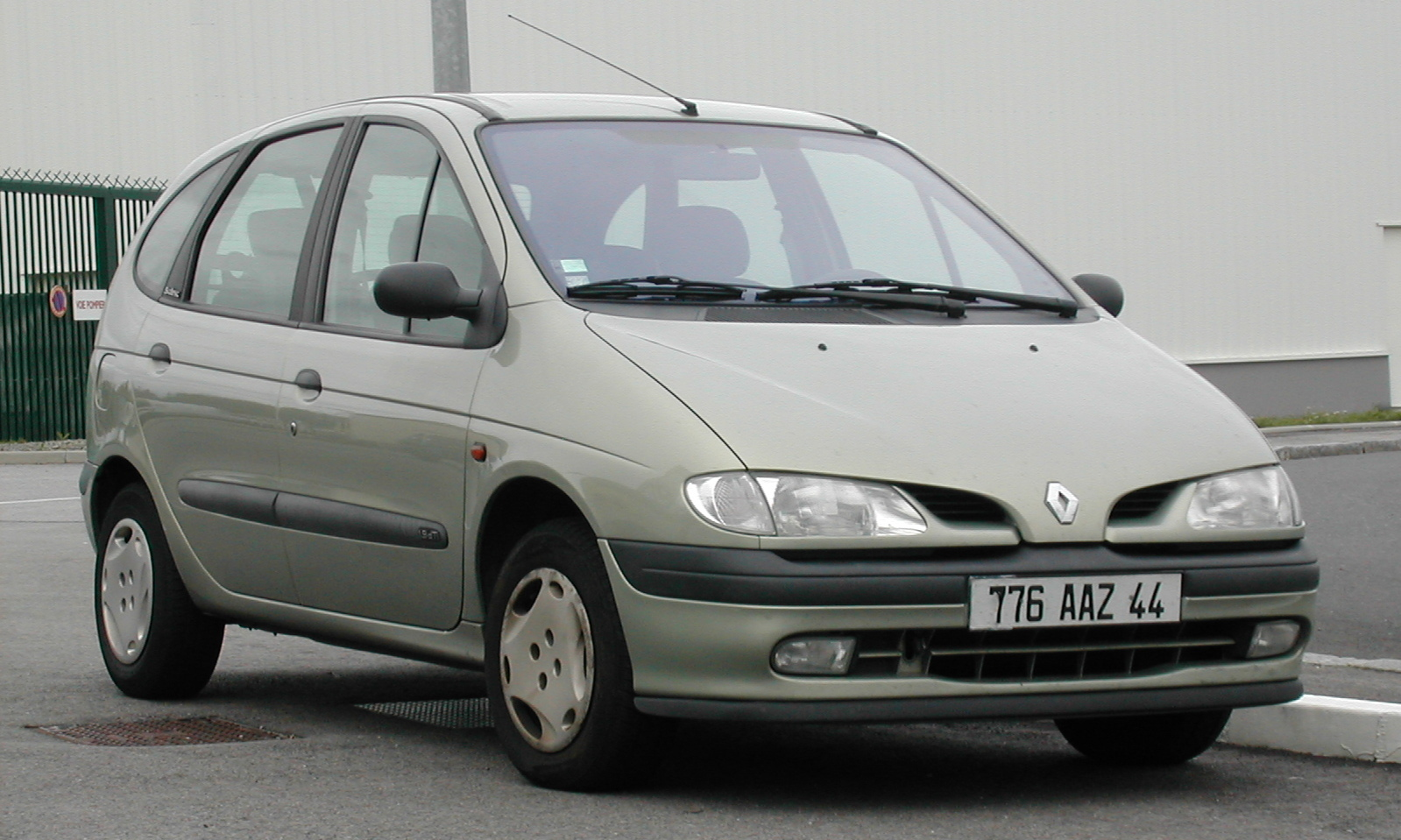
Renault Mégane Scénic

In 1996, a compact MPV called the Mégane Scénic was introduced. It was renamed to Scénic during a facelift in 1999.

=== Mégane Conquest ===
In September 2020, the rebadged version of the South Korean-made Renault Samsung XM3/Arkana was launched in former Yugoslavian countries as the Mégane Conquest due to negative connotations with the Serbian historical war criminal Arkan.

== Production ==
=== Fourth generation ===
Calendar year	Hatch	Estate	Saloon
2015	8,016	14	
2016	124,254	39,510	
2017	98,780	68,552	
2018	85,161	57,243	
2019	77,647	50,810	
2020	47,873	35,643	
2021	30,477	21,563	
2022	26,253	20,728	
2023	8,924	9,269	
2024			

== See also ==
- Mégane Renault Sport
- Renault Fluence
- Renault Scénic
