= 2025 Scottish Rally Championship =

The Motorsport UK Scottish Rally Championship is a rallying series run throughout Scotland over the course of a year that comprises both gravel and tarmac surface rallies. The 2025 series will commence on the forest tracks around Inverness on 1 March with the season finale due to take place in the Forests, around Castle Douglas on 13 September.

The title sponsor for 2025 is Asset Alliance Group for the second year as part of a three year deal.

Following the Galloway Hills Rally in September driver David Bogie was declared champion having won 4 out of the 5 events thus far. His win meant he was crowned Scottish Rally Champion for a record breaking seventh time.

== 2025 calendar ==
For season 2025 there will be seven events held on both gravel and tarmac surfaces.

In mid-December 2024 the organisers announced the cancellation of the series opener, the Snowman Rally which was originally scheduled for 1 March 2025. The reason given was the failure to secure enough suitable forest stage mileage from Forestry and Land Scotland. As a result the series reserve event, the Grizedale Stages Rally was added to the calendar.

Jim Clark Reivers Rally On 24 May during the third round of the British Rally Championship, the Jim Clark Rally based in Duns, a tragic accident involving a competing car resulted in the death of the co-driver. As a result the event and the following days Reivers Rally were cancelled by organisers.

| Round | Dates | Event | Rally HQ | Surface | Website |
|---|---|---|---|---|---|
| - | Cancelled | Snowman Rally | Inverness | Gravel | (website) |
| 1 | 26 April | Speyside Stages Rally | Elgin | Gravel | (website) |
| - | Cancelled | Jim Clark Reivers Rally | Duns | Tarmac | (website) |
| 2 | 20–21 June | Argyll Rally | Dunoon | Tarmac | (website) |
| 3 | 19 July | RSAC Scottish Rally | Dalbeattie | Gravel | (website) |
| 4 | 8–9 August | Grampian Forest Rally | Banchory | Gravel | (website) |
| 5 | 13 September | Galloway Hills Rally | Castle Douglas | Gravel | (website) |
| 6 | 6 December | Grizedale Stages Rally | Coniston | Gravel | (website) |

== 2025 events podium ==
| Round | Rally name | Podium finishers | | | |
| Round | Rally name | Placing | Driver / Co-Driver | Car | Time / Diff leader |
|---|---|---|---|---|---|
| 1 | Speyside Stages (26 April) | 1 | David Bogie / John Rowan | Škoda Fabia RS Rally2 | 37:00 |
| 1 | Speyside Stages (26 April) | 2 | Scott Macbeth / Dan Forsyth | Škoda Fabia R5 | + 0:47 |
| 1 | Speyside Stages (26 April) | 3 | Euan Thorburn / Paul Beaton | Volkswagen Polo R5 | + 0:53 |
| - | Jim Clark Reivers Rally (25 May) Cancelled | 1 | | | |
| - | Jim Clark Reivers Rally (25 May) Cancelled | 2 | | | |
| - | Jim Clark Reivers Rally (25 May) Cancelled | 3 | | | |
| 2 | Argyll Rally (20-21 June) | 1 | Rory Young / Jamie Edwards | Skoda Fabia RS Rally2 | 57:56 |
| 2 | Argyll Rally (20-21 June) | 2 | Hugh Brunton / Richard Wardle | Volkswagen Polo R5 | + 0:28 |
| 2 | Argyll Rally (20-21 June) | 3 | Mark McCulloch / Michael Hendry | Proton Satria Evo | + 0:48 |
| 3 | RSAC Scottish Rally (19 July) | 1 | David Bogie / Kirsty Riddick | Škoda Fabia RS Rally2 | 40:52 |
| 3 | RSAC Scottish Rally (19 July) | 2 | Mark McCulloch / Michael Hendry | Proton Satria Evo | + 0:13 |
| 3 | RSAC Scottish Rally (19 July) | 3 | Scott Beattie/ Peredur Davies | Ford Fiesta R5 | + 0:48 |
| 4 | Grampian Forest Rally (8-9 August) | 1 | David Bogie / Kirsty Riddick | Škoda Fabia RS Rally2 | 53:40.4 |
| 4 | Grampian Forest Rally (8-9 August) | 2 | Scott Beattie/ Peredur Davies | Ford Fiesta R5 | + 42.9 |
| 4 | Grampian Forest Rally (8-9 August) | 3 | Mark McCulloch / Michael Hendry | Proton Satria Evo | + 1:01.3 |
| 5 | Galloway Hills Rally (13 September) | 1 | David Bogie / Kirsty Riddick | Škoda Fabia RS Rally2 | 37:54 |
| 5 | Galloway Hills Rally (13 September) | 2 | Mark McCulloch / Michael Hendry | Proton Satria Evo | + 0:27 |
| 5 | Galloway Hills Rally (13 September) | 3 | Rory Young / Allan Cathers | Škoda Fabia RS Rally2 | + 1:11 |
| 6 | Grizedale Stages Rally (6 December) | 1 | David Bogie / Kirsty Riddick | Volkswagen Polo R5 | 47:18 |
| 6 | Grizedale Stages Rally (6 December) | 2 | Stephen Petch / Michael Wilkinson | Ford Fiesta Rally2 | + 1:55 |
| 6 | Grizedale Stages Rally (6 December) | 3 | Jock Armstrong / Owen Paterson | Škoda Fabia Proto | + 2:09 |

== Competitors Points Classification ==
Points are awarded to the highest placed registered competitor on each event as follows: 30, 28, 27, 26, and so on down to 1 point. Every finisher will receive at least 1 point. At the end of the Championship, competitors will count their best 4 scores out of the 6 events as their final overall Championship score.

Drivers Overall

| Pos | Driver | Car (s) | SSR | JCR | ARG | SCO | GFR | GHR | GRZ | Points |
|---|---|---|---|---|---|---|---|---|---|---|
| 1 | David Bogie | Škoda Fabia RS Rally2 | 30 | - | DNS | 30 | 30 | 30 | 30 | 120 |
| 2 | Mark McCulloch | Proton Satria Evo S2000 | 24 | - | 27 | 28 | 27 | 28 | DNS | 110 |
| 3 | Scott Beattie | Volkswagen Polo GTI R5 | 26 | - | DNS | 27 | 28 | DNS | 25 | 106 |
| 4 | Stephen Petch | Ford Fiesta Rally2 | 23 | - | DNS | DNS | 25 | 25 | 28 | 101 |
| 5 | Ian Forgan | Ford Fiesta Rally2 | 19 | - | 26 | 23 | 24 | 24 | DNS | 97 |
| Pos | Driver | Car (s) | SSR | JCR | ARG | SCO | GFR | GHR | GRZ | Pts |

| Colour | Result |
|---|---|
| Gold | Winner |
| Silver | 2nd place |
| Bronze | 3rd place |
| Green | Non-podium finish |
| Purple | Did not finish (DNF) |
| Black | Disqualified (DSQ) |
| Blank | Did not start (DNS) |
| Blue | Nominated dropped points |
