= 2012 Scottish Rally Championship =

Rallying series held in Scotland featuring gravel and tarmac events

Seasons
- ← 2011 2013 →

The Scottish Rally Championship is a rallying series run throughout Scotland over the course of a year, that comprises seven gravel rallies and one tarmac event. Points are awarded to the top placed drivers and the driver scoring the highest number of points over the season is declared Champion

David Bogie began the year as defending champion after winning four out of the eight events in 2011.

The 2012 season began in the snow-covered forest tracks around Inverness on 18 February, with the season finale taking place around Perth on 6 October. 2012 was the final year of a two-year partnership with leading motorsport tyre manufacture, DMACK Tyres.

Following the Merrick Stages Rally in September, David Bogie and Kevin Rae were declared champions.

The award ceremony took place on 1 December 2012 at Hilton Treetops Hotel, Aberdeen.

== 2012 Calendar ==
In season 2012 there were 8 events held on a variety of surfaces.

Round	Dates	Event	Rally HQ	Surface	Website
1	18 Feb	Arnold Clark Thistle Snowman Rally	Inverness	Gravel / Snow	(website)
2	17 Mar	Brick & Steel Border Counties Rally	Jedburgh	Gravel	(website)
3	14 Apr	Coltel Granite City Rally	Aberdeen	Gravel	(website)
4	3 Jun	Jim Clark Reivers Rally	Kelso	Asphalt	(website)
5	30 Jun	RSAC Scottish Rally	Dumfries	Gravel	(website)
6	4 Aug	Gleaner Oil & Gas Speyside Stages	Elgin	Gravel	(website)
7	1 Sept	Ian Broll Merrick Stages	Wigtown	Gravel	(website)
8	6 Oct	Colin McRae Forest Stages	Aberfeldy	Gravel	(website)

== 2012 Results ==
Round	Rally name	Podium finishers			
Round	Rally name	Placing	Driver / Co-Driver	Car	Time
1	Arnold Clark Thistle Snowman Rally (18 February)	1	David Bogie / Kevin Rae	Mitsubishi Lancer Evo 9	50:03
1	Arnold Clark Thistle Snowman Rally (18 February)	2	Mike Faulkner / Peter Foy	Mitsubishi Lancer Evo 6	+1:08
1	Arnold Clark Thistle Snowman Rally (18 February)	3	Peter Taylor / Andrew Roughead	Ford Focus WRC	+2:43
2	Brick & Steel Border Counties Rally (17 March)	1	David Bogie / Kevin Rae	Mitsubishi Lancer Evo 9	42:17
2	Brick & Steel Border Counties Rally (17 March)	2	Mike Faulkner / Peter Foy	Mitsubishi Lancer Evo 6	+1:50
2	Brick & Steel Border Counties Rally (17 March)	3	Jonathan Greer / Dai Roberts	Mitsubishi Lancer Evo 9	+1:59
3	Coltel Granite City Rally (14 April)	1	David Bogie / Kevin Rae	Mitsubishi Lancer Evo 9	33:58
3	Coltel Granite City Rally (14 April)	2	Euan Thorburn / Paul Beaton	Ford Focus WRC	+0:33
3	Coltel Granite City Rally (14 April)	3	Paul Benn / Daniel O'Brien	Ford Focus WRC	+1:51
4	Jim Clark Reivers Rally (3 June)	1	Euan Thorburn / Paul Beaton	Ford Focus WRC	43:27
4	Jim Clark Reivers Rally (3 June)	2	Mike Faulkner / Peter Foy	Mitsubishi Lancer Evo 6	+1:19
4	Jim Clark Reivers Rally (3 June)	3	Barry Groundwater / Mike Dickson	Mitsubishi Lancer Evo 9	+1:21
5	RSAC Scottish Rally (30 June)	1	David Bogie / Kevin Rae	Mitsubishi Lancer Evo 9	42:07
5	RSAC Scottish Rally (30 June)	2	Euan Thorburn / Paul Beaton	Ford Focus WRC	+0:50
5	RSAC Scottish Rally (30 June)	3	Jock Armstrong / Kirsty Riddick	Subaru Impreza	+0:57
6	Gleaner Oil & Gas Speyside Stages (4 August)	1	Euan Thorburn / Paul Beaton	Ford Focus WRC	43:01
6	Gleaner Oil & Gas Speyside Stages (4 August)	2	David Bogie / Kevin Rae	Mitsubishi Lancer Evo 9	+0:26
6	Gleaner Oil & Gas Speyside Stages (4 August)	3	Jock Armstrong / Kirsty Riddick	Subaru Impreza	+0:27
7	Ian Broll Merrick Stages (1 September)	1	David Bogie / Kevin Rae	Mitsubishi Lancer Evo 9	39:39
7	Ian Broll Merrick Stages (1 September)	2	Jock Armstrong / Kirsty Riddick	Subaru Impreza	+0:11
7	Ian Broll Merrick Stages (1 September)	3	Mike Faulkner / Peter Foy	Mitsubishi Lancer Evo 6	+0:49
8	Colin McRae Forest Stages (6 October)	1	Quintin Milne / Martin Forrest	Mitsubishi Lancer Evo 9	45:47
8	Colin McRae Forest Stages (6 October)	2	Barry Groundwater / Neil Shanks	Mitsubishi Lancer Evo 6	+33:9
8	Colin McRae Forest Stages (6 October)	3	David Bogie / Kevin Rae	Ford Escort RS	+58:8

== Drivers Points Classification (Top 5) ==
Pos	Driver	Car	TSR	BCR	GCR	JCR	SCO	GSS	MFS	CMFS	Pts
1	David Bogie	Mitsubishi Evo 9	1	1	1	Ret*	1	2	1	**	178
2	Mike Faulkner	Mitsubishi Evo 6	2	2	30*	2	4	4	3	Ret*	163
3	John McClory	Subaru Impreza	5	8	7	39*	10*	8	6	3	145
4	Barry Groundwater	Mitsubishi Evo 9	6	4	22	3	5	Ret*	Ret*	2	143
5	Euan Thorburn	Ford Focus WRC	34	5	2	1	2	1	Ret*	Ret*	142
Pos	Driver	Car	TSR	BCR	GCR	JCR	SCO	GSS	MFS	CMFS	Pts

Colour	Result
Gold	Winner
Silver	2nd place
Bronze	3rd place
Green	Non-podium finish
Purple	Did not finish (DNF)
Black	Disqualified (DSQ)
Blank	Did not start (DNS)
Blue	Nominated dropped points
*	Joker played

^{** David Bogie finished third overall on the Colin McRae Forest Stages but, having already won the SRC title, was not registered for SRC points. This was to avoid affecting championship runner-up positions.}

Points are awarded to the highest placed registered driver on each event as follows: 30, 28, 27, 26, and so on down to 1 point. At the end of the Championship, competitors will nominate their best 6 scores out of the 8 events as his/her final overall Championship score.
