= 2014 Scottish Rally Championship =

Seasons
- ← 2013 2015 →

The Scottish Rally Championship was a rallying series run throughout Scotland over the course of a year, that comprised seven gravel rallies and one tarmac event. Points were awarded to the top placed drivers and the driver scoring the highest number of points over the season was declared Champion of the series. For the second season in a row the championship was sponsored by ARR Craib Transport Ltd, an Aberdeen based road haulage and logistics company. This was a one-year deal announced in December 2013.

The 2014 season began in the snow-covered forest tracks around Inverness on 22 February, with the season finale taking place around Castle Douglas on 26 October. David Bogie began the year as defending champion after winning four out of the eight events in 2013.

Following the Colin McRae Forest Stages Rally in October, Euan Thorburn and Paul Beaton were declared 2014 Scottish rally champions. In doing so, Thorburn ended the record streak of five consecutive titles for Bogie. Thorburn won the title by five points ahead of Bogie, having won four rallies and finished as runner-up in two others, to Bogie. He was also third in the Border Counties Rally but scored second place points – as Steve Petch was not registered to score SRC points – for the event. Jock Armstrong finished the season in third place, five points in arrears of Bogie, having won the final event of the season, the Galloway Hills Rally.

== Jim Clark Reivers Rally ==
The fourth round of the season, the Jim Clark Reivers Rally was cancelled due to an accident during the preceding day's competition, the Jim Clark Rally, a round of the British Rally Championship. The incident involved a competing car, which left the road, resulting in the death of three spectators.

On 15 July 2014, the series organisers announced that the Galloway Hills Rally – a reserve event when the championship calendar was first announced – would be included as the championship finale.

== 2014 calendar ==
For season 2014 there were eight events held on a variety of surfaces.

| Round | Dates | Event | Rally HQ | Surface | Website |
|---|---|---|---|---|---|
| 1 | 22 Feb | Arnold Clark Thistle Snowman Rally | Inverness | Gravel / Snow | (website) |
| 2 | 22 Mar | Brick & Steel Border Counties Rally | Jedburgh | Gravel | (website) |
| 3 | 26 Apr | Granite City Rally | Aberdeen | Gravel | (website) |
| – | 1 Jun | Jim Clark Reivers Rally | Kelso | Asphalt | (website) |
| 4 | 28 Jun | RSAC Scottish Rally | Dumfries | Gravel | (website) |
| 5 | 2 Aug | Speyside Stages | Elgin | Gravel | (website) |
| 6 | 6 Sept | Merrick Stages | Wigtown | Gravel | (website) |
| 7 | 4 Oct | Colin McRae Forest Stages | Aberfeldy | Gravel | (website) |
| 8 | 26 Oct | Galloway Hills Rally | Castle Douglas | Gravel | (website) |

== 2014 events podium ==
| Round | Rally name | Podium finishers | | | |
| Round | Rally name | Placing | Driver / Co-Driver | Car | Time / Diff leader |
|---|---|---|---|---|---|
| 1 | Arnold Clark Thistle Snowman Rally (22 Feb) | 1 | Euan Thorburn / Paul Beaton | Ford Focus WRC | 44:29 |
| 1 | Arnold Clark Thistle Snowman Rally (22 Feb) | 2 | Quintin Milne / Martin Forrest | Mitsubishi Lancer Evolution | +0:34 |
| 1 | Arnold Clark Thistle Snowman Rally (22 Feb) | 3 | Mike Faulkner / Peter Foy | Mitsubishi Lancer EVO 9 | +0:37 |
| 2 | Brick & Steel Border Counties Rally (22 Mar) | 1 | David Bogie / Kevin Rae | Ford Focus WRC | 43:23 |
| 2 | Brick & Steel Border Counties Rally (22 Mar) | 2 | Stephen Petch / Michael Wilkinson (Note: Crew was not registered to score points towards the Scottish Rally Championship.) | Mitsubishi Lancer Evolution IX | +0:47 |
| 2 | Brick & Steel Border Counties Rally (22 Mar) | 3 | Euan Thorburn / Paul Beaton | Ford Focus WRC | +0:51 |
| 3 | Granite City Rally (26 Apr) | 1 | Euan Thorburn / Paul Beaton | Ford Focus WRC | 44:02 |
| 3 | Granite City Rally (26 Apr) | 2 | Jock Armstrong / Paula Swinscoe | Subaru Impreza | +0:37 |
| 3 | Granite City Rally (26 Apr) | 3 | Mike Faulkner / Peter Foy | Mitsubishi Lancer EVO 9 | +1:42 |
| – | Jim Clark Reivers Rally (1 Jun) | 1 | Rally cancelled | | |
| – | Jim Clark Reivers Rally (1 Jun) | 2 | Rally cancelled | | |
| – | Jim Clark Reivers Rally (1 Jun) | 3 | Rally cancelled | | |
| 4 | RSAC Scottish Rally (28 Jun) | 1 | David Bogie / Kevin Rae | Ford Fiesta R5 | 41:33.8 |
| 4 | RSAC Scottish Rally (28 Jun) | 2 | Euan Thorburn / Paul Beaton | Ford Focus WRC | +0:03.5 |
| 4 | RSAC Scottish Rally (28 Jun) | 3 | Jock Armstrong / Paula Swinscoe | Subaru Impreza | +2:12.6 |
| 5 | Speyside Stages (2 Aug) | 1 | David Bogie / Kevin Rae | Ford Fiesta R5 | 41:21 |
| 5 | Speyside Stages (2 Aug) | 2 | Euan Thorburn / Paul Beaton | Ford Focus WRC | +0:13 |
| 5 | Speyside Stages (2 Aug) | 3 | Jock Armstrong / Paula Swinscoe | Subaru Impreza | +1:45 |
| 6 | Merrick Stages (Sept 6) | 1 | Euan Thorburn / Paul Beaton | Ford Focus WRC | 40:38 |
| 6 | Merrick Stages (Sept 6) | 2 | Mike Faulkner / Peter Foy | Mitsubishi Lancer EVO 9 | +0:35 |
| 6 | Merrick Stages (Sept 6) | 3 | David Bogie / Kevin Rae | Ford Fiesta R5 | +0:37 |
| 7 | Colin McRae Forest Stages (4 Oct) | 1 | Euan Thorburn / Paul Beaton | Ford Focus WRC | 43:51 |
| 7 | Colin McRae Forest Stages (4 Oct) | 2 | Mike Faulkner / Peter Foy | Mitsubishi Lancer EVO 9 | +2:01 |
| 7 | Colin McRae Forest Stages (4 Oct) | 3 | Jock Armstrong / Paula Swinscoe | Subaru Impreza | +2:36 |
| 8 | Galloway Hills Rally (26 Oct) | 1 | Jock Armstrong / Paula Swinscoe | Subaru Impreza | 46:43 |
| 8 | Galloway Hills Rally (26 Oct) | 2 | David Bogie / Kevin Rae | Ford Fiesta R5 | +0:38 |
| 8 | Galloway Hills Rally (26 Oct) | 3 | Desi Henry / Damien Duffy | Mitsubishi Lancer EVO 9 | +1:37 |

== Drivers' championship standings (Top 10) ==
| Pos | Driver | Car | TSR | BCR | GCR | JCR | SCO | GSS | MFS | CMFS | GHR | Points |
|---|---|---|---|---|---|---|---|---|---|---|---|---|
| 1 | Euan Thorburn | Ford Focus WRC | 1 | 2 | 1 | – | 2 | 2* | 1 | 1 | DNS | 176 |
| 2 | David Bogie | Ford Focus WRC/Ford Fiesta R5+ | 4 | 1 | Ret | – | 1 | 1 | 3 | Ret | 2 | 171 |
| 3 | Jock Armstrong | Subaru Impreza | Ret | 3 | 2 | – | 3 | 3 | 4* | 3 | 1 | 166 |
| 4 | Mike Faulkner | Mitsubishi EVO IX | 3 | Ret | 3 | – | 4 | 4 | 2 | 2 | 5* | 162 |
| 5 | Barry Groundwater | Mitsubishi EVO IX | 5 | 6 | 7 | – | 5 | 6 | DNS | 4 | DNS | 147 |
| 6 | Dougal Brown | Mitsubishi EVO IX | 6 | 10* | 15* | – | 7 | 8 | 5 | 5 | 3 | 146 |
| 7 | Dale Robertson | Mitsubishi EVO IX | 16* | 14 | 12 | – | DNS | 11 | 6 | 7 | 5 | 125 |
| 8 | Mark McCulloch | Subaru Impreza | 9 | 9 | 6 | – | Ret | 10 | Ret | 14 | 8 | 124 |
| 9 | Fraser Wilson | Mitsubishi EVO IX | 11 | 11 | 10 | – | 28* | 17 | 5 | Ret | 4 | 118 |
| 10 | Bruce McCombie | Mitsubishi EVO | 7 | 8 | 8 | – | Ret | 5 | Ret | 9 | DNS | 113 |
| Pos | Driver | Car | TSR | BCR | GCR | JCR | SCO | GSS | MFS | CMFS | GHR | Points |

| Colour | Result |
|---|---|
| Gold | Winner |
| Silver | 2nd place |
| Bronze | 3rd place |
| Green | Non-podium finish |
| Purple | Did not finish (DNF) |
| Black | Disqualified (DSQ) |
| Blank | Did not start (DNS) |
| Blue | Nominated dropped points |
| * | Joker played |

Points were awarded to the highest placed registered drivers on each event as follows: 30, 28, 27, 26, and so on down to 1 point. At the end of the Championship, competitors nominated their best 6 scores out of the 8 events as their final overall Championship score.
