= 2011 Scottish Rally Championship =

Seasons
- ← 2010 2012 →

The Scottish Rally Championship is a rallying series run throughout Scotland over the course of a year, that comprises seven gravel rallies and one tarmac event. Points are awarded to the top placed drivers, and the driver scoring the highest number of points over the season is declared Champion.

The 2011 season begins in the snow-covered forest tracks around Inverness on 19 February, with the season finale taking place around Aberfeldy on 1 October. 2011 sees the commencement of a two-year partnership with leading motorsport tyre manufacture, DMACK Tyres.

David Bogie began the year as defending champion after winning six out of the eight events in 2010.

Following the Speyside stages in August, David Bogie was declared champion for the third successive year despite there being two events remaining. His 4 wins out of 6 events meant that, due to the SRC rule counting driver's best 6 best results out of 8, he could no longer be baught in the title race.

== 2011 Calendar ==
In season 2011, as in 2010, there will be 8 events held on a variety of surfaces.

Round	Dates	Event	Rally HQ	Surface	Website
1	19 Feb	Arnold Clark Thistle Snowman Rally	Inverness	Gravel / Snow	(website)
2	19 Mar	Brick & Steel Border Counties Rally	Jedburgh	Gravel	(website)
3	16 Apr	CARS Recovery Granite City Rally	Aberdeen	Gravel	(website)
4	29 May	Jim Clark Reivers Rally	Kelso	Asphalt	(website)
5	25 Jun	RSAC Scottish Rally	Dumfries	Gravel	(website)
6	6 Aug	Gleaner Oil & Gas Speyside Stages	Elgin	Gravel	(website)
7	3 Sept	ProTune Remapping Merrick Stages	Newton Stewart	Gravel	(website)
8	1 Oct	Colin McRae Forest Stages	Aberfeldy	Gravel	(website)

== 2011 Results ==
Round	Rally name	Podium finishers		
Round	Rally name	Placing	Driver / Co-Driver	Car
1	Arnold Clark Thistle Snowman Rally (19 February)	1	David Bogie / Kevin Rae	Mitsubishi Evo 9
1	Arnold Clark Thistle Snowman Rally (19 February)	2	Euan Thorburn / Paul Beaton	Mitsubishi Evo 9
1	Arnold Clark Thistle Snowman Rally (19 February)	3	Jock Armstrong / Kirsty Riddick	Subaru Impreza
2	Brick & Steel Border Counties Rally (19 March)	1	David Bogie / Kevin Rae	Mitsubishi Evo 9
2	Brick & Steel Border Counties Rally (19 March)	2	Mike Faulkner / Peter Foy	Mitsubishi Evo 6
2	Brick & Steel Border Counties Rally (19 March)	3	Euan Thorburn / Paul Beaton	Mitsubishi Evo 9
3	CARS Recovery Granite City Rally (16 April)	1	Dave Weston / Aled Davies	Ford Focus WRC
3	CARS Recovery Granite City Rally (16 April)	2	David Bogie / Kevin Rae	Mitsubishi Evo 9
3	CARS Recovery Granite City Rally (16 April)	3	David Wilson / Dave Robson	Mitsubishi Evo 9
4	Jim Clark Reivers Rally (29 May)	1	David Bogie / Kevin Rae	Metro 6R4
4	Jim Clark Reivers Rally (29 May)	2	Euan Thorburn / Paul Beaton	Mitsubishi Evo 9
4	Jim Clark Reivers Rally (29 May)	3	Jock Armstrong / Barry McNulty	Subaru Impreza
5	RSAC Scottish Rally (25 June)	1	Jock Armstrong / Kirsty Riddick	Subaru Impreza
5	RSAC Scottish Rally (25 June)	2	Mike Faulkner / Peter Foy	Mitsubishi Evo 9
5	RSAC Scottish Rally (25 June)	3	David Bogie / Kevin Rae	Mitsubishi Evo 9
6	Gleaner Oil & Gas Speyside Stages (6 August)	1	David Bogie / Kevin Rae	Mitsubishi Evo 9
6	Gleaner Oil & Gas Speyside Stages (6 August)	2	Euan Thorburn / Paul Beaton	Mitsubishi Evo 9
6	Gleaner Oil & Gas Speyside Stages (6 August)	3	Mike Faulkner / Lousie Sutherland	Mitsubishi Evo 6
7	ProTune Remapping Merrick Stages (3 September)	1	Mike Faulkner / Peter Foy	Mitsubishi Evo 6
7	ProTune Remapping Merrick Stages (3 September)	2	Robbie Head / Claire Mole	Mitsubishi Evo 9
7	ProTune Remapping Merrick Stages (3 September)	3	Wayne Sisson / David MacFadyen	Mitsubishi Evo 9
8	Colin McRae Forest Stages (1 October)	1	Euan Thorburn / Paul Beaton	Mitsubishi Evo 9
8	Colin McRae Forest Stages (1 October)	2	Shaun Sinclair / Chris Hamill	Mitsubishi Evo 9
8	Colin McRae Forest Stages (1 October)	3	Mike Faulkner / Peter Foy	Mitsubishi Evo 6

== Drivers Points Classification ==
Pos	Driver	TSR	BCR	GCR	JCR	SCO	GSS	MFS	CMFS	Pts
1	David Bogie	1	1	2	1	3	1	DNS*	DNS*	175
2	Euan Thorburn	2	3	6*	2	4*	2	4	1	167
3	Mike Faulkner	4	2	4*	4*	2	3	1	3	167
4	Robbie Head	7	5	5	5	12*	4	2	Ret*	152
5	Donnie Macdonald	6	8	12	23	9	9	Ret*	Ret*	122
Pos	Driver	TSR	BCR	GCR	JCR	SCO	GSS	MFS	CMFS	Pts

Colour	Result
Gold	Winner
Silver	2nd place
Bronze	3rd place
Green	Non-podium finish
Purple	Did not finish (DNF)
Black	Disqualified (DSQ)
Blank	Did not start (DNS)
Blue	Nominated dropped points
*	Joker played

Points are awarded to the highest placed registered driver on each event as follows: 30, 28, 27, 26, and so on down to 1 point. At the end of the Championship, competitors will count their best 6 scores out of 8 events as his/her final overall Championship score.
