= 2024 Scottish Rally Championship =

The Motorsport UK Scottish Rally Championship is a rallying series run throughout Scotland over the course of a year that comprises both gravel and tarmac surface rallies. The 2024 series will commence on the forest tracks around Inverness on 2 March with the season finale due to take place in the Forests, around Castle Douglas on 14 September.

The title sponsor for 2024 is Asset Alliance Group who have committed to sponsoring the championship for three years.

Following the Grampian Forest Rally in August, Euan Thorburn was declared champion having won three out of the five events thus far. Keir Beaton was declared Co-Driver champion following the Snowman Rally in October.

== 2024 calendar ==
For season 2024 there will be seven events held on both gravel and tarmac surfaces.

On 4 January the organisers announced that the series opener, the Snowman Rally, usually held in early March, would not take place. The reason given was the expiry of the previous agreement to use forestry land. Discussions quickly took place between the organisers and Forestry and Land Scotland to resolve the issue and a rescheduled date was announced in October.

On 24 July organisers announced the cancellation of the 2024 Galloway Hills Rally. Due to take place on 14 September, the reason given for cancellation was the failure to agree a new deal with Forestry and Land Scotland for use of the forestry roads on the event.

The reserve event, the Anglo Caledonian Rally, held in November will count towards the 2024 Motorsport UK Scottish Rally Championship.

Round	Dates	Event	Rally HQ	Surface	Website
1	20 April	Speyside Stages Rally	Elgin	Gravel	(website)
2	26 May	Jim Clark Reivers Rally	Duns	Tarmac	(website)
3	21–22 June	Argyll Rally	Dunoon	Tarmac	(website)
4	20 July	RSAC Scottish Rally	Dalbeattie	Gravel	(website)
5	9–10 August	Grampian Forest Rally	Banchory	Gravel	(website)
-	Cancelled	Galloway Hills Rally	Castle Douglas	Gravel	(website)
6	19 October	Snowman Rally	Inverness	Gravel	(website)
7	24 November	Anglo Caledonian Rally	Carlisle	Gravel	(website)

== 2024 events podium ==
Round	Rally name	Podium finishers			
Round	Rally name	Placing	Driver / Co-Driver	Car	Time / Diff leader
1	Speyside Stages (20 April)	1	David Bogie / John Rowan	Volkswagen Polo R5	38:14
1	Speyside Stages (20 April)	2	Finlay Retson / Paul Beaton	Volkswagen Polo R5	+ 0:19
1	Speyside Stages (20 April)	3	Euan Thorburn / Keir Beaton	Volkswagen Polo R5	+ 0:29
2	Jim Clark Reivers Rally (26 May)	1	Euan Thorburn / Paul Beaton	Volkswagen Polo R5	50:35.3
2	Jim Clark Reivers Rally (26 May)	2	David Henderson / Chris Williams	Ford Fiesta Rally2	+ 00:04.0
2	Jim Clark Reivers Rally (26 May)	3	Mark McCulloch / Michael Hendry	Proton Satria Evo	+ 01:37.3
3	Argyll Rally (21-22 June)	1	Euan Thorburn / Keir Beaton	Volkswagen Polo R5	1:02:57
3	Argyll Rally (21-22 June)	2	Finlay Retson / Paul Beaton	Volkswagen Polo R5	+ 0:51
3	Argyll Rally (21-22 June)	3	Michael Binnie / Claire Mole	Ford Fiesta R5	+ 1:05
4	RSAC Scottish Rally (20 July)	1	David Bogie / Kirsty Riddick	Volkswagen Polo R5	43:50
4	RSAC Scottish Rally (20 July)	2	Euan Thorburn / Keir Beaton	Volkswagen Polo R5	+ 0:36
4	RSAC Scottish Rally (20 July)	3	Finlay Retson / Paul Beaton	Volkswagen Polo R5	+ 0:37
5	Grampian Forest Rally (9-10 August)	1	Euan Thorburn / Keir Beaton	Volkswagen Polo R5	54:20.3
5	Grampian Forest Rally (9-10 August)	2	Scott Beattie / Peredur Davies	Ford Fiesta R5	+00:26
5	Grampian Forest Rally (9-10 August)	3	Hugh Brunton / Terry Mallin	Škoda Fabia Rally2	+01:04
-	Galloway Hills Rally (14 September); CANCELLED	1	-		
-	Galloway Hills Rally (14 September); CANCELLED	2	-		
-	Galloway Hills Rally (14 September); CANCELLED	3	-		
6	Snowman Rally (19 October)	1	John Wink / Neil Shanks	Hyundai i20 R5	40:11
6	Snowman Rally (19 October)	2	Scott Beattie / Emily Easton-Page	Ford Fiesta R5	+0:09
6	Snowman Rally (19 October)	3	Jock Armstrong / Owen Paterson	Škoda Fabia Proto	+0:22
7	Anglo Caledonian Rally (24 November)	1	Mark McCulloch / Michael Hendry	Proton Satria Evo	45:24
7	Anglo Caledonian Rally (24 November)	2	John Wink / Jack Bowen	Hyundai i20 R5	+0:15
7	Anglo Caledonian Rally (24 November)	3	Jock Armstrong / Owen Paterson	Škoda Fabia Proto	+0:39

== Competitors Points Classification ==
Points are awarded to the highest placed registered competitor on each event as follows: 30, 28, 27, 26, and so on down to 1 point. Every finisher will receive at least 1 point. At the end of the Championship, competitors will count their best 5 scores out of the 7 events as their final overall Championship score.

Driver Overall

Pos	Driver	Car (s)	SSR	JCR	ARG	SCO	GFR	GHR	SNO	ACR	Points
1	Euan Thorburn	Volkswagen Polo R5	27	30	30	28	30	-	DNS	DNS	145
2	Mark McCulloch	Proton Satria EVO S2000	23	27	24	23	26	-	26	30	133
3	John Wink	Hyundai i20 R5	Ret	24	23	25	Ret	-	30	28	130
4	Jock Armstrong	Škoda Fabia Proto; Subaru Impreza	26	23	DNS	Ret	23	-	27	27	126
5	Stephen Petch	Ford Fiesta Rally2	26	DNS	DNS	24	24	-	25	26	124
Pos	Driver	Car (s)	SSR	JCR	ARG	SCO	GFR	GHR	SNO	ACR	Pts

Colour	Result
Gold	Winner
Silver	2nd place
Bronze	3rd place
Green	Non-podium finish
Purple	Did not finish (DNF)
Black	Disqualified (DSQ)
Blank	Did not start (DNS)
Blue	Nominated dropped points

Co-Driver Overall

Pos	Driver	SSR	JCR	ARG	SCO	GFR	GHR	SNO	ACR	Points
1	Keir Beaton	27	26	23	28	30	-	25	DNS	136
2	Michael Hendry	23	27	24	23	27	-	27	30	135
3	Owen Paterson	26	24	9	Ret	24	-	28	28	130
4	Michael Wilkinson	25	DNS	DNS	24	25	-	26	27	127
5	Paul Beaton	28	30	30	27	Ret	-	0	DNS	115
Pos	Driver	SSR	JCR	ARG	SCO	GFR	GHR	SNO	ACR	Pts
