= 2026 Scottish Rally Championship =

The Motorsport UK Scottish Rally Championship was a rallying series run throughout Scotland over the course of a year that comprises both gravel and tarmac surface rallies. The 2026 series commenced on the forest tracks around Inverness on 14 February with the season finale was held in the Grampian Forest Rally around Banchory on 8 August.

The title sponsor for 2026 was Asset Alliance Group for the third year as part of a three-year deal.

Following the Grampian Forest Rally in August, driver Garry Pearson was declared champion, having won 5 of the 6 events thus far. Chris Lees was declared Co-driver champion.

== 2026 calendar ==
For season 2026 there would be seven events held on both gravel and tarmac surfaces.

On 30 August 2026 the organisers announced the cancellation of the series closing event, the Galloway Hills Rally which was originally scheduled for 12 September 2026. The reason given was the failure to secure enough entries.

Round	Dates	Event	Rally HQ	Surface	Website
1	14 February	Snowman Rally	Inverness	Gravel	(website)
2	14 March	Border Counties Rally	Hawick	Tarmac	(website)
3	24 May	Jim Clark Reivers Rally	Duns	Tarmac	(website)
4	19–20 June	Argyll Rally	Dunoon	Tarmac	(website)
5	18 July	RSAC Scottish Rally	Dalbeattie	Gravel	(website)
6	7–8 August	Grampian Forest Rally	Banchory	Gravel	(website)
-	Cancelled	Galloway Hills Rally	Castle Douglas	Gravel	(website)

== 2026 events podium ==
Round	Rally name	Podium finishers			
Round	Rally name	Placing	Driver / Co-Driver	Car	Time / Diff leader
1	Snowman Rally (14 February)	1	Scott Macbeth / Andrew Falconer	Volkswagen Polo R5	33:26
1	Snowman Rally (14 February)	2	Daniel Sigurdarson / Astra Sigurdardottir	Škoda Fabia RS Rally2	+ 0:17
1	Snowman Rally (14 February)	3	Alexander Vassallo / Chris Lees	Ford Fiesta Rally2	+ 0:43
2	Border Counties Rally (14 March)	1	Garry Pearson / Hannah McKillop	Ford Fiesta Rally2	43:09
2	Border Counties Rally (14 March)	2	Scott Macbeth / Andrew Falconer	Volkswagen Polo R5	+ 01:14
2	Border Counties Rally (14 March)	3	Jock Armstrong / Craig Nelson	Subaru Impreza	+ 02:32
3	Jim Clark Reivers Rally (24 May)	1	Garry Pearson / Hannah McKillop	Ford Fiesta Rally2	0:46:59.7
3	Jim Clark Reivers Rally (24 May)	2	Hugh Brunton / Drew Sturrock	Toyota GR Yaris Rally2	+ 00:59.7
3	Jim Clark Reivers Rally (24 May)	3	Alexander Vassallo / Chris Lees	Ford Fiesta Rally2	+ 01:16.8
4	Argyll Rally (19–20 June)	1	Garry Pearson / Jack Morton	Škoda Fabia RS Rally2	55:23
4	Argyll Rally (19–20 June)	2	Scott Macbeth / Andrew Falconer	Volkswagen Polo R5	+ 0:14
4	Argyll Rally (19–20 June)	3	Mark McCulloch / Michael Hendry	Proton Satria Evo	+ 1:43
5	RSAC Scottish Rally (18 July)	1	Garry Pearson / Jack Morton	Ford Fiesta Rally2	39:42
5	RSAC Scottish Rally (18 July)	2	Alexander Vassallo / Chris Lees	Ford Fiesta Rally2	+ 0:18
5	RSAC Scottish Rally (18 July)	3	Mark McCulloch / Michael Hendry	Proton Satria Evo	+ 01:05
6	Grampian Forest Rally (7–8 August)	1	Garry Pearson / Hannah McKillop	Ford Fiesta Rally2	54:17.9
6	Grampian Forest Rally (7–8 August)	2	Alexander Vassallo / Chris Lees	Ford Fiesta Rally2	+ 1:51.9
6	Grampian Forest Rally (7–8 August)	3	Stephen Petch / Michael Wilkinson	Ford Fiesta Rally2	+ 3:50.4
7	Galloway Hills Rally (12 September) Cancelled	1	-		
7	Galloway Hills Rally (12 September) Cancelled	2	-		
7	Galloway Hills Rally (12 September) Cancelled	3	-		

== Drivers Points Classification ==
Points are awarded to the highest placed registered driver on each event as follows: 30, 28, 27, 26, and so on down to 1 point for every entered competitor. Every finisher will receive at least 1 point. At the end of the Championship, competitors counted their best 4 scores out of the 6 events as their final overall Championship score.

Drivers may nominate one event as their 'joker', on which if they finish in the top five they will score additional points: 5, 4, 3, 2, 1.

Position	1st	2nd	3rd	4th	5th	6th	7th	8th	9th	10th
Points	30	28	27	26	25	24	23	22	21	20
Joker Points	5	4	3	2	1					

=== Drivers Points Classification ===
Pos	Driver	Car	SNO	BCR	JCR	ARG	SCO	GFR	GHR	Points
1	Garry Pearson	Ford Fiesta Rally2	DNS	~~30~~	30	30	35 *	30	-	125
2	Alex Vassallo	Ford Fiesta Rally2	27	Ret	27	~~26~~	28	32 *	-	114
3	Mark McCulloch	Proton Satria EVO S2000	24	~~18~~	26	30 *	27	Ret	-	107
4	Stephen Petch	Ford Fiesta Rally2	~~21~~	26	24	DNS	25	27	-	102
5	Craig Rutherford	Ford Escort Mk2	~~19~~	23	22	25	Ret *	23	-	93
Pos	Driver	Car	SNO	BCR	JCR	ARG	SCO	GFR	GHR	Pts

Colour	Result
Gold	Winner
Silver	2nd place
Bronze	3rd place
Green	Non-podium finish
Purple	Did not finish (DNF)
Black	Disqualified (DSQ)
Blank	Did not start (DNS)
Blue	Nominated dropped points
*	Joker played

=== Co-Drivers Classification ===
Pos	Co-Driver	SNO	BCR	JCR	ARG	SCO	GFR	GHR	Points
1	Chris lees	27	Ret	27	~~26~~	28	32 *	-	114
2	Michael Hendry	26	~~20~~	26	30 *	27	Ret	-	109
3	Michael Wilkinson	~~23~~	26	23	DNS	25	27	-	101
4	Andrew Falconer	35 *	28	Ret	28	DNS	Ret	-	91
5	Hannah McKillop	DNS	30	30	DNS	DNS	30	-	90
Pos	Co-Driver	SNO	BCR	JCR	ARG	SCO	GFR	GHR	Pts
