= 2019 Scottish Rally Championship =

The Scottish Rally Championship is a rallying series run throughout Scotland over the course of a year, that comprises seven gravel surface events.

The 2019 series began on the snow-covered forest tracks around Inverness on 9 February, with the season finale taking place around Dalbeattie on 14 September.

Following the Grampian Stages Rally in August, Euan Thorburn and regular co-driver Paul Beaton were declared champions in their Ford Focus WRC. They had won four of the five events thus far and were uncatchable in the points table.

== 2019 calendar ==
For season 2019 there are to be seven events held predominantly on gravel surfaces.

Snowman Rally On 7 February it was announced via the organisers Facebook account that the 2019 event would be cancelled. The reason given was attributed to the extremely unsafe conditions of the course, with all stages having a thick covering of Ice.

Round	Dates	Event	Rally HQ	Surface	Website
-	Cancelled	Snowman Rally	Inverness	Gravel / Snow	(website)
1	16 Mar	Border Counties Rally	Jedburgh	Gravel	(website)
2	20 Apr	Speyside Stages Rally	Elgin	Gravel	(website)
3	18 May	RSAC Scottish Rally	Lockerbie	Gravel	(website)
4	22 Jun	Argyll Rally	Dunoon	Gravel	(website)
5	10 Aug	Grampian Stages Rally	Banchory	Gravel	(website)
6	14 Sep	Galloway Hills Rally	Dalbeattie	Gravel	(website)

== 2019 events podium ==
Round	Rally name	Podium finishers			
Round	Rally name	Placing	Driver / Co-Driver	Car	Time / Diff leader
-	Snowman Rally (Cancelled)	1			
-	Snowman Rally (Cancelled)	2			
-	Snowman Rally (Cancelled)	3			
1	Border Counties Rally (16 March)	1	Euan Thorburn / Paul Beaton	Ford Focus WRC	40:51
1	Border Counties Rally (16 March)	2	Garry Pearson / Dale Bowen	Ford Fiesta R5	+0:33
1	Border Counties Rally (16 March)	3	Stephen Petch / Michael Wilkinson (Note: Crew was not registered to score points towards the Scottish Rally Championship.)	Ford Fiesta	+1:26
2	Speyside Stages (20 April)	1	Euan Thorburn / Paul Beaton	Ford Focus WRC	39:46
2	Speyside Stages (20 April)	2	Jock Armstrong / Cameron Fair	Subaru Impreza	+0:41
2	Speyside Stages (20 April)	3	Freddie Milne / Patrick Walsh	Mitsubishi Lancer EVO VII	+1:29
3	RSAC Scottish Rally (18 May)	1	David Bogie / John Rowan	Škoda Fabia R5	40:14
3	RSAC Scottish Rally (18 May)	2	Euan Thorburn / Paul Beaton	Ford Focus WRC	+00:06
3	RSAC Scottish Rally (18 May)	3	Garry Pearson / Dale Bowen	Ford Fiesta R5	+00:20
4	Argyll Rally (22 June)	1	Euan Thorburn / Paul Beaton	Ford Focus WRC	40:36
4	Argyll Rally (22 June)	2	Garry Pearson / Dale Bowen	Ford Fiesta R5	+01:02
4	Argyll Rally (22 June)	3	Bruce McCombie / Michael Coutts	Ford Focus WRC	+01:44
5	Grampian Stages Rally (10 August)	1	Euan Thorburn / Paul Beaton	Ford Focus WRC	42:30
5	Grampian Stages Rally (10 August)	2	Jock Armstrong / Cameron Fair	Subaru Impreza	+0:27
5	Grampian Stages Rally (10 August)	3	John Wink / Neil Shanks	Hyundai i20 R5	+1:55
6	Galloway Hills Rally (14 September)	1	David Bogie / John Rowan	Mini WRC	41:15.2
6	Galloway Hills Rally (14 September)	2	Jock Armstrong / Cameron Fair	Subaru Impreza	+1:08.3
6	Galloway Hills Rally (14 September)	3	Michael Binnie / Claire Mole	Mitsubishi Lancer EVO IX	+1:52.6

== Drivers Points Classification ==
Pos	Driver	Car	SNO	BCR	SSR	SCO	ARG	GSR	GHR	Points
1	Euan Thorburn	Ford Focus WRC	-	1	1	2	1	1	~~DNS~~*	148
2	Jock Armstrong	Subaru Impreza	-	5	2	4	~~DNS~~*	2	2	135
3	Michael Binnie	Mitsubishi Evo IX	-	4	4	~~9~~*	4	4	3	131
4	Keith Morris	Mitsubishi Evo IX	-	13	10	10	~~Ret*~~	7	7	109
4=	Alan Dickson	Mitsubishi Evo IX	-	~~10~~*	9	10	7	9	7	109
Pos	Driver	Car	SNO	BCR	SSR	SCO	ARG	GSR	GHR	Pts

Colour	Result
Gold	Winner
Silver	2nd place
Bronze	3rd place
Green	Non-podium finish
Purple	Did not finish (DNF)
Black	Disqualified (DSQ)
Blank	Did not start (DNS)
Blue	Nominated dropped points

Points are awarded to the highest placed registered driver on each event as follows: 30, 28, 27, 26, and so on down to 1 point. At the end of the Championship, competitors will count their best 5 scores out of the 6 events as his/her final overall Championship score.
