= 2015 Scottish Rally Championship =

Seasons
- ← 2014 2016 →

The 2015 Scottish Rally Championship season was the 47th season of the Scottish Rally Championship, a rallying series run throughout Scotland over the course of a year. It was due to be contested over eight gravel rallies, but this was reduced to six events in 2015 after two rallies were cancelled. Points were awarded to the top placed drivers and the driver scoring the highest number of points over the season was declared Champion of the series.

The 2015 season began in the snow-covered forest tracks around Inverness on 21 February, with the season finale on 1 August, after the scheduled final event was cancelled. Jock Armstrong and regular co-driver Paula Swinscoe were declared champions following a consistent season where they scored two first and three second places. The Armstrong-Swinscoe pairing finished twelve points ahead of Bruce McCombie and Mike Faulkner. Faulkner clinched the runner-up position on countback, by two third places to one. Defending champions David Bogie and Kevin Rae won four rallies during the season – one of which being a class win behind the unregistered Dave Weston in Aberdeen – but their two retirements ultimately resulted in a fourth place championship position.

== 2015 calendar ==
For season 2015 there was to be eight events held on a variety of surfaces, but this was reduced to six following the cancellation of two events.

Round	Dates	Event	Rally HQ	Surface	Website
1	21 February	Arnold Clark Thistle Snowman Rally	Inverness	Gravel / Snow	(website)
2	21 March	Border Counties Rally	Jedburgh	Gravel	(website)
3	2 May	Granite City Rally	Aberdeen	Gravel	(website)
4	31 May	Jim Clark Reivers Rally	Kelso	Gravel	(website)
5	27 June	RSAC Scottish Rally	Dumfries	Gravel	(website)
6	1 August	Speyside Stages	Elgin	Gravel	(website)

=== Calendar changes ===
On 24 April, the Merrick Stages Rally management team announced via a press release that the 2015 event – usually round 7 of the championship and held in September – would not take place. The team intended to concentrate on a new style event for 2016. A stand-in eighth event was expected to be announced by the SRC, however, after failing to obtain the agreement of all registered competitors it was decided to remain a seven event calendar for 2015.

The Colin McRae Forest Stages intended to trial a new format for 2015 with the event taking place over two days. Competitors contesting the event were to tackle 2 or 3 special stages on the Saturday before an overnight halt and then resume the rally on Sunday morning with another 2 or 3 stages. However, due to reduced entries the organising committee announced on 23 September that the event would have to be cancelled.

Competitors nominated their best five scores from the six previous events of the season to find the champion driver.

== 2015 events podium ==
Round	Rally name	Podium finishers			
Round	Rally name	Placing	Driver / Co-Driver	Car	Time / Diff leader
1	Snowman Rally (21 February)	1	Jock Armstrong / Paula Swinscoe	Subaru Impreza	43:59
1	Snowman Rally (21 February)	2	Bruce McCombie / Michael Coutts	Mitsubishi Lancer Evolution	+0:16
1	Snowman Rally (21 February)	3	Mike Faulkner / Peter Foy	Mitsubishi Lancer Evolution 9	+0:29
2	Border Counties Rally (21 March)	1	David Bogie / Kevin Rae	Ford Fiesta R5+	32:45
2	Border Counties Rally (21 March)	2	Stephen Petch / Jack Morton (Note: Crew was not registered to score points towards the Scottish Rally Championship.)	Ford Fiesta R5+	+0:40
2	Border Counties Rally (21 March)	3	Peter Taylor / Andrew Roughead	Ford Focus	+0:44
3	Granite City Rally (2 May)	1	Dave Weston / Paul Beaton	Subaru Impreza WRC	40:27 (Note: Per the championship's sporting regulations, Weston was awarded victory over Bogie after recording a faster time on the final stage.)
3	Granite City Rally (2 May)	2	David Bogie / Kevin Rae	Ford Fiesta R5+	+0:00
3	Granite City Rally (2 May)	3	Jock Armstrong / Paula Swinscoe	Subaru Impreza	+1:45
4	Jim Clark Reivers Rally (31 May)	1	Jock Armstrong / Paula Swinscoe	Subaru Impreza	41:27
4	Jim Clark Reivers Rally (31 May)	2	Mike Faulkner / Peter Foy	Mitsubishi Lancer Evolution 9	+0:39
4	Jim Clark Reivers Rally (31 May)	3	Peter Taylor / Andrew Roughead	Ford Focus WRC	+0:45
5	RSAC Scottish Rally (27 June)	1	David Bogie / Kevin Rae	Ford Fiesta R5+	39:29
5	RSAC Scottish Rally (27 June)	2	Jock Armstrong / Paula Swinscoe	Subaru Impreza	+1:05
5	RSAC Scottish Rally (27 June)	3	Rory Young / Allan Cathers	Ford Fiesta R5	+1:26
6	Speyside Stages (1 August)	1	David Bogie / Kevin Rae	Ford Fiesta R5+	41:46
6	Speyside Stages (1 August)	2	Jock Armstrong / Paula Swinscoe	Subaru Impreza	+0:50
6	Speyside Stages (1 August)	3	Donnie Macdonald / Andrew Falconer	Mitsubishi Lancer Evolution 9	+1:31

== Drivers' championship standings ==
Pos	Driver	Car	TSR	BCR	GCR	JCR	SCO	SSR	Points
1	Jock Armstrong	Subaru Impreza	1	Ret	2	1	2	2	144
2	Mike Faulkner	Mitsubishi Lancer Evo IX	3	Ret	3	2	5	5	132
3	Bruce McCombie	Mitsubishi Lancer Evo IX	2	4	5	3	7	4	132
4	David Bogie	Ford Fiesta R5+	Ret	1	1	Ret	1	1	120
5	Shaun Sinclair	Mitsubishi Lancer Evo IX	7	5	4	DNS	8	7	117
Pos	Driver	Car	TSR	BCR	GCR	JCR	SCO	SSR	Points

Colour	Result
Gold	Winner
Silver	2nd place
Bronze	3rd place
Green	Non-podium finish
Purple	Did not finish (DNF)
Black	Disqualified (DSQ)
Blank	Did not start (DNS)
Blue	Nominated dropped points
*	Joker played

Points were awarded to the highest placed registered drivers on each event as follows: 30, 28, 27, 26, and so on down to 1 point. At the end of the Championship, competitors nominated their best 5 scores out of the 6 events as their final overall Championship score.
