= 2013 Scottish Rally Championship =

Seasons
- ← 2012 2014 →

The Scottish Rally Championship is a rallying series run throughout Scotland over the course of a year, that comprises seven gravel rallies and one tarmac event. Points are awarded to the top placed drivers and the driver scoring the highest number of points over the season is declared Champion

David Bogie begins the year as defending champion after winning five out of the eight events in 2012.

For season 2013, the championship will be sponsored by ARR Craib Transport Ltd, an Aberdeen based road haulage and logistics company. This is a one-year deal announced in December 2012.

The 2013 season begins in the snow-covered forest tracks around Inverness on 16 February, with the season finale taking place around Perth on 5 October.

Following the Colin McRae Forest Stages Rally in October, David Bogie and his regular co-driver Kevin Rae were declared 2013 Scottish rally champions. This represents a record breaking fifth title in a row for the pair. The award ceremony took place on 30 November 2013 at the Marriott Hotel in Glasgow.

== Thistle Snowman Rally ==
The opening event of the season, the Thistle Snowman Rally was abandoned due to an accident involving a competing car, which left the road and killed a 50-year-old spectator.

On 12 March 2013, series organisers announced that the Galloway Hills Rally – a reserve event when the championship calendar was first announced – would be included as the championship finale.

== 2013 Calendar ==
For season 2013 there are to be 8 events held on a variety of surfaces.

Round	Dates	Event	Rally HQ	Surface	Website
–	16 Feb	Arnold Clark Thistle Snowman Rally	Inverness	Gravel / Snow	(website)
1	23 Mar	Brick & Steel Border Counties Rally	Jedburgh	Gravel	(website)
2	20 Apr	Coltel Granite City Rally	Aberdeen	Gravel	(website)
3	2 Jun	Jim Clark Reivers Rally	Kelso	Asphalt	(website)
4	29 Jun	RSAC Scottish Rally	Dumfries	Gravel	(website)
5	3 Aug	Speyside Stages	Elgin	Gravel	(website)
6	7 Sept	Merrick Stages	Wigtown	Gravel	(website)
7	5 Oct	Colin McRae Forest Stages	Aberfeldy	Gravel	(website)
8	27 Oct	Galloway Hills Rally	Castle Douglas	Gravel	(website)

== 2013 results ==
Round	Rally name	Podium finishers			
Round	Rally name	Placing	Driver / Co-Driver	Car	Time
–	Arnold Clark Thistle Snowman Rally (16 Feb)	1	Rally abandoned		
–	Arnold Clark Thistle Snowman Rally (16 Feb)	2	Rally abandoned		
–	Arnold Clark Thistle Snowman Rally (16 Feb)	3	Rally abandoned		
1	Brick & Steel Border Counties Rally (23 Mar)	1	Quintin Milne / Martin Forrest	Mitsubishi Lancer Evolution IX	38:27
1	Brick & Steel Border Counties Rally (23 Mar)	2	Barry Groundwater / Neil Shanks	Mitsubishi Lancer Evolution IX	+1:07
1	Brick & Steel Border Counties Rally (23 Mar)	3	Stephen Petch / Michael Wilkinson*	Mitsubishi Lancer Evolution IX	+1:16
2	Coltel Granite City Rally (20 Apr)	1	David Bogie / Kevin Rae	Ford Focus WRC	42:25
2	Coltel Granite City Rally (20 Apr)	2	Chris Collie / Lisa Watson	Mitsubishi Lancer Evolution VI	+1:24
2	Coltel Granite City Rally (20 Apr)	3	Mike Faulkner / Peter Foy	Mitsubishi Lancer Evolution IX	+1:25
3	Jim Clark Reivers Rally (2 Jun)	1	David Bogie / Kevin Rae	Ford Focus WRC	48:04
3	Jim Clark Reivers Rally (2 Jun)	2	Euan Thorburn / Paul Beaton	Ford Focus WRC	+0:10.4
3	Jim Clark Reivers Rally (2 Jun)	3	Barry Groundwater / Neil Shanks	Mitsubishi Lancer Evolution IX	+2:03.9
4	RSAC Scottish Rally (29 Jun)	1	Euan Thorburn / Paul Beaton	Ford Focus WRC	35:44.6
4	RSAC Scottish Rally (29 Jun)	2	David Bogie / Kevin Rae	Ford Focus WRC	+0:19.5
4	RSAC Scottish Rally (29 Jun)	3	Quintin Milne / Martin Forrest	Mitsubishi Lancer Evolution IX	+1:10.8
5	Speyside Stages (3 Aug)	1	David Bogie / Kevin Rae	Ford Focus WRC	42:25
5	Speyside Stages (3 Aug)	2	Euan Thorburn / Paul Beaton	Ford Focus WRC	+0:17
5	Speyside Stages (3 Aug)	3	Quintin Milne / Martin Forrest	Mitsubishi Lancer Evolution IX	+1:44
6	Merrick Stages (Sept 7)	1	Euan Thorburn / Paul Beaton	Ford Focus WRC	42:22
6	Merrick Stages (Sept 7)	2	David Bogie / Kevin Rae	Ford Focus WRC	+0:44
6	Merrick Stages (Sept 7)	3	Quintin Milne / Martin Forrest	Mitsubishi Lancer Evolution IX	+1:24
7	Colin McRae Forest Stages (5 Oct)	1	David Bogie / Kevin Rae	Ford Focus WRC	43:45
7	Colin McRae Forest Stages (5 Oct)	2	Mike Faulkner / Peter Foy	Mitsubishi Lancer Evolution IX	+2:17
7	Colin McRae Forest Stages (5 Oct)	3	Dave Weston / Dave Robson	Ford Focus WRC	+2:39
8	Galloway Hills Rally (27 Oct)	1	Jock Armstrong / John Richardson	Subaru Impreza	47:20
8	Galloway Hills Rally (27 Oct)	2	Mike Faulkner / Peter Foy	Mitsubishi Lancer Evolution IX	+1:25
8	Galloway Hills Rally (27 Oct)	3	Shaun Sinclair / Chris Hamill	Mitsubishi Lancer Evolution IX	+2:10

^{* Not registered for SRC points.}

== Drivers' championship standings (Top 10) ==
Pos	Driver	Car	TSR	BCR	GCR	JCR	SCO	GSS	MFS	CMFS	GHR	Points
1	David Bogie	Ford Focus WRC	–	3*	1	1	2	1	2	1	Ret*	176
2	Quintin Milne	Mitsubishi Lancer Evolution IX	–	1	4	6	3	3	3	Ret*	DNS*	161
3	Mike Faulkner	Mitsubishi Lancer Evolution IX	–	6	3	Ret*	7	8*	5	2	2	159
4	Barry Groundwater	Mitsubishi Lancer Evolution IX	–	2	5	3	5	10*	Ret*	6	4	158
5	Donnie MacDonald	Mitsubishi Lancer Evolution IX	–	5	6	8	15*	7	12*	4	5	150
6	Euan Thorburn	Ford Focus WRC	–	11	Ret	2	1	2	1	Ret*	DNS*	136
7	Dougal Brown	Mitsubishi Lancer Evolution IX	–	9	12*	17	12	Ret*	10	11	10	124
8	Chris Collie	Mitsubishi Lancer Evolution IV	–	8	2	16	9	27	11	Ret*	Ret*	122
9	John McClory	Subaru Impreza	–	7	Ret*	18	17	DNS*	13	12	9	118
10	Alistair Inglis	Mitsubishi Lancer Evolution V	–	Ret	8	4	13	DNS*	7	7	Ret*	116
Pos	Driver	Car	TSR	BCR	GCR	JCR	SCO	GSS	MFS	CMFS	GHR	Points

Colour	Result
Gold	Winner
Silver	2nd place
Bronze	3rd place
Green	Non-podium finish
Purple	Did not finish (DNF)
Black	Disqualified (DSQ)
Blank	Did not start (DNS)
Blue	Nominated dropped points
*	Joker played

Points are awarded to the highest placed registered driver on each event as follows: 30, 28, 27, 26, and so on down to 1 point. At the end of the Championship, competitors will nominate their best 6 scores out of the 8 events as their final overall Championship score.
