= 2023 Scottish Rally Championship =

The Motorsport UK Scottish Rally Championship is a rallying series run throughout Scotland over the course of a year that comprises both gravel and tarmac surface rallies. The 2023 series will commence on the forest tracks around Inverness on 4 March with the season finale due to take place in Kielder Forest, Northumberland on 21 October. The championship will be sponsored by KNC Groundworks for the fifth year in succession.

Following the Carlisle Stages Rally in October David Henderson and regular co-driver Chris Lees were declared 2023 champions having won four of the eight events in their Ford Fiesta Rally2.

== 2023 calendar ==
For season 2023 there will be eight events held on both gravel and tarmac surfaces.

Round	Dates	Event	Rally HQ	Surface	Website
1	4 March	Snowman Rally	Inverness	Gravel / Snow	(website)
2	21–22 April	Speyside Stages Rally	Elgin	Gravel	(website)
3	28 May	Jim Clark Reivers Rally	Duns	Tarmac	(website)
4	23–24 June	Argyll Rally	Dunoon	Tarmac	(website)
5	22 July	RSAC Scottish Rally	Moffat	Gravel	(website)
6	12 August	Grampian Forest Rally	Banchory	Gravel	(website)
7	16 September	Galloway Hills Rally	Castle Douglas	Gravel	(website)
8	21 October	Carlisle Stages Rally	Kielder	Gravel	(website)

== 2023 events podium ==
Round	Rally name	Podium finishers			
Round	Rally name	Placing	Driver / Co-Driver	Car	Time / Diff leader
1	Snowman Rally (4 March)	1	Jock Armstrong / Hannah McKillop	Subaru Impreza	43:46
1	Snowman Rally (4 March)	2	John Wink / Neil Shanks	Hyundai i20 R5	+0:09
1	Snowman Rally (4 March)	3	Michael Binnie / Claire Mole	Mitsubishi Lancer Evo IX	+0:15
2	Speyside Stages Rally (21 / 22 April)	1	Finlay Retson / Paul Beaton	Ford Fiesta R5	50:40
2	Speyside Stages Rally (21 / 22 April)	2	Jock Armstrong / Hannah Mckillop	Subaru Impreza	+0:29
2	Speyside Stages Rally (21 / 22 April)	3	John Wink / Neil Shanks	Hyundai i20 R5	+0:34
3	Jim Clark Reivers Rally (28 May)	1	David Henderson / Chris Lees	Ford Fiesta Rally2	34:50.5
3	Jim Clark Reivers Rally (28 May)	2	Hugh Brunton / Drew Sturrock	Škoda Fabia RS Rally2	+00:51.3
3	Jim Clark Reivers Rally (28 May)	3	Rory Young / Allan Cathers	Citroën DS3 Rally 2	+01:01.1
4	Argyll Rally (23 / 24 June)	1	Rory Young / Allan Cathers	Citroën DS3 Rally 2	57:53
4	Argyll Rally (23 / 24 June)	2	Mark McCulloch / Michael Hendry	Proton Satria EVO	+00:27
4	Argyll Rally (23 / 24 June)	3	Michael Binnie / Claire Mole	Mitsubishi Lancer Evo IX	+01:32
5	RSAC Scottish Rally (22 July)	1	Jock Armstrong / Hannah McKillop	Subaru Impreza	43:09
5	RSAC Scottish Rally (22 July)	2	Michael Binnie / Claire Mole	Ford Fiesta R5	+0:05
5	RSAC Scottish Rally (22 July)	3	David Henderson / Chris Lees	Ford Fiesta Rally2	+0:57
6	Grampian Forest Rally (12 August)	1	David Henderson / Chris Lees	Ford Fiesta Rally2	45:52
6	Grampian Forest Rally (12 August)	2	Mark McCulloch / Michael Hendry	Proton Satria EVO	+0:03
6	Grampian Forest Rally (12 August)	3	Jock Armstrong / Hannah McKillop	Subaru Impreza	+0:05
7	Galloway Hills Rally (16 September)	1	David Henderson / Chris Lees	Ford Fiesta Rally2	1:00:10
7	Galloway Hills Rally (16 September)	2	Jock Armstrong / Hannah McKillop	Subaru Impreza	+0:22
7	Galloway Hills Rally (16 September)	3	Barry Groundwater/ Charlotte McDowall	Subaru Impreza WRC	+3:24
8	Carlisle Stages Rally (21 October)	1	David Henderson / Chris Lees	Ford Fiesta Rally2	40:27
8	Carlisle Stages Rally (21 October)	2	John Wink / Neil Shanks	Hyundai i20 R5	+0:07
8	Carlisle Stages Rally (21 October)	3	Mark McCulloch / Michael Hendry	Proton Satria EVO	+0:41

== Competitors Points Classification ==
Points are awarded to the highest placed registered competitor on each event as follows: 30, 28, 27, 26, and so on down to 1 point. At the end of the Championship, competitors will count their best 5 scores out of the 8 events as their final overall Championship score.

Driver Overall

Pos	Driver	Car	SNO	SSR	JCR	ARG	SCO	GFR	GHR	CSR	Points
1	David Henderson	Ford Fiesta Rally2	Ret	25	30	Ret	27	30	30	30	147
2	Jock Armstrong	Subaru Impreza	30	28	24	25	30	27	28	24	143
3	John Wink	Hyundai i20 R5	28	27	23	26	26	25	27	28	136
4	Michael Binnie	Ford Fiesta R5 Mitsubishi Lancer Evo	27	26	Ret	27	28	Ret	26	Ret	134
5	Mark McCulloch	Proton Satria Evo S2000	17	23	26	28	DNS	28	11	27	132
Pos	Driver	Car	SNO	SSR	JCR	ARG	SCO	GFR	GHR	CSR	Pts

Colour	Result
Gold	Winner
Silver	2nd place
Bronze	3rd place
Green	Non-podium finish
Purple	Did not finish (DNF)
Black	Disqualified (DSQ)
Blank	Did not start (DNS)
Blue	Nominated dropped points

Co-Driver Overall

Pos	Co-Driver	SNO	SSR	JCR	ARG	SCO	GFR	GHR	CSR	Points
1	Chris Lees	Ret	26	28	Ret	27	30	30	30	145
2	Hannah McKillop	30	28	22	25	30	27	28	25	143
3	Neil Shanks	28	DNS	21	26	26	25	27	28	135
4	Michael Hendry	17	24	24	28	DNS	28	17	27	131
5	Michael Wilkinson	23	21	23	DNS	25	24	25	26	123
Pos	Co-Driver	SNO	SSR	JCR	ARG	SCO	GFR	GHR	CSR	Pts

Colour	Result
Gold	Winner
Silver	2nd place
Bronze	3rd place
Green	Non-podium finish
Purple	Did not finish (DNF)
Black	Disqualified (DSQ)
Blank	Did not start (DNS)
Blue	Nominated dropped points
