= 2017 Scottish Rally Championship =

The Scottish Rally Championship is a rallying series run throughout Scotland over the course of a year, that comprises seven gravel surface events.

The 2017 season began in the snow-covered forest tracks around Inverness on 18 February, with the season finale taking place around Castle Douglas on 9 September. Driver Jock Armstrong and regular co-driver Paula Swinscoe started the season as defending champions having won the 2016 Championship.

Aberdeen based haulage company ARR Craib sponsored the series for the fifth year in a row.

Following the Grampian Stages in August Euan Thorburn and regular co-driver Paul Beaton were declared champions in their Ford Fiesta R5. With only one event left to run the pair were uncatchable in the points table.

== 2017 calendar ==
For season 2017 there was seven events held predominantly on gravel surfaces.

Round	Dates	Event	Rally HQ	Surface	Website
1	18 Feb	Snowman Rally	Inverness	Gravel / Snow	(website)
2	18 Mar	Border Counties Rally	Jedburgh	Gravel	(website)
3	22 Apr	Speyside Stages Rally	Elgin	Gravel	(website)
4	20 May	RSAC Scottish Rally	Dumfries	Gravel	(website)
5	24 Jun	Argyll Rally	Dunoon	Gravel	(website)
6	12 Aug	Grampian Stages Rally	Banchory	Gravel	(website)
7	9 Sep	Galloway Hills Rally	Castle Douglas	Gravel	(website)

=== Calendar changes ===
Due to calendar changes within the British Rally Championship, the Scottish Rally, usually held in June was brought forward to May. June, meanwhile welcomed a new event to the calendar, the Argyll Rally which saw a return to the forests of Cowal after an absence of 14 years.

== 2017 events podium ==
Round	Rally name	Podium finishers			
Round	Rally name	Placing	Driver / Co-Driver	Car	Time / Diff leader
1	Snowman Rally (18 February)	1	David Bogie / Kevin Rae	Škoda Fabia R5	37:51
1	Snowman Rally (18 February)	2	Shaun Sinclair / Jamie Edwards	Subaru Impreza WRC	+0:58
1	Snowman Rally (18 February)	3	Euan Thorburn / Paul Beaton	Ford Fiesta R5	+1:20
2	Border Counties Rally (18 March)	1	Jock Armstrong / Paula Swinscoe	Subaru Impreza	43:32.4
2	Border Counties Rally (18 March)	2	Euan Thorburn / Paul Beaton	Ford Fiesta R5	+0:30.5
2	Border Counties Rally (18 March)	3	Mike Faulkner / Peter Foy	Mitsubishi Lancer Evo IX	+0:30.5
3	Speyside Stages (22 April)	1	David Bogie / Andrew Roughead	Škoda Fabia R5	51:55
3	Speyside Stages (22 April)	2	Desi Henry / Liam Moynihan (Note: Crew was not registered to score points towards the Scottish Rally Championship.)	Škoda Fabia R5	+0:39
3	Speyside Stages (22 April)	3	Euan Thorburn / Paul Beaton	Ford Fiesta R5	+0:42
4	RSAC Scottish Rally (20 May)	1	Euan Thorburn / Paul Beaton	Ford Fiesta R5	42:10.1
4	RSAC Scottish Rally (20 May)	2	Jock Armstrong / Paula Swinscoe	Subaru Impreza	+0:35.2
4	RSAC Scottish Rally (20 May)	3	Shaun Sinclair / Jamie Edwards	Subaru Impreza WRC	+0:58.9
5	Argyll Rally (24 June)	1	Euan Thorburn / Paul Beaton	Ford Fiesta R5	32:38
5	Argyll Rally (24 June)	2	Jock Armstrong / Paula Swinscoe	Subaru Impreza	+0:04
5	Argyll Rally (24 June)	3	Shaun Sinclair / Jamie Edwards	Subaru Impreza WRC	+0:31
6	Grampian Stages Rally (12 August)	1	David Bogie / Kevin Rae	Škoda Fabia R5	41:17
6	Grampian Stages Rally (12 August)	2	Euan Thorburn / Paul Beaton	Ford Fiesta R5	+0:58
6	Grampian Stages Rally (12 August)	3	Paul Bird / Stuart Louden	Ford Focus WRC	+1:21
7	Galloway Hills Rally (9 September)	1	Jock Armstrong / Cameron Fair	Subaru Impreza	39:35
7	Galloway Hills Rally (9 September)	2	Euan Thorburn / Paul Beaton	Ford Fiesta R5	+0:03
7	Galloway Hills Rally (9 September)	3	Shaun Sinclair / Jamie Edwards	Subaru Impreza WRC	+0:44

== Drivers' championship standings ==
Pos	Driver	Car	TSR	BCR	SSR	SCO	ARG	GSR	GHR	Points
1	Euan Thorburn	Ford Fiesta R5	27	28	28	30	30	28	**	171
2	Jock Armstrong	Subaru Impreza	26	30	21*	28	28	27	30	169
3	Shaun Sinclair	Subaru Impreza WRC	28	3*	26	27	27	26	28	162
4	Mike Faulkner	Mitsubishi Lancer Evolution 9	21	27	27	26	25	25	Ret	151
5	Mark McCulloch	Mitsubishi Lancer Evolution 9	22*	25	23	24	26	24	26	148
6	Michael Binnie	Mitsubishi Lancer Evolution 5	Ret	19	17	21	21	21	25	124
7	Donnie Macdonald	Ford Fiesta R5	20	12	22	23	DNS	22	24	123
8	Iain Wilson	Subaru Impreza	16	22	14	Ret	19	18	23	112
9	Simon Hay	Mitsubishi Lancer Evolution 6	15	15	16	19	23	20	Ret	108
10	Rory Young	Ford Fiesta R5	25	26	DNS	25	DNS	DNS	27	103
Pos	Driver	Car	TSR	BCR	SSR	SCO	ARG	GSR	GHR	Points

Colour	Result
Gold	Winner
Silver	2nd place
Bronze	3rd place
Green	Non-podium finish
Purple	Did not finish (DNF)
Black	Disqualified (DSQ)
Blank	Did not start (DNS)
Blue	Nominated dropped points

^{** Euan Thorburn finished second overall on the Galloway Hills Rally but, having already won the SRC title, was not registered for SRC points. This was to avoid affecting championship runner-up positions.}

Points are awarded to the highest placed registered drivers on each event as follows: 30, 28, 27, 26, and so on down to 1 point. At the end of the season, competitors nominate their best 6 scores out of the 7 events as their final overall Championship score.
