= 2010 Scottish Rally Championship =

Seasons
- ← 2009 2011 →

The Scottish Rally Championship is a rallying series run throughout Scotland over the course of a year, that comprises seven gravel rallies and one tarmac event. Points are awarded to the top placed drivers and the driver scoring the highest number of points over the season is declared Champion

The 2010 season began in the snow-covered forest tracks around Inverness on 20 February, with the season finale taking place around Perth on 25 September.

The 2010 Scottish rally Championship was won by David Bogie after winning six of the eight events.

== 2010 Calendar ==
In 2010 there was 8 events on a variety of surfaces.

Round	Dates	Event	Rally HQ	Surface	Website
1	20 February	Arnold Clark Thistle Snowman Rally	Inverness	Gravel / Snow	(website)
2	20 March	Brick & Steel Border Counties Rally	Jedburgh	Gravel	(website)
3	17 April	Station Garage Mitsubishi Granite City Rally	Aberdeen	Gravel	(website)
4	30 May	Jim Clark Reivers Rally	Kelso	Asphalt	(website)
5	26 June	RSAC Scottish Rally	Dumfries	Gravel	(website)
6	7 August	Gleaner Oil & Gas Speyside Stages	Elgin	Gravel	(website)
7	4 September	Merrick Forest Stages	Newton Stewart	Gravel	(website)
8	25 September	Colin McRae Forest Stages	Perth	Gravel	(website)

== 2010 Results ==
Round	Rally name	Podium finishers		
Round	Rally name	Placing	Driver / Co-Driver	Car
1	Arnold Clark Thistle Snowman Rally (20 February)	1	Jock Armstrong / Kirsty Riddick	Subaru Impreza
1	Arnold Clark Thistle Snowman Rally (20 February)	2	Alick Kerr / Neil Shanks	Subaru Impreza
1	Arnold Clark Thistle Snowman Rally (20 February)	3	Mike Faulkner / Peter Foy	Mitsubishi Lancer Evo 6
2	Brick & Steel Border Counties Rally (20 March)	1	Shaun Sinclair / Chris Hamill	Mitsubishi Lancer Evo 9
2	Brick & Steel Border Counties Rally (20 March)	2	David Bogie / Kevin Rae	Mitsubishi Lancer Evo 9
2	Brick & Steel Border Counties Rally (20 March)	3	Wayne Sisson / David MacFadyen	Mitsubishi Lancer Evo 9
3	Station Garage Granite City Rally (17 April)	1	David Bogie / Kevin Rae	Mitsubishi Lancer Evo 9
3	Station Garage Granite City Rally (17 April)	2	Jock Armstrong / Kirsty Riddick	Subaru Impreza
3	Station Garage Granite City Rally (17 April)	3	Mike Faulkner / Peter Foy	Mitsubishi Lancer Evo 6
4	Jim Clark Reivers Rally (30 May)	1	David Bogie / Kevin Rae	Ford Focus WRC
4	Jim Clark Reivers Rally (30 May)	2	Jock Armstrong / Christine Sanderson	Subaru Impreza
4	Jim Clark Reivers Rally (30 May)	3	Paul Benn / Richard Cooke	Ford Focus WRC
5	RSAC Scottish Rally (26 June)	1	David Bogie / Kevin Rae	Mitsubishi Lancer Evo 9
5	RSAC Scottish Rally (26 June)	2	Mike Faulkner / Peter Foy	Mitsubishi Lancer Evo 6
5	RSAC Scottish Rally (26 June)	3	David Wilson / Drew Sturrock	Mitsubishi Lancer Evo 9
6	Gleaner Oil & Gas Speyside Stages (7 August)	1	David Bogie / Kevin Rae	Mitsubishi Lancer Evo 9
6	Gleaner Oil & Gas Speyside Stages (7 August)	2	Jock Armstrong / Kirsty Riddick	Subaru Impreza
6	Gleaner Oil & Gas Speyside Stages (7 August)	3	Alick Kerr / Dave Robson	Subaru Impreza
7	Merrick Forest Stages (4 September)	1	David Bogie / Kevin Rae	Mitsubishi Lancer Evo 9
7	Merrick Forest Stages (4 September)	2	Jock Armstrong / Kirsty Riddick	Subaru Impreza
7	Merrick Forest Stages (4 September)	3	Alick Kerr / Neil Shanks	Subaru Impreza
8	Colin McRae Forest Stages (25 September)	1	David Bogie / Kevin Rae	Mitsubishi Lancer Evo 9
8	Colin McRae Forest Stages (25 September)	2	Alick Kerr / Neil Shanks	Subaru Impreza
8	Colin McRae Forest Stages (25 September)	3	Paul Benn / Richard Cooke	Ford Focus WRC

== Drivers Points Classification ==
Pos	Driver	TSR	BCR	GCR	JCR	SCO	SS	MFS	CMFS	Pts
1	David Bogie	DNS*	2*	1	1	1	1	1	1	180
2	Jock Armstrong	1	Ret*	2	2	Ret*	2	2	4	168
3	Alick Kerr	2	4	5*	Ret*	4	3	3	2	162
4	Mike Faulkner	3	Ret*	3	9	2	6	6	24*	151
5	Wayne Sisson	Ret*	3	9*	5	9	5	8	5	145
6	Shaun Sinclair	13	1	Ret*	7	7	9	5	Ret*	139
7	Barry Groundwater	25*	7	8	DNS*	5	7	10	9	134
8	Paul Benn	DNS*	DNS	6	3	DNS*	4	4	3	130
9	Andy Horne	5	5	7	14	6	Ret*	16	DNS*	127
10	Donnie Macdonald	Ret*	13	13	19*	8	11	7	6	122
Pos	Driver	TSR	BCR	GCR	JCR	SCO	SS	MFS	CMFS	Pts

Colour	Result
Gold	Winner
Silver	2nd place
Bronze	3rd place
Green	Non-podium finish
Purple	Did not finish (DNF)
Black	Disqualified (DSQ)
Blank	Did not start (DNS)
Blue	Nominated dropped points
*	Joker played

Points are awarded to the highest placed registered drivers on each event as follows: 30, 28, 27, 26, and so on down to 1 point. At the end of the season, competitors nominate their best 6 scores out of the 8 events as their final overall Championship score.
