= 2022 Scottish Rally Championship =

The Motorsport UK Scottish Rally Championship is a rallying series run throughout Scotland over the course of a year that comprises both gravel and tarmac surface rallies. The 2022 series began on the forest tracks around Inverness on 5 March with the season finale due to take place in Kielder Forest, Northumberland on 22 October. The championship will be sponsored by KNC Groundworks for the fourth year in succession.

Following the Galloway Hills Rally in September, driver David Bogie was declared champion after winning five of the seven events thus far.

== 2022 calendar ==
For season 2022 there will be eight events held on both gravel and tarmac surfaces.

Round	Dates	Event	Rally HQ	Surface	Website
1	5 March	Snowman Rally	Muir of Ord	Gravel / Snow	(website)
2	23 April	Speyside Stages Rally	Elgin	Gravel	(website)
3	29 May	Jim Clark Reivers Rally	Duns	Tarmac	(website)
4	24 / 25 Jun	Argyll Rally	Dunoon	Tarmac	(website)
5	23 July	RSAC Scottish Rally	Moffat	Gravel	(website)
6	13 August	Grampian Forest Rally	Banchory	Gravel	(website)
7	10 September	Galloway Hills Rally	Castle Douglas	Gravel	(website)
8	22 October	Carlisle Stages Rally	Kielder	Gravel	(website)

== 2022 events podium ==
Round	Rally name	Podium finishers			
Round	Rally name	Placing	Driver / Co-Driver	Car	Time / Diff leader
1	Snowman Rally (5 March)	1	Michael Binnie / Claire Mole	Mitsubishi Lancer Evo IX	42:00
1	Snowman Rally (5 March)	2	Jock Armstrong / Cameron Fair	Subaru Impreza	+0:19
1	Snowman Rally (5 March)	3	David Bogie / Kevin Rae	Mini John Cooper Works WRC	+0:30
2	Speyside Stages Rally (23 April)	1	David Bogie / Barney Mitchell	Mini John Cooper Works WRC	37:15
2	Speyside Stages Rally (23 April)	2	Jock Armstrong / Cameron Fair	Subaru Impreza	+0:20
2	Speyside Stages Rally (23 April)	3	Michael Binnie / Claire Mole	Mitsubishi Lancer Evo IX	+0:46
3	Jim Clark Reivers Rally (29 May)	1	David Bogie / John Rowan	Mini John Cooper Works WRC	37:19.4
3	Jim Clark Reivers Rally (29 May)	2	Michael Binnie / Claire Mole	Mitsubishi Lancer Evo IX	+0:43.5
3	Jim Clark Reivers Rally (29 May)	3	Mark McCulloch / Michael Hendry	Proton Satria Evo	+01:05.0
4	Argyll Rally (24 / 25 June)	1	David Bogie / Cameron Fair	Mini John Cooper Works WRC	53:44
4	Argyll Rally (24 / 25 June)	2	David Henderson / Chris Lees	Ford Fiesta R5	+1:13
4	Argyll Rally (24 / 25 June)	3	Michael Binnie / Claire Mole	Mitsubishi Lancer Evo IX	+1:34
5	RSAC Scottish Rally (23 July)	1	Michael Binnie / Claire Mole	Mitsubishi Lancer Evo IX	42:20
5	RSAC Scottish Rally (23 July)	2	Hugh Brunton / Drew Sturrock	Ford Fiesta R5	+0:45
5	RSAC Scottish Rally (23 July)	3	David Henderson/ Chris Lees	Ford Fiesta Rally2	+1:34
6	Grampian Forest Rally (13 August)	1	David Bogie / John Rowan	Ford Fiesta Rally2	40:58
6	Grampian Forest Rally (13 August)	2	David Henderson / Chris Lees	Ford Fiesta Rally2	+0:19
6	Grampian Forest Rally (13 August)	3	Hugh Brunton / Drew Sturrock	Ford Fiesta R5	+0:49
7	Galloway Hills Rally (10 September)	1	David Henderson / Chris Lees	Ford Fiesta Rally2	41:37
7	Galloway Hills Rally (10 September)	2	David Bogie / John Rowan	Ford Fiesta Rally2	+0:35
7	Galloway Hills Rally (10 September)	3	Jock Armstrong / Cameron Fair	Subaru Impreza	+0:57
8	Carlisle Stages Rally (22 October)	1	Jock Armstrong / Cameron Fair	Subaru Impreza	43:48
8	Carlisle Stages Rally (22 October)	2	Angus Lawrie / Paul Gribben	Mitsubishi Lancer Evo IX	+ 0:09
8	Carlisle Stages Rally (22 October)	3	John Wink / Neil Shanks	Hyundai i20 R5	+0:10

== Drivers Points Classification ==
Pos	Driver	Car	SNO	SSR	JCR	ARG	SCO	GFR	GHR	CSR	Points
1	David Bogie	Mini Cooper WRC / Ford Fiesta Rally2	27	30	30	30	DNF	30	28	DNS	175
2	Michael Binnie	Mitsubishi EVO 9	30	27	28	27	30	DNF	DNF	26	168
3	Angus Lawrie	Mitsubishi Evo 9	DNF	20	23	20	26	24	26	28	147
4	Mark McCulloch	Proton Satria Evo S2000	DNF	22	27	22	24	25	24	23	145
5	Hugh Brunton	Ford Fiesta R5	22	19	DNF	23	28	27	23	4	142
Pos	Driver	Car	SNO	SSR	JCR	ARG	SCO	GFR	GHR	CSR	Pts

Colour	Result
Gold	Winner
Silver	2nd place
Bronze	3rd place
Green	Non-podium finish
Purple	Did not finish (DNF)
Black	Disqualified (DSQ)
Blank	Did not start (DNS)
Blue	Nominated dropped points

Points are awarded to the highest placed registered driver on each event as follows: 30, 28, 27, 26, and so on down to 1 point. At the end of the Championship, competitors will count their best 6 scores out of the 8 events as his/her final overall Championship score.

=== Co-Drivers Points Classification ===
Pos	Co-Driver	SNO	SSR	JCR	ARG	SCO	GFR	GHR	CSR	Points
1	Cameron fair	28	30	24	30	DNS	DNF	27	30	169
1=	Clare Mole	30	28	28	27	30	DNF	DNF	26	169
3	Chris Lees	DNF	27	15	28	27	28	30	DNF	155
4	Paul Gribben	DNF	23	23	22	26	24	26	28	150
5	Michael Hendry	DNF	24	27	24	24	25	24	25	149
Pos	Co-Driver	SNO	SSR	JCR	ARG	SCO	GFR	GHR	CSR	Pts
