= 2020 Scottish Rally Championship =

Motor racing competition

The Scottish Rally Championship is a rallying series run throughout Scotland over the course of a year, that comprises both gravel and tarmac surface rallies. The 2020 series began on the forest tracks around Inverness on 7 March, with the season finale due to take place around Dalbeattie on 19 September.

== Series Cancellation ==
On 24 March 2020, due to the ongoing COVID-19 pandemic Organisers of the KNC Groundworks Scottish Rally Championship took the decision to cancel the 2020 championship. The coronavirus pandemic continued to spread leading to a number of events being cancelled. With round 1, the Snowman Rally, being the only event to take place thus far it was decided that the results of that event would stand but the championship points would be null and void.

== 2020 calendar ==
For season 2020 there were. scheduled to be seven events held predominantly on gravel surfaces. In January 2020 the organising team of the Argyll Rally scheduled to take place in June, announced that the 2020 event would not take place. The change from a forest rally to a closed road event meant that the event organisers were unable to secure the relevant authorisations within the timeframe available. Due to the COVID-19 pandemic the organisers of the Speyside Stages Rally, the Jim Clark rally, the Scottish Rally, the Grampian Stages Rally and the Galloway Hills rally announced that the events would be cancelled.

Round	Dates	Event	Rally HQ	Surface
1	7 March	Snowman Rally	Inverness	Gravel
Cancelled due to the COVID-19 pandemic
Original Date	Event		Rally HQ	Surface
18 April	Speyside Stages Rally		Elgin	Gravel
31 May	Jim Clark Reivers Rally		Duns	Tarmac
6 June	RSAC Scottish Rally		Moffat	Gravel
20 June	Argyll Rally		Dunoon	Tarmac
8 August	Grampian Stages Rally		Banchory	Gravel
19 September	Galloway Hills Rally		Dalbeattie	Gravel

== 2020 events podium ==
Round	Rally name	Podium finishers			
Round	Rally name	Placing	Driver / Co-Driver	Car	Time / Diff leader
1	Snowman Rally (7 March)	1	Michael Binnie / Claire Mole	Mitsubishi Lancer Evo IX	45:33
1	Snowman Rally (7 March)	2	Jock Armstrong / Cameron Fair	Subaru Impreza	+0:20
1	Snowman Rally (7 March)	3	Freddie Milne / Patrick Walsh	Ford Fiesta R5	+0:23
