= 2016 Scottish Rally Championship =

Seasons
- ← 2015 2017 →

The Scottish Rally Championship is a rallying series run throughout Scotland over the course of a year, that comprises seven gravel surface events.

The 2016 season begins in the snow-covered forest tracks around Inverness on 20 February, with the season finale taking place around Castle Douglas on 10 September. Driver Jock Armstrong and regular co-driver Paula Swinscoe will start the season as defending champions having won the 2015 Championship.

Aberdeen based haulage company ARR Craib will sponsor the series for the fourth year in a row.

Alongside the main championship, 2016 will see a number of initiatives run over the course of the year including the following:

- Scottish 2WD Rally Championship - Open to registered 2 Wheel drive cars
- SRC Juniors - Open to registered young drivers and co-drivers
- SRC Ladies - Open to registered female crews
- SRC Subaru cup - Open to registered Subaru cars
- SRC 205 Cup - Open to registered Peugeot 205 and Citroen C2 cars

== 2016 calendar ==
For season 2016 there is to be seven events held predominantly on gravel surfaces.

Round	Dates	Event	Rally HQ	Surface	Website
1	20 Feb	The Snowman Rally	Inverness	Gravel / Snow	(website)
2	19 Mar	Border Counties Rally	Jedburgh	Gravel	(website)
3	23 Apr	Speyside Stages Rally	Elgin	Gravel	(website)
-	5 Jun	Jim Clark Reivers Rally	Kelso	Gravel	(website)
4	25 Jun	RSAC Scottish Rally	Dumfries	Gravel	(website)
5	13 Aug	Grampian Stages Rally	Aberdeen	Gravel	(website)
6	10 Sep	Galloway Hills Rally	Castle Douglas	Gravel	(website)

=== Calendar changes ===
On 24 May, the Jim Clark Reivers Forest Rally Rally management team announced via a press release that the 2016 event – usually round 4 of the championship and held in June, would not take place. Insufficient entries was cited as the reason.

== 2016 events podium ==
Round	Rally name	Podium finishers			
Round	Rally name	Placing	Driver / Co-Driver	Car	Time / Diff leader
1	Snowman Rally (20 February)	1	Donnie Macdonald / Andrew Falconer	Mitsubishi Lancer Evolution 9	50:15
1	Snowman Rally (20 February)	2	Dale Robertson / Stuart Louden	Mitsubishi Lancer Evolution 9	+0:07
1	Snowman Rally (20 February)	3	Quintin Milne / Sean Donnelly (Note: Crew was not registered to score points towards the Scottish Rally Championship.)	Mitsubishi Lancer Evolution 9	+0:30
2	Border Counties Rally (19 March)	1	Jock Armstrong / Paula Swinscoe	Subaru Impreza	41:17
2	Border Counties Rally (19 March)	2	Garry Pearson / Robbie Mitchell	Ford Fiesta R5	+0:00 (Note: Per the championship's sporting regulations, Armstrong was awarded victory over Pearson after recording a faster time on the first stage)
2	Border Counties Rally (19 March)	3	Shaun Sinclair / Kirsty Riddick	Ford Focus WRC	+0:07
3	Speyside Stages (23 April)	1	Garry Pearson / Robbie Mitchell	Ford Fiesta R5	42:32
3	Speyside Stages (23 April)	2	Jock Armstrong / Paula Swinscoe	Subaru Impreza	+0:08
3	Speyside Stages (23 April)	3	Mike Faulkner / Peter Foy	Mitsubishi Lancer EVO IX	+0:41
–	Jim Clark Reivers Rally (5 June)	1	Rally cancelled		
–	Jim Clark Reivers Rally (5 June)	2	Rally cancelled		
–	Jim Clark Reivers Rally (5 June)	3	Rally cancelled		
4	RSAC Scottish Rally (25 June)	1	Garry Pearson / Robbie Mitchell	Ford Fiesta R5	54:07.4
4	RSAC Scottish Rally (25 June)	2	Jock Armstrong / Paula Swinscoe	Subaru Impreza	+0:12.9
4	RSAC Scottish Rally (25 June)	3	Mike Faulkner / Peter Foy	Mitsubishi Lancer EVO IX	+0:13.8
5	Grampian Stages Rally (13 August)	1	Dave Weston Jnr / Aled Davies	Subaru Impreza WRC	42:47
5	Grampian Stages Rally (13 August)	2	John MacCrone / Rhianon Gelsomino	Ford Fiesta R5	+0:06
5	Grampian Stages Rally (13 August)	3	Euan Thorburn / Paul Beaton	Peugeot 208 R5	+0:21
6	Galloway Hills Rally (10 September)	1	Jock Armstrong / Paula Swinscoe	Subaru Impreza	38:39
6	Galloway Hills Rally (10 September)	2	Mike Faulkner / Peter Foy	Mitsubishi Lancer EVO IX	+0:57
6	Galloway Hills Rally (10 September)	3	Mark McCulloch / Michael Hendry	Mitsubishi Lancer EVO IX	+1:28

== Drivers' championship standings ==
Pos	Driver	Car	TSR	BCR	SSR	JCR	SCO	GSR	GHR	Points
1	Jock Armstrong	Subaru Impreza	11	1	2	–	2	3	1	143
2	Garry Pearson	Ford Fiesta R5	4	2	1	–	1	2	Ret	142
3	Mike Faulkner	Mitsubishi Lancer EVO 9	12	4	3	–	3	7	2	131
4	Mark McCulloch	Mitsubishi Lancer EVO 9	3	5	7	–	4	4	3	131
5	Bruce McCombie	Mitsubishi Lancer EVO	6	6	5	–	6	5	4	124
6	Barry Groundwater	Mitsubishi Lancer EVO X	9	9	10	–	7	6	DNS	109
7	Scott McCombie	Mitsubishi Lancer EVO 9	7	13	Ret	–	8	8	9	105
8	Alasdair S Graham	Mitsubishi Lancer EVO	22	12	14	–	11	12	7	94
9	Donnie MacDonald	Mitsubishi Lancer EVO 9	1	8	11	–	10	DNS	DNS	91
10	Iain Wilson	Subaru Impreza N12	15	18	17	–	13	9	6	90
Pos	Driver	Car	TSR	BCR	SSR	JCR	SCO	GSR	GHR	Points

Colour	Result
Gold	Winner
Silver	2nd place
Bronze	3rd place
Green	Non-podium finish
Purple	Did not finish (DNF)
Black	Disqualified (DSQ)
Blank	Did not start (DNS)
Blue	Nominated dropped points
*	Joker played

Points are awarded to the highest placed registered drivers on each event as follows: 30, 28, 27, 26, and so on down to 1 point. At the end of the season, competitors nominate their best 5 scores out of the 6 events as their final overall Championship score.
