= 2021 Scottish Rally Championship =

The Scottish Rally Championship is a rallying series run throughout Scotland over the course of a year, that comprises both gravel and tarmac surface rallies. The 2021 series was to begin on the forest tracks around Inverness on 6 March, with the season finale due to take place around Dalbeattie on 11 September.

== 2021 calendar ==
For season 2021 there was to be seven events held on both gravel and tarmac surfaces. The 2021 reserve event will be the Carlisle Stages Rally in October.

=== Calendar Changes ===
The first three rounds of the series, the Snowman Rally, the Speyside Stages and the Jim Clark Reivers Rally have been cancelled due to the ongoing COVID-19 pandemic.

Round	Dates	Event	Rally HQ	Surface	Website
1	25/26 June	Argyll Rally	Dunoon	Tarmac	(website)
2	24 July	RSAC Scottish Rally	Lockerbie	Gravel	(website)
3	14 Aug	Grampian Forest Rally	Banchory	Gravel	(website)
4	11 Sep	Galloway Hills Rally	Dalbeattie	Gravel	(website)
5	23 Oct	Carlisle Stages Rally	Carlisle	Gravel	(website)
Cancelled due to the COVID-19 pandemic
	Original Date	Event	Rally HQ	Surface	Website
-	6 Mar	Snowman Rally	Inverness	Gravel / Snow	(website)
-	17 Apr	Speyside Stages Rally	Elgin	Gravel	(website)
-	30 May	Jim Clark Reivers Rally	Duns	Tarmac	(website)

== 2021 events podium ==
Round	Rally name	Scottish Rally Championship Podium finishers			
Round	Rally name	Placing	Driver / Co-Driver	Car	Time / Diff leader
-	Snowman Rally (Cancelled)	1			
-	Snowman Rally (Cancelled)	2			
-	Snowman Rally (Cancelled)	3			
-	Speyside Stages Rally (Cancelled)	1			
-	Speyside Stages Rally (Cancelled)	2			
-	Speyside Stages Rally (Cancelled)	3			
-	Jim Clark Reivers Rally (Cancelled)	1			
-	Jim Clark Reivers Rally (Cancelled)	2			
-	Jim Clark Reivers Rally (Cancelled)	3			
1	Argyll Rally (26 June)	1	Freddie Milne / Patrick Walsh	Ford Fiesta R5	53:12
1	Argyll Rally (26 June)	2	Jock Armstrong / Cameron Fair	Ford Fiesta R2	+1:46
1	Argyll Rally (26 June)	3	Richard Hill / Steffan Evans	Mitsubishi Lancer Evo IX	+3:37
2	RSAC Scottish Rally (24 July)	1	David Bogie / John Rowan	Mini John Cooper Works WRC	0:42:48
2	RSAC Scottish Rally (24 July)	2	Jock Armstrong / Cameron Fair	Ford Fiesta R2	+0:58
2	RSAC Scottish Rally (24 July)	3	Garry Pearson / Niall Burns	Škoda Fabia R5	+1:47
3	Grampian Forest Rally (14 August)	1	Garry Pearson / Niall Burns	Škoda Fabia R5	40:17
3	Grampian Forest Rally (14 August)	2	Jock Armstrong / Cameron Fair	Ford Fiesta R2	+0:25
3	Grampian Forest Rally (14 August)	3	Freddie Milne / Patrick Walsh	Ford Fiesta R5	+1:55
4	Galloway Hills Rally (11 September)	1	David Bogie / John Rowan	Mini John Cooper Works WRC	36:57
4	Galloway Hills Rally (11 September)	2	Garry Pearson / Niall Burns	Skoda Fabia R5	+0:29
4	Galloway Hills Rally (11 September)	3	Scott Beattie / Paula Swinscoe	Mitsubishi Lancer Evo VII	+1:11
5	Carlisle Stages Rally (23 October)	1	Garry Pearson / Niall Burns	Skoda Fabia R5	38:11
5	Carlisle Stages Rally (23 October)	2	Scott Beattie / Paula Swinscoe	Mitsubishi Lancer Evo VII	+1:56
5	Carlisle Stages Rally (23 October)	3	Michael Binnie / Claire Mole	Mitsubishi Lancer Evo IX	+2:12

== Drivers Points Classification ==
Pos	Driver	Car	SNO	SSR	JCR	ARG	SCO	GFR	GHR	CSR	Points
1	Garry Pearson	Ford Fiesta R5/Skoda Fabia R5	-	-	-	DNF*	3	1	2	1	115
2	Jock Armstrong	Ford Fiesta R5	-	-	-	2	2	2	7	DNF*	107
3	Scott Beattie	Mitsubishi EVO 7	-	-	-	DNS*	8	8	3	2	99
4	Ian Forgan	Subaru Impreza/Ford Fiesta R5	-	-	-	6	6	6	5	6*	97
5	Mark McCulloch	Ford Escort RS	-	-	-	4	7	9	9	DNS*	92
Pos	Driver	Car	SNO	SSR	JCR	ARG	SCO	GFR	GHR	CSR	Pts

Colour	Result
Gold	Winner
Silver	2nd place
Bronze	3rd place
Green	Non-podium finish
Purple	Did not finish (DNF)
Black	Disqualified (DSQ)
Blank	Did not start (DNS)
Blue	Nominated dropped points

Points are awarded to the highest placed registered driver on each event as follows: 30, 28, 27, 26, and so on down to 1 point. At the end of the Championship, competitors will count their best 4 scores out of the 5 events as his/her final overall Championship score.
