= Scottish Rally Championship =

- Country: United Kingdom
- Inaugural season: 1968
- Drivers: Varies from event to event
- Tyre suppliers: open
- Drivers' champion: (United Kingdom) Garry Pearson
- Official website: scottishrallychampionship.co.uk/

The Scottish Rally Championship is a rallying series run throughout Scotland over the course of a year, that comprises both gravel and closed surface rallies.

Points are awarded to the top placed drivers and the driver scoring the highest number of points over the season is declared Champion. The championship has always been a breeding ground for many World Rally Championship drivers, including Colin & Alister McRae, Robbie Head and Barry Clark.

Notable previous champions have included Mitsubishi Ralliart founder Andrew Cowan, who won the championship in 1976 in a Colt Lancer, and former World Rally Champion, Colin McRae who performed a giant killing act when he won the series crown in 1988 in his humble Vauxhall Nova.

== Colin McRae Forest Stages Rally 2008 ==
The 2008 season finale, the Colin McRae Forest Stages Rally saw an enhanced entry list of 'rally legends' in honour of Colin who died in 2007. The impressive entry list included ex-World Championship drivers Hannu Mikkola, Ari Vatanen (partnered by his 1981 WRC winning co-driver David Richards), Björn Waldegård, Malcolm Wilson, Russell Brookes, Jimmy McRae, Andrew Cowan and Louise Aitken-Walker, many competing in their original cars. A handful of current WRC drivers also took part including Matthew Wilson and Travis Pastrana. The event was deemed a great success, attracting record spectator numbers to the Perthshire forests. Outright winner was Stobart VK M-Sport Ford Rally Team driver Matthew Wilson in a Ford Focus WRC, with Colin's brother Alister winning the "legends" portion of the rally.

== Champions ==
Season	Driver	Co-Driver	Car (driver)
2026	Garry Pearson	Chris Lees	Škoda Fabia RS Rally2 / Ford Fiesta Rally2
2025	David Bogie	Kirsty Riddick	Škoda Fabia RS Rally2
2024	Euan Thorburn	Keir Beaton	Volkswagen Polo R5
2023	David Henderson	Chris Lees	Ford Fiesta Rally2
2022	David Bogie	Cameron Fair & Claire Mole (joint)	Mini John Cooper Works WRC / Ford Fiesta Rally2
2021	Garry Pearson	Niall Burns	Skoda Fabia R5
2020	cancelled due to COVID-19 pandemic		
2019	Euan Thorburn	Paul Beaton	Ford Focus WRC
2018	Andrew Gallacher	Jane Nicol	Ford Focus WRC
2017	Euan Thorburn	Paul Beaton	Ford Fiesta R5
2016	Jock Armstrong	Robbie Mitchell	Subaru Impreza
2015	Jock Armstrong	Paula Swinscoe	Subaru Impreza
2014	Euan Thorburn	Paul Beaton	Ford Focus WRC
2013	David Bogie	Kevin Rae	Ford Focus WRC
2012	David Bogie	Kevin Rae	Mitsubishi Lancer Evo 9, Metro 6R4
2011	David Bogie	Kevin Rae	Mitsubishi Lancer Evo 9, Metro 6R4
2010	David Bogie	Kevin Rae	Mitsubishi Lancer Evo 9, Ford Focus RS WRC
2009	David Bogie	Kevin Rae	Mitsubishi Lancer Evo 9, Toyota Corolla WRC
2008	Jimmy Girvan	Kirsty Riddick	Subaru Impreza
2007	Gary Adam	Gordon Adam	Subaru Impreza
2006	Dave Weston	Steven Clark	Ford Focus WRC
2005	Barry Johnson	Stewart Merry	Subaru Impreza WRC
2004	Raymond Munro	Stewart Merry	Subaru Impreza WRC
2003	Raymond Munro	Neil Ewing	Subaru Impreza WRC
2002	Barry Johnson	Gordon Adam	Subaru Impreza
2001	cancelled due to outbreak of Foot-and-mouth disease		
2000	Andrew Wood	Ann Parker	Audi 90
1999	Jon Burn	Stan Quirk	MG Metro 6R4
1998	Jimmy Paterson	Fred Bell	Subaru Impreza
1997	Brian Lyall	John Bennie	Subaru Impreza
1996	Jimmy Christie	Murdo Campbell	MG Metro 6R4
1995	David Gillanders	Martin Forrest	Ford Escort RS Cosworth
1994	Michael Horne	Monty Pearson	Ford Sierra RS Cosworth
1993	Murray Grierson	Stewart Merry	MG Metro 6R4
1992	Raymond Munro	Neil Ewing	Ford Sierra RS Cosworth
1991	Donald Milne	Bob Wilson	Nissan Engined Metro 6R4
1990	Jimmy Girvan	Campbell Roy	Toyota Celica GT-Four ST165
1989	Andrew Wood	Campbell Roy	Vauxhall Astra
1988	Colin McRae	Derek Ringer	Vauxhall Nova, Nissan 240RS, Peugeot 205 RWD, Ford Sierra RS Cosworth
1987	Murray Grierson	Roger Anderson	Opel Kadett 400
1986	Ken Wood	Peter Brown	MG Metro 6R4
1985	George Marshall	Roger Anderson	Nissan 240RS
1984	Ken Wood	Peter Brown	Rover Vitesse SD1
1983	Jimmy Fleming	Robin Cunningham	Toyota Celica
1982	Ken Wood	Peter Brown	Triumph TR7 V8
1981	Donald Heggie	Ian Mungall	Ford Escort RS1800
1980	Drew Gallacher	John Eyres	Vauxhall Chevette
1979	Drew Gallacher	David McHarg	Ford Escort
1978	Drew Gallacher	David McHarg	Ford Escort
1977	Charles Samson	Alec Samson	Ford Escort
1976	Andrew Cowan	Hugh McNeill	Colt Lancer
1975	Charles Samson	Alec Samson	Ford Escort
1974	Arthur Jasper	Bill Crabb	Ford Escort
1973	Drew Gallacher	Ian Muir	Ford Escort RS1600
1972	James Rae	Michael Malcolm	Ford Escort RS1600
1971	Bob Watson	Hugh McNeil	Ford Escort Twin Cam
1970	James Rae	Michael Malcolm	Ford Escort 1300 GT
1969	Donald Heggie	George Deans	Escort Twin Cam
1968	Mike Hibbert	Ian Withers	Ford Escort

== See also ==
- World Rally Championship
- British Rally Championship
