= Garry Pearson =

British rally driver

- Nationality: (Scotland) Scottish
- Born: 7 September 1991 (age 35)

Championship titles
- 2021 SRC 2026 SRC 2021 BTRDA: Scottish Rally Champion

Garry Pearson (born 7 September 1991) is a British rally driver from the town of Duns in the Scottish borders. He was Scottish Rally Champion in 2021 and 2026.

== Career ==
Pearson's first event was in 2008 driving a Peugeot 205 GTi where he finished 78th out of a field of 140.

Driving various cars over the years and with varying success he eventually managed a successful year in 2021. That year he and regular co-driver Niall Burns netted four rally championship crowns. They won the Scottish Rally Championship, the Welsh Forest Rally Championship, the BTRDA Rally Series and the Motorsport UK National Rally Championship. Using a Škoda Fabia R5, they were the first crew in history to achieve the quadruple wins.
