= BTRDA Rally Series =

BTRDA Rally Series is a rally series in Great Britain.

The BTRDA (British Trials and Rally Drivers Association) was formed in 1938 by a group of disgruntled participants in the London-Gloucester reliability trials. The event had been promoted as suitable for amateurs with ordinary road cars, but proved so difficult that only two cars completed. Originally, BTRDA organised only sporting trials (first champion listed is Ken Wharton in 1948), only adding rallycross (first champion listed is Trevor Reeves in 1977) and Allrounders championships in the 1970s.

According to The World of Automobiles, the BTRDA event is the most important trials championship in the UK.
