= Euan Thorburn =

British rally driver from Duns (born 1986)

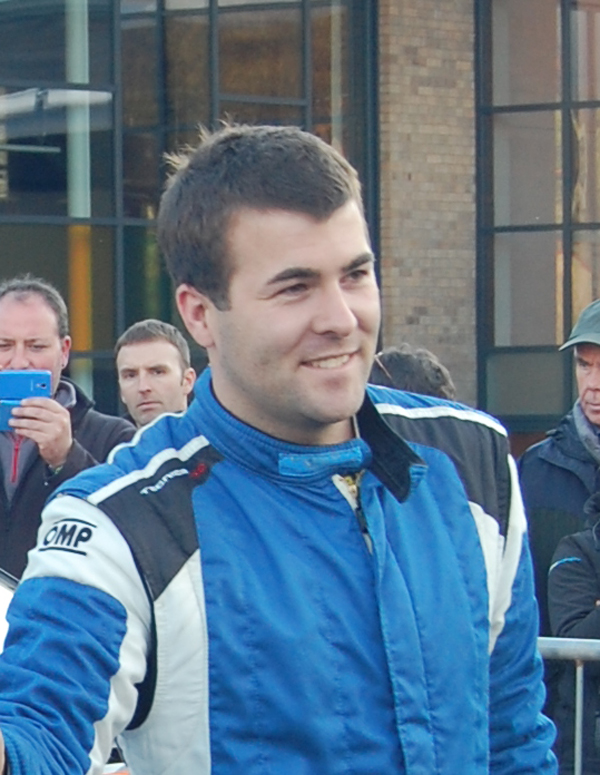
- Nationality: (Scotland) Scottish
- Born: 19 October 1986 (age 40)

Scottish Rally Championship career
- Debut season: 2005
- Co-driver: Paul Beaton

Championship titles
- 2014 SRC 2017 SRC 2019 SRC 2024 SRC 2013 BTRDA 2019 BTRDA: Scottish Rally Champion; BTRDA Rally champion

Euan Thorburn (born 19 October 1986) is a British rally driver from Duns. He was Scottish Rally Champion in 2014, 2017 and 2019 and was the BTRDA (British Trial & Rally Drivers Association) Champion for 2013 and 2019.

== Career ==
Thorburn's first rally was in 2005 at the wheel of a Peugeot 205 on a round of the Scottish Rally Championship. In 2006, he progressed to a Subaru Impreza but it was not until 2010 when he moved to a Mitsubishi EVO and a regular co-driver, Paul Beaton, that he started to achieve successful results culminating in the SRC runner-up position in 2011.

For the 2012 season, the duo made their debut in an ex-Carlos Sainz Ford Focus WRC.

In 2013, Thorburn attempted a full season in both the SRC and the BTRDA championship. A season of mixed fortunes saw him finish fifth overall in the SRC and championship winner of the BTRDA season.

SRC season 2014 saw Thorburn crowned champion after winning four of the eight events.

2016 saw Thorburn and Beaton mount an attack on the British Rally Championship in a Peugeot 208 T16. In a disappointing season they entered three rallies, only managing to finish one. In 2017, the pair entered selected BRC and SRC events in a Ford Fiesta R5. They finished 16th overall in the BRC and took the SRC title for the second time in their careers.

=== Complete World Rally Championship results ===
Year	Entrant	Car	1	2	3	4	5	6	7	8	9	10	11	12	13	WDC	Pts
2014	Euan Thorburn	Ford Fiesta S2000	MON	SWE	MEX	ARG	POR	ITA	POL	FIN	GER	AUS	FRA	ESP	GBR; 25	NC	0
2017	Euan Thorburn	Ford Fiesta R5	MON	SWE	MEX	FRA	ARG	POR	ITA	POL	FIN	GER	ESP	GBR; 27	AUS	NC	0

=== IRC results ===
Year	Entrant	Car	1	2	3	4	5	6	7	8	9	10	11	12	WDC	Points
2010	(United Kingdom) Euan Thorburn	Mitsubishi Evo XI	MON	BRA	ARG	CAN	ITA	BEL	AZO	MAD	CZE	ITA	SCO; Ret	CYP	NC	0

=== ERC results ===
Year	Entrant	Car	1	2	3	4	5	6	7	8	9	10	Pos	Points
2015	Euan Thorburn	Ford Fiesta S2000	JÄN	LIE	IRE; Ret	AZO	YPR; 11	EST	CZE	CYP	GRE	VAL	NC	0
2016	(United Kingdom) Euan Thorburn	Peugeot 208 T16	CAN	IRE; Ret	GRE	AZO	YPR	EST	POL	ZLI	LIE	CYP	NC	0
