= Arnold Clark =

Scottish businessman

Sir Arnold Clark
- Born: John Arnold Clark; 27 November 1927; Glasgow, Scotland
- Died: 10 April 2017 (aged 89); Glasgow, Scotland
- Occupation: Businessman
- Title: Founder, chairman and chief executive of Arnold Clark Automobiles
- Spouse: Lady Philomena Clark
- Children: 10

Sir John Arnold Clark (27 November 1927 – 10 April 2017) was a Scottish billionaire businessman. Clark opened a showroom in Glasgow in 1954 and found some success selling cars. He expanded his business and Arnold Clark Automobiles became a nationwide chain of motor dealerships and the largest privately owned business in Scotland.

Clark kept his business family owned for more than sixty years, remaining the chairman and chief executive. In 2016, he became the first billionaire car dealer in Britain.

== Early life ==
John Arnold Clark was born in a tenement in Townhead, Glasgow, on 27 November 1927. His father was a Clydeside shipworker. He attended Dennistoun Primary School and left home aged fourteen with no qualifications. During the war, he moved to the Isle of Arran.

He was conscripted to the Royal Air Force (RAF) towards the end of the Second World War aged seventeen, and worked as a Motor Mechanics Instructor. He reached the rank of Corporal and would later remark that during this period his self discipline developed; as did leadership qualities.

== Car salesman ==
Clark left the RAF in the early 1950s, but was unable to find employment. He used his demob money to purchase a 1933 Morris Ten-Four for £70, and after restoring it, sold it for a profit. Clark started buying and selling cars, opening his first showroom in 1954 in Glasgow's Park Road. He secured his first retail franchise for Morris Motors in 1959, then during the early 1960s established showrooms in Bothwell Street and also in Paisley and Bearsden.

He launched a finance company in 1963, meaning people no longer needed to involve their bank manager when purchasing vehicles from him. In the 1960s, Clark also expanded into the rental vehicle market. In 1968, took over Grant, Melrose and Tennant giving the company an accident repair centre. By the late 1980s, Arnold Clark had branches across Central Scotland and one in England.

By September 2002, Arnold Clark had 97 dealerships and with annual sales expected to reach £1 billion, it was considered Scotland's largest private company. In May 2006, the company acquired the Harry Fairbairn BMW and Mini dealership. The company opened a car showroom in the regenerated Glasgow Harbour, which at the time was Europe's largest. The following year Clark's company was approaching a £2 billion turnover.

At the age of 80, Clark was still a director of his company, receiving a salary of £1.3 million. He remained as chairman and chief executive, thus being the company's highest paid director and was receiving almost £2 million a year by 2012. In September 2014, the company’s turnover reached almost £3 billion.

By 2014, his wealth was estimated at £675 million, ahead of Britain's other car dealers. The Sunday Times Rich List 2016 estimated that the fortune amassed by Clark and his family to be more than £1 billion, making him Britain's first billionaire car dealer. He appeared on The World's Billionaires list compiled by Forbes for the first time in March 2017.

== Awards and honours ==
In the 2004 New Year Honours, Clark was created a Knight Bachelor, for services to the motor industry, and for his community work in Scotland. The University of Glasgow bestowed an honorary degree upon him in 2005. He was presented with Car Dealer Magazine's Lifetime Achievement Award in 2015.

== Personal life ==
Clark married twice, and had ten children — six sons and four daughters. Clark had four sons from his first marriage, although his son Norman died in 1995 in Helensburgh at the age of 33. His second marriage was to Philomena and they had six children together. Clark settled in the village of Killearn and was a church elder. He died on 10 April 2017, aged 89.

=== Car collection ===
Clark had an "extensive collection of classic cars", including a Ford Model T Town Car (1915), a Ford Model T Coupé (1924), a Citroën Cloverleaf (1926), a Rolls-Royce Park Ward Single Tourer 20 hp (1928), an Austin Heavy 12 (1929).

=== Yacht ===
Clark bought the Maxi yacht Drum from Simon Le Bon in 1988. The 78 foot craft is sailed with a crew of 22. That year, Clark led the annual Tobermory race, before Drum was involved in a collision with a Royal Navy submarine, around five miles off the Mull of Kintyre. He loaned it back to Le Bon in 2005 and the yacht was often loaned to other organisations to raise money for charitable work.
