= Ford Fiesta Rally2 =

Ford Rally2 rally car

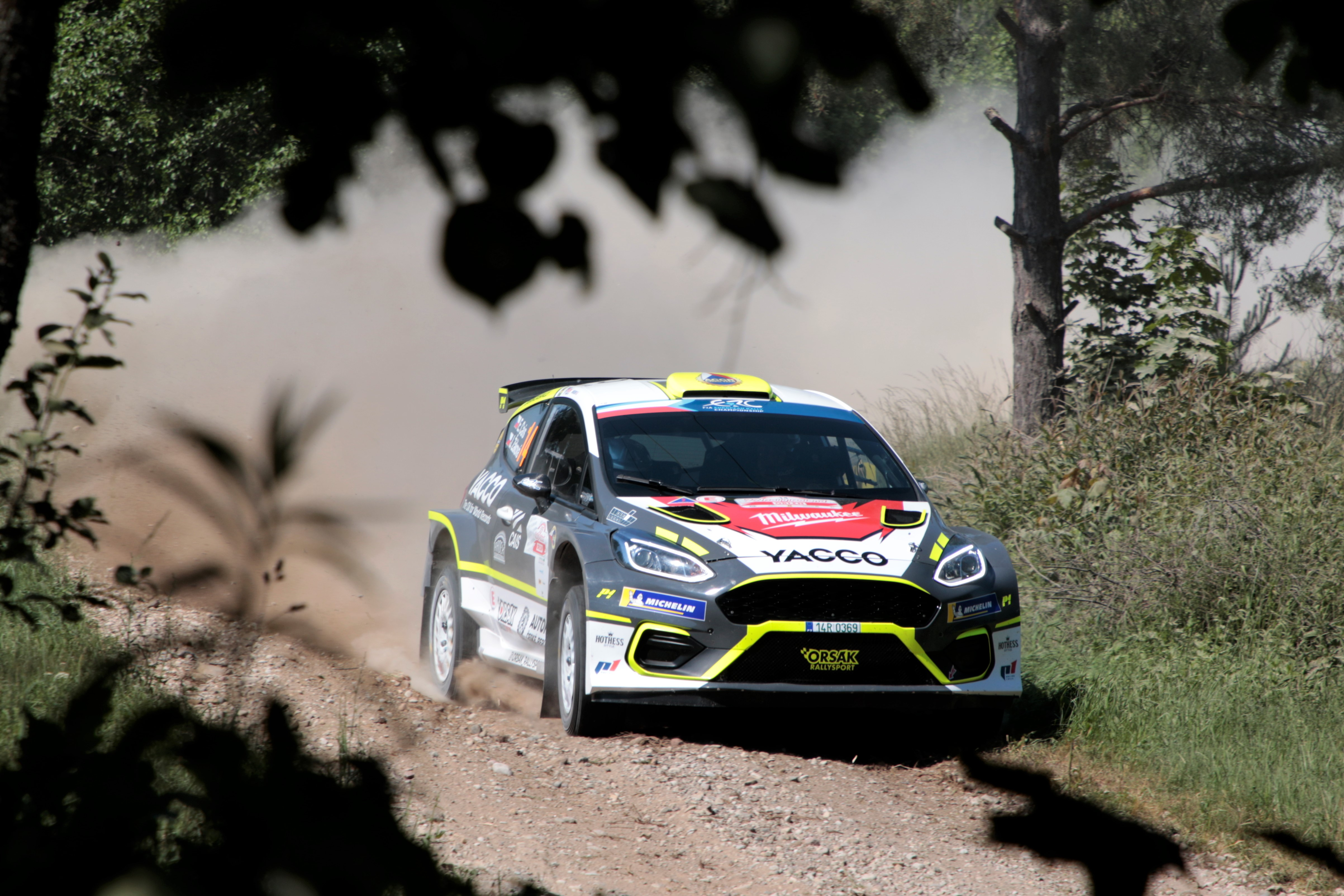
- A Fiesta Rally2 at the 2021 Rally Poland
- Category: Rally2
- Constructor: M-Sport
- Designer: Bernardo Fernandes
- Predecessor: Ford Fiesta R5

Technical specifications
- Length: 4,065 mm (4.1 m)
- Width: 1,820 mm (1.8 m)
- Engine: M-Sport developed 1,596 cubic centimetres (97.4 cu in; 1.596 L) Inline 4, 16-valve turbocharged
- Transmission: Sadev 5-speed sequential 4-wheel drive
- Power: 290 brake horsepower (220 kW; 290 PS); 470 newton-metres (350 lbf⋅ft)
- Weight: 1,210 kg (2,667.6 lb)

Competition history
- Notable entrants: M-Sport Ford WRT
- Notable drivers: (Estonia) Romet Jürgenson (Finland) Teemu Suninen (Finland) Jari Huttunen (France) Adrien Fourmaux (Sweden) Mille Johansson (Republic of Ireland) Eamonn Boland (Republic of Ireland) Jon Armstrong (United Kingdom) Gus Greensmith
- Debut: 2020

The Ford Fiesta Rally2 (formerly known as Ford Fiesta R5 Mk. II) is a rally car developed and built by M-Sport to comply with Group Rally2 regulations. It is based upon the Ford Fiesta road car and made its debut in 2020.

== Rally victories ==
=== World Rally Championship-2 Pro ===
Year	No.	Event	Surface	Driver	Co-driver
2019	1	2019 Rally Turkey	Gravel	(United Kingdom) Gus Greensmith	(United Kingdom) Elliott Edmondson

=== World Rally Championship-2 ===
Year	No.	Event	Surface	Driver	Co-driver
2021	1	(Italy) 2021 Rally Monza	Tarmac	(Finland) Jari Huttunen	(Finland) Mikko Lukka

=== European Rally Championship ===
Year	No.	Event	Surface	Driver	Co-driver
2020	1	(Spain) 2020 Rally Islas Canarias	Tarmac	(France) Adrien Fourmaux	(Belgium) Renaud Jamoul
2025	2	(United Kingdom) 2025 Rali Ceredigion	Tarmac	(Republic of Ireland) Jon Armstrong	(Republic of Ireland) Shane Byrne
2025	3	2025 Rally Croatia	Tarmac	(Republic of Ireland) Jon Armstrong	(Republic of Ireland) Shane Byrne

== Rally results ==
=== WRC-2 results ===
Year	Entrant	Driver	1	2	3	4	5	6	7	8	9	10	11	12	Teams	Points
2021	M-Sport Ford WRT	(France) Adrien Fourmaux	MON; 2	ARC; 9	CRO	POR	ITA; 6	KEN	EST; 4	BEL	GRE	FIN	ESP	MNZ	3rd	146
2021	M-Sport Ford WRT	(Czech Republic) Martin Prokop	MON	ARC; 6	CRO	POR; 7	ITA; 4	KEN; Ret	EST	BEL	GRE; 5	FIN; 4	ESP	MNZ	3rd	146
2021	M-Sport Ford WRT	(Finland) Teemu Suninen	MON	ARC	CRO; 2	POR; 2	ITA	KEN	EST	BEL; Ret	GRE	FIN	ESP	MNZ	3rd	146
2021	M-Sport Ford WRT	(Sweden) Tom Kristensson	MON	ARC	CRO; Ret	POR; 9	ITA	KEN	EST; 5	BEL; Ret	GRE	FIN; Ret	ESP	MNZ	3rd	146
2021	M-Sport Ford WRT	(Finland) Jari Huttunen	MON	ARC	CRO	POR	ITA	KEN	EST	BEL	GRE	FIN	ESP	MNZ; 1	3rd	146

* Season still in progress.
