= David Bogie =

British rally driver (born 1987)

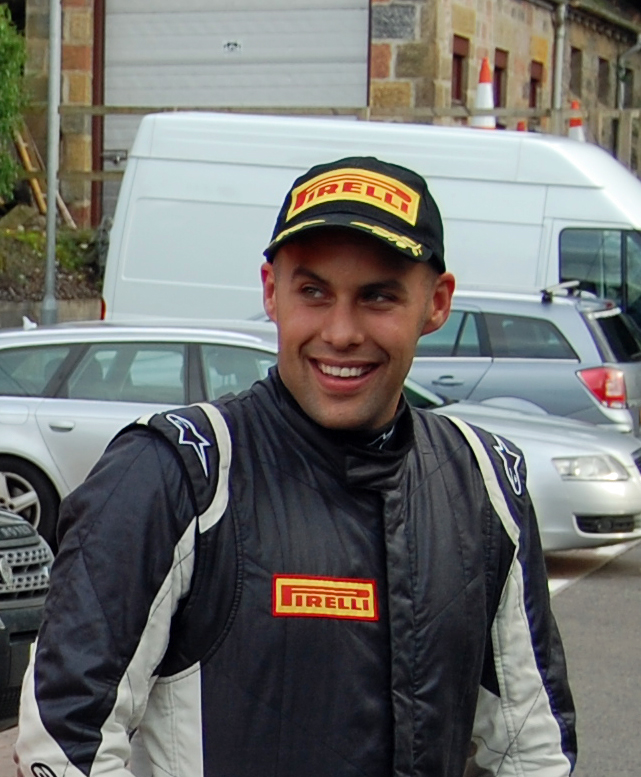
- Nationality: (Scotland) Scottish (United Kingdom) British
- Born: 31 July 1987 (age 39)

Scottish Rally Championship career
- Debut season: 2005
- Co-driver: Kevin Rae; John Rowan
- Starts: 84
- Wins: 35

Championship titles
- 2011 BRC 2009 SRC 2010 SRC 2011 SRC 2012 SRC 2013 SRC 2022 SRC: British Rally Champion; Scottish Rally Champion

David Bogie (born 31 July 1987) is a British rally driver from Dumfries. He has held the title of Scottish Rally Champion for a record breaking six years from 2009 until 2013 and 2022. At the end of season 2011, he was both Scottish and British Rally Champion, the first person to hold both titles simultaneously.

== Career ==
Bogie's first rally was in 2004 at the wheel of a Vauxhall Nova on a round of the SRC. He continued to use this car throughout 2005 and 2006 in the BTRDA Rally Championship in the 1400 section. In 2007, he had his first stage win, driving a Toyota Corolla WRC. That year, he came third in the SRC, a feat he repeated in 2008.

2009 saw Bogie mount a full season in the British Rally Championship where, despite two podium finishes, reliability problems with his Mitsubishi EVO X meant he had a disappointing season. Bogie and long term co-driver, Kevin Rae from Hawick, took the SRC crown in 2009, at age 22, becoming the youngest winner of the SRC since Colin McRae in 1988.

During the 2010 SRC season, Bogie drove his Mitsubishi Lancer Evo 9 (with a one-off outing in a Ford Focus WRC), where he took maximum points in six of the eight rounds of the championship.

August 2011 saw Bogie clinch the Scottish Rally Championship for the third successive year with two rounds remaining. Winning four of the six rounds so far, again in his Mitsubishi (with a one-off outing in his fathers Metro 6R4), he was uncatchable on points by this stage in the competition.

On 24 September 2011, Bogie finished third in the Yorkshire rally. This result ensured he had enough points to be crowned British Rally Champion for the first time. He became the first Scot to win both the Scottish and British Rally Championships in the same year.

In September 2012, following the Merrick Forest Stages Rally Bogie and his co-driver Kevin Rae were declared Scottish Rally Champions for the fourth year in succession.

SRC season 2013 saw Bogie retire his Mitsubishi EVO and take to the stages in an ex-Colin McRae Ford Focus WRC 02.

For 2016 and 2017, Bogie and Rae entered the British Rally Championship. They competed in a Škoda Fabia R5 run by Carlisle, Cumbria based CA1 Sport. A lack of consistency meant they could only manage seventh overall in 2016 and eighth in 2017.

=== Complete World Rally Championship results ===
Year	Entrant	Car	1	2	3	4	5	6	7	8	9	10	11	12	13	14	WDC	Pts
2014	Bosowa Rally Team	Škoda Fabia R5	MON	SWE	MEX	ARG	POR	ITA	POL	FIN	GER	AUS	FRA	ESP	GBR; Ret		NC	0
2015	David Bogie	Škoda Fabia R5	MON	SWE	MEX	ARG	POR	ITA	POL	FIN	GER	AUS	FRA	ESP	GBR; Ret		NC	0
2016	(Netherlands) Wevers Sport	Škoda Fabia R5	MON	SWE	MEX	FRA	ARG	POR	ITA	POL	FIN	GER	CHN; C	ESP	GBR; 23	AUS	NC	0
2017	(Poland) Wojciech Chuchala	Škoda Fabia R5	MON	SWE	MEX	FRA	ARG	POR	ITA	POL	FIN	GER	ESP	GBR; 14	AUS		NC	0

=== WRC 2 results ===
Year	Entrant	Car	1	2	3	4	5	6	7	8	9	10	11	12	13	14	Pos.	Points
2014	Bosowa Rally Team	Škoda Fabia R5	MON	SWE	MEX	POR	ARG	ITA	POL	FIN	GER	AUS	FRA	ESP	GBR; Ret		NC	0
2016	(Netherlands) Wevers Sport	Škoda Fabia R5	MON	SWE	MEX	FRA	ARG	POR	ITA	POL	FIN	GER	CHN; C	ESP	GBR; 9	AUS	39th	2
2017	(Poland) Wojciech Chuchala	Škoda Fabia R5	MON	SWE	MEX	FRA	ARG	POR	ITA	POL	FIN	GER	ESP	GBR; 4	AUS		25th	12

=== IRC results ===
Year	Entrant	Car	1	2	3	4	5	6	7	8	9	10	11	12	WDC	Points
2009	(United Kingdom) David Bogie	Mitsubishi Evo XI	MON	BRA	KEN	AZO	BEL	RUS	MAD	CZE	AST	ITA	SCO; Ret		NC	0
2010	(United Kingdom) David Bogie	Mitsubishi Evo XI	MON	BRA	ARG	CAN	ITA	BEL	AZO	MAD	CZE	ITA	SCO; 4	CYP	18th	5
2011	(United Kingdom) David Bogie	Mitsubishi Evo XI	MON	CAN	FRA	UKR	BEL	AZO	CZE	HUN	ITA	SCO; Ret	CYP		NC	0

=== ERC results ===
Year	Entrant	Car	1	2	3	4	5	6	7	8	9	10	Pos	Points
2016	(United Kingdom) CA1 Sport	Škoda Fabia R5	CAN	IRE; 6	GRE	AZO	YPR	EST	POL	ZLI	LIE	CYP	42nd	10
