= Scottish Rally =

RSAC Scottish Rally
- Logo of the RSAC Scottish Rally
- Status: Active
- Genre: Rallying
- Frequency: Annual
- Venue: Dumfries and Galloway
- Location: Scotland
- Country: United Kingdom
- Inaugurated: 1932, 94 years ago
- Most recent: 2021 Scottish Rally
- Website: http://www.scottishrally.co.uk/

The Royal Scottish Automobile Club (RSAC) Scottish Rally is the highlight of the Scottish Rally Championship and the longest-standing rally event in Scotland, having been first contested in 1932. The event takes place in May or June of every year and the organisation claims that the warm weather and unique forest stages draw competitors from around the world. The rally has previously hosted a round of the World Rally Championship, enjoying the status of being a round of the Rally Championship for Drivers in 1978, and it also spent 26 years on the calendar of the European Rally Championship but in recent years it has been limited to being a round of the Scottish Rally Championship.

== History ==
The first Scottish rally took place from 4 to 9 July 1932 on a route of approximately 1,200 miles (1,900 km) through Scotland and England and consisted of six days of competition with participants beginning the rally at one of six start points in Glasgow, Edinburgh, Aberdeen, London, Harrogate and Droitwich. The first day involved competitors travelling from their chosen starting point before all rendezvousing in Scotland later in the event and finally ending in Edinburgh. Unlike in modern rallies where the object is to complete the course in as short a time as possible, competitors were set an average speed that they were expected to maintain on each stage. Points were awarded for meeting this target, the condition of the car at the end of the stage, and even for the number of occupants of each vehicle. There were also tests of driver and vehicle such as accelerating and braking challenges and "kerb driving" (driving as close as possible to the kerb without touching it). There were even dances organised in the evenings to allow drivers to socialise.

There was no single overall winner of the rally but G.F. Dennison (driving a Riley) was crowned champion of the small car category, while the large car category was won by J.S. Couldrey in a Hudson. There were also control prizes awarded for the best performer from each of the six starting points.

It was not until 1961 that a driver was awarded the overall winner's title, John Melvin being the first driver to receive that honour. The event used to enjoy International status, however since 1988, as the World Rally Championship moved to include only one event per country, it has been reduced to a National event in favour of the RAC Rally in Wales. Over the years, the event has been based in towns and cities throughout Scotland including Glasgow, Perth, Inverness and Dunoon. However, since 1997 it has been centered in Dumfries in South West Scotland.

The Scottish Rally formed part of the European Rally Championship from 1970 until 1996, but arguably its biggest moment came in 1978 when it formed part of the Cup for Rally Drivers. There was no World Championship title for rally drivers at this point, but the title was the precursor to today's World Rally Championship drivers' champion.

Notable winners of the Scottish Rally include Roger Clark, Hannu Mikkola, Stig Blomqvist, Ari Vatanen, Tony Pond, Malcolm Wilson, Richard Burns and Colin McRae. The most successful drivers in the event's history are Roger Clark and David Bogie, who tied Clark's record of six wins in 2019.

== List of winners ==
A full list of rally winners from the first time a single overall winner was recognised in 1961 until the present day is shown in the table below, along with their co-drivers and the car being driven.

Year	Driver	Co-Driver	Car
2024	David Bogie	Kirsty Riddick	Volkswagen Polo GTI R5
2023	Jock Armstrong	Hannah McKillop	Subaru Impreza
2022	Michael Binnie	Claire Mole	Mitsubishi Lancer Evo IX
2021	David Bogie	John Rowan	Mini John Cooper Works WRC
2020	Rally cancelled – COVID-19 pandemic		
2019	David Bogie	John Rowan	Škoda Fabia R5
2018	David Bogie	Kevin Rae	Škoda Fabia R5
2017	Euan Thorburn	Paul Beaton	Ford Fiesta R5
2016	Elfyn Evans	Craig Perry	Ford Fiesta R5
2015	David Bogie	Kevin Rae	Ford Fiesta R5
2014	Daniel McKenna	Arthur Kierans	Citroën DS3 R3T
2013	Alastair Fisher	Gordon Noble	Citroën DS3 R3T
2012	David Bogie	Kevin Rae	Mitsubishi Lancer Evolution IX
2011	Jock Armstrong	Kirsty Riddick	Subaru Impreza
2010	David Bogie	Kevin Rae	Mitsubishi Lancer Evolution IX
2009	Mike Faulkner	Peter Foy	Mitsubishi Lancer Evo VI
2008	Dave Weston	Dave Robson	Ford Focus RS WRC
2007	Gary Adam	Gordon Adam	Subaru Impreza
2006	Dave Weston	Dave Robson	Ford Focus RS WRC
2005	Mark Higgins	Bryan Thomas	Ford Focus RS WRC
2004	Jonny Milner	Nicky Beech	Subaru Impreza WRC
2003	Jonny Milner	Nicky Beech	Toyota Corolla WRC
2002	Jonny Milner	Nicky Beech	Toyota Corolla WRC
2001	Dave Weston	Neil Shanks	Subaru Impreza WRC
2000	Tapio Laukkanen	Kaj Lindstrom	VW Golf
1999	Tapio Laukkanen	Kaj Lindstrom	Renault Maxi Mégane
1998	Alister McRae	David Senior	VW Golf GTi Kit Car
1997	Alister McRae	David Senior	VW Golf GTi Kit Car
1996	Harri Rovanperä	Juha Repo	Mitsubishi Lancer Evolution
1995	Tomas Abrahamsson	Mike Kidd	Ford Escort RS Cosworth
1994	Malcolm Wilson	Bryan Thomas	Ford Sierra RS Cosworth
1993	Richard Burns	Robert Reid	Subaru Legacy RS
1992	Colin McRae	Derek Ringer	Subaru Legacy RS
1991	Colin McRae	Derek Ringer	Subaru Legacy RS
1990	David Llewellin	Phil Short	Toyota Celica GT-Four ST165
1989	David Llewellin	Phil Short	Toyota Celica GT-Four ST165
1988	Jimmy McRae	Rob Arthur	Ford Sierra RS Cosworth
1987	David Llewellin	Phil Short	Audi Quattro
1986	Mikael Sundstrom	Voitto Silander	Peugeot 205 T16
1985	Malcolm Wilson	Nigel Harris	Audi Quattro A1
1984	Hannu Mikkola	Phil Short	Audi Quattro A2
1983	Stig Blomqvist	Bjorn Cederberg	Audi Quattro
1982	Hannu Mikkola	Arne Hertz	Audi Quattro
1981	Tony Pond	Mike Nicholson	Vauxhall Chevette
1980	Hannu Mikkola	Arne Hertz	Ford Escort RS1800
1979	Pentti Airikkala	Risto Virtanen	Vauxhall Chevette
1978	Hannu Mikkola	Arne Hertz	Ford Escort RS1800
1977	Ari Vatanen	Peter Bryant	Ford Escort RS1800
1976	Russell Brookes	John Brown	Ford Escort RS1800
1975	Roger Clark	Jim Porter	Ford Escort RS1600
1974	Rally cancelled – Tanker drivers' strike		
1973	Roger Clark	Jim Porter	Ford Escort RS1600
1972	Hannu Mikkola	Hamish Cardno	Ford Escort RS1600
1971	Chris Sclater	John Davenport	Ford Escort RS1600
1970	Brian Culcheth	Johnstone Syer	Triumph 2.5 Pi
1969	Simo Lampinen	Arne Hertz	Saab 96
1968	Roger Clark	Jim Porter	Ford Escort RS1600
1967	Roger Clark	Jim Porter	Ford Cortina GT
1966	Tony Fall	Mike Wood	Mini Cooper S
1965	Roger Clark	Jim Porter	Ford Cortina GT
1964	Roger Clark	Jim Porter	Ford Cortina GT
1963	Andrew Cowan	David Thomson	Sunbeam Rapier
1962	Andrew Cowan	David Thomson	Sunbeam Rapier
1961	John Melvin	Anne Melvin	Sunbeam Alpine
