= Jock Armstrong =

British rally driver from Castle Douglas

- Nationality: (Scotland) Scottish
- Born: 23 January 1970 (age 56)

Scottish Rally Championship career
- Debut season: 2003
- Co-driver: Kirsty Riddick, Paula Swinscoe, Cameron Fair
- Starts: 57
- Wins: 9

Championship titles
- 2015 SRC 2016 SRC: Scottish Rally Champion

John "Jock" Armstrong (born 23 January 1970) is a British rally driver from Castle Douglas. He was Scottish Rally Champion in 2015 and 2016.

== Career ==
Armstrong's first rally was in 1989 driving a Vauxhall Nova. In 1993, he won the UK Colway Tyres budget championship in a 1300cc Vauxhall Nova, ahead of drivers with more powerful cars.

In October 2015, Armstrong and regular co-driver Paula Swinscoe were crowned the 2015 Scottish Rally champions. During the Jim Clark Reivers rally in May, Armstrong and Swinscoe were given a 1-minute time penalty dropping them from first to third place, however following an appeal in late September this was overturned and the pair were granted the win. By the end of the season they had achieved two wins and three second places in their Subaru Impreza.

The SRC season 2016 saw Armstrong and Swinscoe repeat their feat and crowned Scottish Rally Champions for the second year in succession. After a close run season in 2017, they finished runners-up in the SRC title race.
