= Forest road =

Type of road for forestry

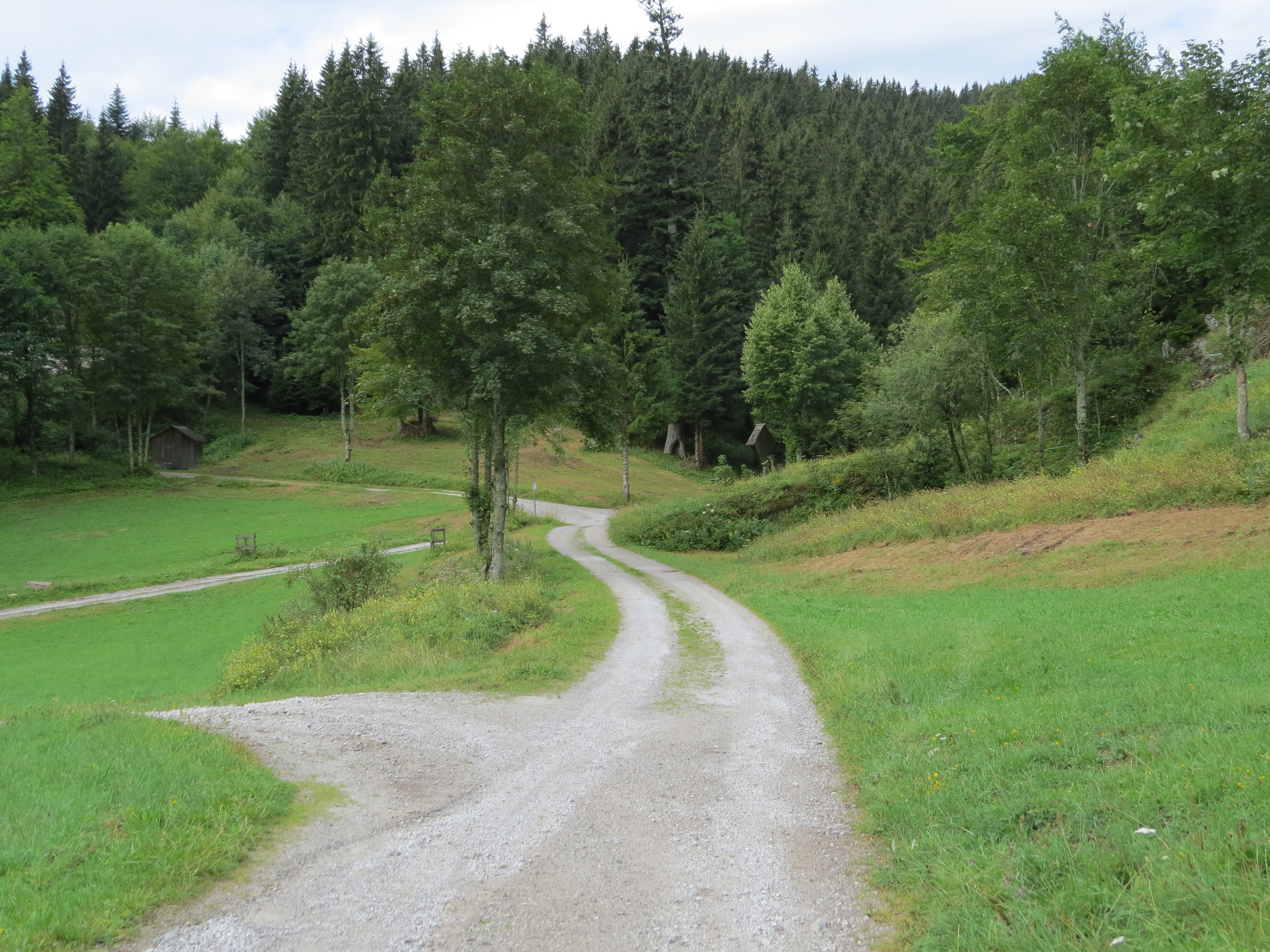
Forest road in Austria

Forest roads or forest tracks are roads or tracks intended to carry motorised vehicles or horse-drawn wagons being used mainly or exclusively for forestry purposes, such as conservation or logging. Forest tracks may be open to ramblers or mountain bikers depending on local rules.

== Description ==
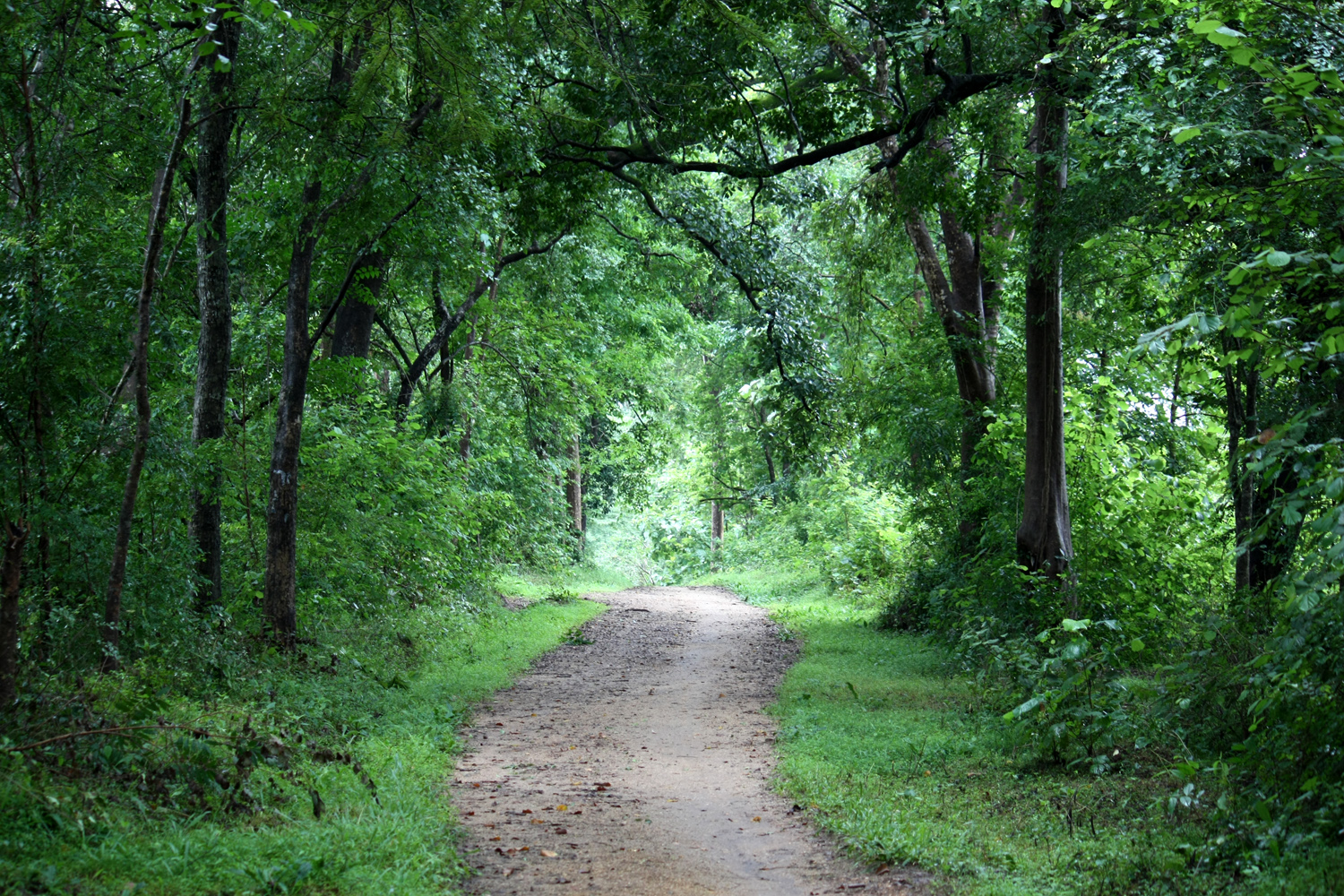
Forest road trail created naturally by walkers, Sri Lanka

Forest roads may be tarmacked, gravelled or metalled (using hard core) and often have restrictions on use. In many regions the establishment of forest roads is not only subject to approval under forest management law, but also conservation law.

In riparian forest and other especially important conservation areas, forest roads and tracks are generally closed, either with signs or barriers.

In mountainous regions the situation is more complex. On the one hand, forest roads on steep mountainsides must be wider than on the plains in order to enable vehicles to safely negotiate hairpin bends. On the other hand, the widening of old tracks runs the risk of heavier erosion or landslides.

== Classification ==
Forest roads may be subdivided into various classes according to their capacity. For example, in Germany, the key of topographic maps distinguishes between metalled roadways (Befestigte Fahrwege), roadways (Fahrwege), forest tracks (Waldwege) and footpaths (Fußwege), the latter not being suitable for forest vehicles.

== Design considerations ==
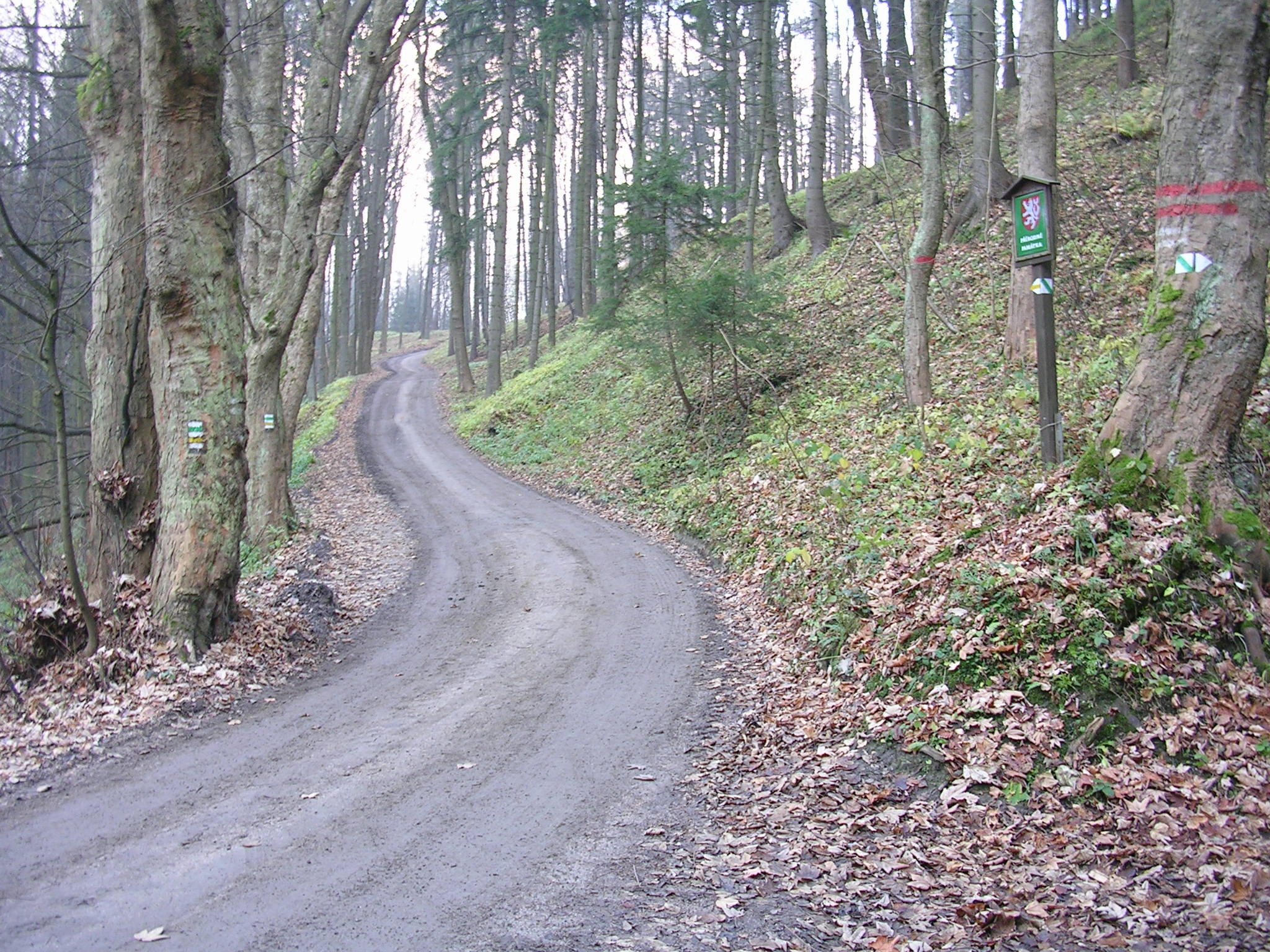
Forest road in North Bohemia

For logging roads, the choice of road design standards is a tradeoff between construction costs and haul costs (which the road is designed to reduce). A road that serves only a few stands will be used by relatively few trucks over its lifetime and so it makes sense to save construction costs with a narrow, winding, unpaved road that adds to the time (and haul costs) of the few trips. A main haul road serving a large area, however, will be used by many trucks each day, and each trip will be shorter (saving time and money) if the road is straighter and wider, with a smoother surface.

Recent large-scale research projects in Sweden have focused on improving the performance and resilience of forest roads under increasing traffic loads and changing climate conditions. One such project, investigated methods for enhancing the bearing capacity, durability, and sustainability of forest roads through the use of innovative design and construction techniques.

The project addressed challenges such as increased axle loads, moisture sensitivity, and freeze–thaw cycles, which significantly affect the performance of unpaved forest roads. A range of solutions were tested under real conditions, including geocell reinforcement, enzyme-based stabilization, improved drainage systems such as stone mattresses, optimized road geometry, and enhanced compaction techniques. Field measurements and pilot road sections demonstrated improved structural performance and longer service life of the roads.

== See also ==
- Agricultural road
