= 2002 British Rally Championship =

Seasons
- ← 2000 2003 →

The 2002 British Rally Championship season was the 44th season of the British Rally Championship. The season consisted of eight rounds and began on 26 April, with the Pirelli International Rally in the north east of England. The season ended on 27 October, at the Michelin South of England Tempest Stages. The series was organised by the Royal Scottish Automobile Club.

== Entry list ==
Constructor	Car	Driver	Co-Driver	Rds.
Ford	Ford Puma S1600	(United Kingdom) Stuart Darcy	(United Kingdom) Trevor Bustard	1
Ford	Ford Puma S1600	(United Kingdom) Stuart Darcy	(United Kingdom) Claire Mole	2-5
Ford	Ford Puma S1600	(United Kingdom) David Henderson	(United Kingdom) Scott Poxon	1-6
Ford	Ford Puma S1600	(United Kingdom) Kris Meeke	(United Kingdom) Glenn Patterson	All
Ford	Ford Puma S1600	(United Kingdom) Guy Wilks	(United Kingdom) Roger Herron	All
MG	MG ZR	(United Kingdom) Rob Gill	(United Kingdom) Anders Howard	1
MG	MG ZR	(United Kingdom) Rob Gill	(United Kingdom) Nick Taylor	4
MG	MG ZR S1600	(United Kingdom) Gwyndaf Evans	(United Kingdom) Chris Patterson	1-2, 4, 6-7
Mitsubishi	Mitsubishi Lancer Evo 6.5	(Japan) Katsuhiko Taguchi	(United Kingdom) Derek Ringer	2-4
Mitsubishi	Mitsubishi Lancer Evo VI	(Sweden) Oscar Svedlund	(Sweden) Björn Nilsson	1-3
Opel	Opel Corsa S1600	(Germany) Sven Haaf	(Germany) Michael Kölbach	7
Peugeot	Peugeot 106 Maxi	(United Kingdom) Martin Sansom	(United Kingdom) Phil Wells	1-3
Peugeot	Peugeot 106 Maxi	(United Kingdom) Martin Sansom	(United Kingdom) Ieuan Thomas	4-6
Peugeot	Peugeot 206 S1600	(United Kingdom) Justin Dale	(United Kingdom) Andrew Bargery	All
Peugeot	Peugeot 206 S1600	(Republic of Ireland) Rory Galligan	(United Kingdom) Gordon Noble	All
Peugeot	Peugeot 206 XS	(United Kingdom) Garry Jennings	(Republic of Ireland) Paul Nagle	4, 6
Peugeot	Peugeot 206	(Greece) Yorgo Philippedes	(United Kingdom) Marshall Clarke	4
Peugeot	Peugeot 206	(Greece) Yorgo Philippedes	(United Kingdom) Mike Smith	6
Renault	Renault Clio RS	(Italy) Marco Veroni	(Italy) Lorenzo Granai	1-5
Renault	Renault Clio	(Italy) Marco Veroni	(Italy) Bernardo Serra	7
Subaru	Subaru Impreza S4 WRC '98	(Sweden) Johan Kressner	(Norway) Cato Menkerud	1
Subaru	Subaru Impreza S4 WRC '98	(Sweden) Johan Kressner	(Sweden) Leif Wigert	2
Subaru	Subaru Impreza S6 WRC '00	(Republic of Ireland) Daniel Doherty	(Republic of Ireland) Michael Doherty	6
Subaru	Subaru Impreza S6 WRC '00	(United Kingdom) Andrew Nesbitt	(Republic of Ireland) James O'Brien	4-6
Subaru	Subaru Impreza STi	(Finland) Tapio Laukkanen	(Finland) Ilkka Riipinen	1
Subaru	Subaru Impreza WRX STi	(Finland) Tapio Laukkanen	(Finland) Ilkka Riipinen	2-3
Subaru	Subaru Impreza 555	(United Kingdom) Charlie Jukes	(United Kingdom) David Williams	2, 4
Toyota	Toyota Corolla WRC			
Toyota	Toyota Corolla WRC	(United Kingdom) Mark Higgins	(United Kingdom) Michael Gibson	3
Toyota	Toyota Corolla WRC	(United Kingdom) Mark Higgins	(United Kingdom) Craig Thorley	5
Toyota	Toyota Corolla WRC	(Republic of Ireland) Austin MacHale	(Republic of Ireland) Brian Murphy	1-4
Toyota	Toyota Corolla WRC	(United Kingdom) Jonny Milner	(United Kingdom) Nicky Beech	All

== Calendar ==
- Pirelli International Rally - 26–28 April
- Rally of Wales - 18–19 May
- RSAC Scottish Rally - 7–9 June
- Jim Clark Memorial Rally - 12–13 June
- Manx International Rally - 1–3 August
- The Ulster Rally - 6–7 September
- Trackrod Rally Yorkshire - 28–29 September
- Michelin South of England Tempest Stages - 26–27 October
