= 2000 Rally Finland =

Motor rally competition

2000 Rally Finland 50th Neste Rally Finland
Round 9 of the 2000 World Rally Championship season
← Previous event	Next event →
- Host country: Finland
- Rally base: Jyväskylä
- Dates run: August 18 2000 – August 20 2000
- Stages: 23 (410.18 km; 254.87 miles)
- Stage surface: Gravel
- Overall distance: 1,680.14 km (1,043.99 miles)

Statistics
- Crews: 122 at start, 55 at finish

Overall results
- Overall winner: (Finland) Marcus Grönholm (Finland) Timo Rautiainen (France) Peugeot Esso; Peugeot 206 WRC

The 2000 Rally Finland (formally the 50th Neste Rally Finland) was the ninth round of the 2000 World Rally Championship. The race was held over three days between 18 August and 20 August 2000, and was won by Peugeot's Marcus Grönholm, his 3rd win in the World Rally Championship.

== Background ==
=== Entry list ===
No.	Driver	Co-Driver	Entrant	Car	Tyre
World Rally Championship manufacturer entries
1	(Finland) Tommi Mäkinen	(Finland) Risto Mannisenmäki	(Japan) Marlboro Mitsubishi Ralliart	Mitsubishi Lancer Evo VI	MI
2	(Belgium) Freddy Loix	(Belgium) Sven Smeets	(Japan) Marlboro Mitsubishi Ralliart	Mitsubishi Carisma GT Evo VI	MI
3	(United Kingdom) Richard Burns	(United Kingdom) Robert Reid	(Japan) Subaru World Rally Team	Subaru Impreza S6 WRC '00	P
4	(Finland) Juha Kankkunen	(Finland) Juha Repo	(Japan) Subaru World Rally Team	Subaru Impreza S6 WRC '00	P
5	(United Kingdom) Colin McRae	(United Kingdom) Nicky Grist	(United Kingdom) Ford Motor Co. Ltd.	Ford Focus RS WRC '00	MI
6	(Spain) Carlos Sainz	(Spain) Luis Moya	(United Kingdom) Ford Motor Co. Ltd.	Ford Focus RS WRC '00	MI
7	(France) Didier Auriol	(France) Denis Giraudet	(Spain) SEAT Sport	SEAT Córdoba WRC Evo3	P
8	(Finland) Toni Gardemeister	(Finland) Paavo Lukander	(Spain) SEAT Sport	SEAT Córdoba WRC Evo3	P
9	(Finland) Sebastian Lindholm	(Finland) Jukka Aho	(France) Peugeot Esso	Peugeot 206 WRC	MI
10	(Finland) Marcus Grönholm	(Finland) Timo Rautiainen	(France) Peugeot Esso	Peugeot 206 WRC	MI
14	(Sweden) Kenneth Eriksson	(Sweden) Staffan Parmander	(South Korea) Hyundai Castrol World Rally Team	Hyundai Accent WRC	MI
15	(United Kingdom) Alister McRae	(United Kingdom) David Senior	(South Korea) Hyundai Castrol World Rally Team	Hyundai Accent WRC	MI
World Rally Championship entries
16	(Norway) Petter Solberg	(United Kingdom) Phil Mills	(United Kingdom) Ford Motor Co. Ltd.	Ford Focus RS WRC '00	MI
17	(Finland) Harri Rovanperä	(Finland) Risto Pietiläinen	(Finland) Harri Rovanperä	Toyota Corolla WRC	—N/a
18	(France) François Delecour	(France) Daniel Grataloup	(France) Peugeot Esso	Peugeot 206 WRC	MI
19	(Finland) Tapio Laukkanen	(Finland) Kaj Lindström	(Finland) Tapio Laukkanen	Ford Focus RS WRC '00	MI
20	(Estonia) Markko Märtin	(United Kingdom) Michael Park	(Estonia) Lukoil EOS Rally Team	Toyota Corolla WRC	—N/a
21	(Finland) Pasi Hagström	(Finland) Tero Gardemeister	(Finland) Pasi Hagström	Toyota Corolla WRC	—N/a
22	(Finland) Janne Tuohino	(Finland) Miikka Anttila	(Finland) Janne Tuohino	Toyota Corolla WRC	—N/a
24	(Saudi Arabia) Abdullah Bakhashab	(United Kingdom) Bobby Willis	Toyota Team Saudi Arabia	Toyota Corolla WRC	MI
30	(Austria) Raphael Sperrer	(Sweden) Per Carlsson	(Austria) Raphael Sperrer	Seat Cordoba WRC Evo2	—N/a
31	(Norway) Henning Solberg	(Norway) Runar Pedersen	(Norway) Henning Solberg	Toyota Corolla WRC	—N/a
34	(Australia) Michael Guest	(Australia) David Green	(South Korea) Hyundai World Rally Team	Hyundai Accent WRC	MI
38	(France) Frédéric Dor	(France) Didier Breton	(France) F. Dor Rally Team	Subaru Impreza S5 WRC '99	—N/a
46	(Finland) Saku Vierimaa	(Finland) Hasse Kalstrom	(Finland) Saku Vierimaa	Ford Escort RS Cosworth	—N/a
48	(Finland) Jussi Välimäki	(Finland) Jarkko Kalliolepo	(Finland) Jussi Välimäki	Ford Escort WRC	—N/a
49	(Poland) Tomasz Kuchar	(Poland) Maciej Szczepaniak	(Poland) Tomasz Kuchar	Toyota Corolla WRC	MI
56	(Finland) Jari Viita	(Finland) Riku Rousku	(Finland) Jari Viita	Ford Escort WRC	—N/a
58	(Finland) Jouko Tiri	(Finland) Ari Haipus	(Finland) Jouko Tiri	Subaru Impreza 555	—N/a
59	(Estonia) Aleksander Käo	(Estonia) Aare Ojamäe	(Estonia) Aleksander Käo	Mitsubishi Lancer Evo IV	—N/a
65	(Finland) Juha Pylvänäinen	(Finland) Kari Ali-Rantala	(Finland) Juha Pylvänäinen	Mitsubishi Lancer Evo VI	—N/a
72	(Finland) Jaakko Keskinen	(Finland) Juha Heikkilä	(Finland) Jaakko Keskinen	Mitsubishi Lancer Evo VI	—N/a
75	(Finland) Kari Tasanko	(Finland) Jouni Mustonen	(Finland) Kari Tasanko	Mitsubishi Lancer Evo VI	—N/a
80	(Finland) Seppo Muhonen	(Finland) Jouko Vaskelainen	(Finland) Seppo Muhonen	Mitsubishi Lancer Evo IV	—N/a
88	(Russia) Alexey Podgorniy	(Russia) Oleg Krylov	(Russia) Alexey Podgorniy	Ford Escort RS Cosworth	—N/a
100	(Italy) Fabrizio De Sanctis	(Italy) Manuela Bellis	(Italy) Fabrizio De Sanctis	Mitsubishi Lancer Evo VI	—N/a
124	(Italy) Italo Ferrara	(Italy) Gabriele Bobbio	(Italy) Italo Ferrara	Lancia Delta HF Integrale	—N/a
Group N Cup entries
25	(Finland) Jouko Puhakka	(Finland) Tomi Tuominen	(Finland) Tri-Racing Team	Mitsubishi Lancer Evo VI	—N/a
26	(Austria) Manfred Stohl	(Austria) Peter Müller	(Austria) Manfred Stohl	Mitsubishi Lancer Evo VI	—N/a
27	(Finland) Juuso Pykälistö	(Finland) Esko Mertsalmi	Mitsubishi Ralliart Finland	Mitsubishi Carisma GT Evo VI	—N/a
28	(Finland) Jani Paasonen	(Finland) Jakke Honkanen	Mitsubishi Ralliart Finland	Mitsubishi Carisma GT Evo VI	—N/a
29	(Uruguay) Gustavo Trelles	(Argentina) Jorge Del Buono	(Uruguay) Gustavo Trelles	Mitsubishi Lancer Evo VI	—N/a
32	(Finland) Marko Ipatti	(Finland) Jorma Körkkö	(Finland) Marko Ipatti	Subaru Impreza	—N/a
35	(Sweden) Kenneth Bäcklund	(Sweden) Tord Andersson	(Sweden) Kenneth Bäcklund	Mitsubishi Lancer Evo VI	—N/a
36	(Oman) Hamed Al-Wahaibi	(New Zealand) Tony Sircombe	(Oman) Arab World Rally Team	Subaru Impreza WRX STI RA	—N/a
37	(Italy) Gianluigi Galli	(Italy) Flavio Zanella	(Italy) Vieffe Corse SRL	Mitsubishi Lancer Evo V	—N/a
40	(Argentina) Claudio Marcelo Menzi	(Argentina) Edgardo Galindo	(Argentina) Claudio Marcelo Menzi	Mitsubishi Lancer Evo VI	—N/a
41	(Spain) Jesús Puras	(Spain) Marc Martí	(Spain) Jesús Puras	Mitsubishi Lancer Evo VI	MI
42	(Finland) Jouni Ampuja	(Finland) Jarmo Lehtinen	(Finland) Jouni Ampuja	Mitsubishi Carisma GT Evo VI	—N/a
43	(Argentina) Gabriel Pozzo	(Argentina) Fabian Cretu	(Argentina) Gabriel Pozzo	Mitsubishi Lancer Evo VI	—N/a
44	(Sweden) Pernilla Walfridsson	(Sweden) Ulrika Mattsson	(Sweden) Pernilla Walfridsson	Mitsubishi Lancer Evo VI	—N/a
47	(Finland) Juha Hellman	(Finland) Jani Laaksonen	(Finland) Juha Hellman	Mitsubishi Carisma GT Evo VI	—N/a
50	(United Kingdom) David Higgins	(United Kingdom) Shaun O'Gorman	(United Kingdom) David Higgins	Subaru Impreza WRX	—N/a
51	(Finland) Kaj Kuistila	(Finland) Kai Rantanen	(Finland) Kaj Kuistila	Mitsubishi Lancer Evo VI	—N/a
52	(Finland) Juha Salo	(Finland) Petri Keto	(Finland) Juha Salo	Mitsubishi Lancer Evo III	—N/a
53	(Finland) Jari Ketomaa	(Finland) Petri Lantta	(Finland) Jari Ketomaa	Subaru Impreza 555	—N/a
54	(Finland) Hannu Jokinen	(Finland) Mika Peltonen	(Finland) Hannu Jokinen	Mitsubishi Lancer Evo II	—N/a
55	(Finland) Hannu Hotanen	(Finland) Jari Jyrkiäinen	(Finland) Hannu Hotanen	Mitsubishi Lancer Evo VI	—N/a
57	(Finland) Kristian Sohlberg	(Finland) Jussi Aariainen	(Finland) Kristian Sohlberg	Mitsubishi Carisma GT	—N/a
61	(Finland) Teppo Vekka	(Finland) Ismo Rajamäki	(Finland) Teppo Vekka	Mitsubishi Lancer Evo V	—N/a
62	(Estonia) Margus Murakas	(Estonia) Peep Kallaste	(Estonia) Margus Murakas	Subaru Impreza WRX	—N/a
63	(Spain) Ignacio Sanfilippo	(Spain) José Vicente Medina	(Spain) Ignacio Sanfilippo	Mitsubishi Carisma GT Evo VI	—N/a
64	(Estonia) Toomas Nurmsalu	(Estonia) Jüri Kulli	(Estonia) Toomas Nurmsalu	Mitsubishi Lancer Evo IV	—N/a
66	(Finland) Janne Perälä	(Finland) Jouni Lampinen	(Finland) Janne Perälä	Mitsubishi Lancer Evo VI	—N/a
67	(Finland) Jyri Poltto	(Finland) Aki Suutarinen	(Finland) Jyri Poltto	Mitsubishi Lancer Evo II	—N/a
68	(Finland) Ari Laivola	(Finland) Markku Laakso	(Finland) Ari Laivola	Mitsubishi Lancer Evo VI	—N/a
69	(Finland) Mika Rantanen	(Finland) Jarno Tila	(Finland) Mika Rantanen	Mitsubishi Lancer Evo II	—N/a
71	(Finland) Jukka Aho	(Finland) Harri Kiesi	(Finland) Jukka Aho	Mitsubishi Lancer Evo IV	—N/a
73	(Finland) Minna Lindroos	(Finland) Sari Kontro-Silvennoinen	(Finland) Minna Lindroos	Mitsubishi Lancer Evo V	—N/a
76	(Finland) Antti Asunta	(Finland) Ilkka Riipinen	(Finland) Antti Asunta	Mitsubishi Carisma GT Evo VI	—N/a
78	(Norway) Stian Engh	(Norway) Henning Isdal	(Norway) Stian Engh	Mitsubishi Lancer Evo VI	—N/a
83	(Finland) Karri Marttila	(Finland) Janne Runtti	(Finland) Karri Marttila	Mitsubishi Carisma GT	—N/a
85	(Finland) Kim Jääskeläinen	(Finland) Aulis Ahonen	(Finland) Kim Jääskeläinen	Mitsubishi Carisma GT	—N/a
86	(Japan) Masayuki Akaba	(Japan) Takako Akaba	(Japan) Masayuki Akaba	Mitsubishi Lancer Evo V	—N/a
89	(Russia) Andrey Zhigunov	(Russia) Igor Ter-Oganesiants	(Russia) Andrey Zhigunov	Mitsubishi Lancer Evo IV	—N/a
90	(Japan) Masayuki Yamada	(Japan) Shunichi Washio	(Japan) Masayuki Yamada	Subaru Impreza	—N/a
91	(United Kingdom) Mark l'Anson	(United Kingdom) Graeme Walker	(United Kingdom) Mark l'Anson	Mitsubishi Lancer Evo V	—N/a
92	(Italy) Marco Menegatto	(Italy) Roberto Vittori	(Italy) Marco Menegatto	Mitsubishi Lancer Evo VI	—N/a
94	(Russia) Stanislav Gryazin	(Russia) Dmitriy Eremeev	(Russia) Stanislav Gryazin	Mitsubishi Lancer Evo VI	—N/a
95	(Finland) Eero Räikkönen	(Finland) Aki Hietala	(Finland) Eero Räikkönen	Honda Integra Type-R	—N/a
96	(Finland) Aki Keinänen	(Finland) Asko Sairanen	(Finland) Aki Keinänen	Honda Integra Type-R	—N/a
97	(Finland) Jani Ylipahkala	(Finland) Markku Laurila	(Finland) Jani Ylipahkala	Opel Astra GSi 16V	—N/a
98	(Finland) Pekka Turunen	(Finland) Sami Räsänen	(Finland) Pekka Turunen	Seat Ibiza GTi 16V	—N/a
99	(Finland) Ilkka Kärpänen	(Finland) Jaakko Jäntti	(Finland) Ilkka Kärpänen	Opel Astra GSi 16V	—N/a
103	(Finland) Ville-Pertti Teuronen	(Finland) Mikko Jokinen	(Finland) Ville-Pertti Teuronen	Peugeot 306 S16	—N/a
105	(Italy) Pierluigi Alessandri	(Italy) Christina Castiglioni	(Italy) Pierluigi Alessandri	Mitsubishi Lancer Evo V	—N/a
107	(Finland) Erno Randelin	(Finland) Juha-Pekka Kauppinen	(Finland) Erno Randelin	Opel Astra GSi 16V	—N/a
108	(Finland) Petri Norojärvi	(Finland) Eero Haarjarvi	(Finland) Petri Norojärvi	Opel Astra GSi 16V	—N/a
109	(Finland) Harri Korkiakoski	(Finland) Jorma Kiimalainen	(Finland) Harri Korkiakoski	Opel Astra GSi 16V	—N/a
110	(United Kingdom) Natalie Barratt	(United Kingdom) Joanne Lockwood	(United Kingdom) Natalie Barratt	Mitsubishi Lancer Evo VI	—N/a
112	(Finland) Henri Nyström	(Finland) Kalevi Lonka	(Finland) Henri Nyström	Ford Escort RS 2000	—N/a
118	(United Kingdom) Oliver Clark	(Venezuela) Ana Goñi	(United Kingdom) Oliver Clark	Mitsubishi Lancer Evo IV	—N/a
119	(Germany) Andreas Mansfeld	(Germany) Klaus Hartmann	(Germany) Andreas Mansfeld	Honda Integra Type-R DC2	—N/a
121	(France) Michel Molinié	(France) Vincent Aubry	(France) Michel Molinié	Mazda 323 GT-R	—N/a
122	(Finland) Petri Uronen	(Finland) Jani Salomaa	(Finland) Petri Uronen	Honda Integra Type-R	—N/a
123	(Finland) Kyosti Laihanen	(Finland) Markku Pylkko	(Finland) Kyosti Laihanen	Opel Astra GSi 16V	—N/a
125	(Republic of Ireland) Rory Galligan	(United Kingdom) Herbie Blackburn	(Republic of Ireland) Rory Galligan	Opel Astra GSi 16V	—N/a
126	(France) Jean-Louis Chanet	(France) Pascal Jacoulot	(France) Jean-Louis Chanet	Renault Clio Williams	—N/a
127	(Finland) Markku Harju	(Finland) Pekka Leppälä	(Finland) Markku Harju	Ford Escort RS 2000	—N/a
128	(Finland) Lasse Laine	(Finland) Jouni Laine	(Finland) Lasse Laine	Suzuki Swift GTi	—N/a
129	(Finland) Juha-Pekka Järvinen	(Finland) Jyrki Kumpulainen	(Finland) Juha-Pekka Järvinen	Volkswagen Polo 16V	—N/a
130	(Italy) Corrado Fontana	(Italy) Rodolfo Messa	(Italy) Corrado Fontana	Peugeot 306 Rallye	—N/a
131	(Finland) Juhani Länsikorpi	(Sweden) Markku Kangas	(Finland) Juhani Länsikorpi	Volkswagen Polo 16V	—N/a
132	(Finland) Matti J. Tarvainen	(Finland) Egil Eriksson	(Finland) Matti J. Tarvainen	Škoda Favorit 136 L	—N/a
134	(Germany) Holger Knöbel	(Germany) Manfred Klemme	(Germany) Holger Knöbel	Volkswagen Polo 16V	—N/a

=== Itinerary ===
All dates and times are EEST (UTC+3)

Date	Time	No.	Stage name	Distance
Leg 1 — 128.10 km
18 August	10:31	SS1	Kuohu	7.67 km
18 August	10:59	SS2	Parkkola	20.11 km
18 August	11:59	SS3	Mökkiperä	13.39 km
18 August	13:57	SS4	Muittari	13.51 km
18 August	14:20	SS5	Konttimäki	13.08 km
18 August	14:53	SS6	Palsankylä	13.90 km
18 August	16:21	SS7	Valkola	8.40 km
18 August	17:04	SS8	Lankamaa	23.44 km
18 August	17:57	SS9	Laukaa	12.37 km
18 August	20:29	SS10	Killeri 1	2.23 km
Leg 2 — 165.11 km
19 August	07:57	SS11	Juupajoki	30.34 km
19 August	09:15	SS12	Västilä	17.43 km
19 August	09:50	SS13	Päijälä	12.81 km
19 August	11:56	SS14	Ehikki 1	19.08 km
19 August	12:59	SS15	Leustu 1	23.58 km
19 August	15:16	SS16	Ouninpohja 1	34.21 km
19 August	16:19	SS17	Vaheri 1	25.43 km
19 August	20:00	SS18	Killeri 2	2.23 km
Leg 3 — 116.97 km
20 August	08:29	SS19	Ehikki 2	19.08 km
20 August	09:02	SS20	Moksi	14.67 km
20 August	09:41	SS21	Leustu 2	23.58 km
20 August	11:58	SS22	Ouninpohja 2	34.21 km
20 August	13:01	SS23	Vaheri 2	25.43 km

== Results ==
=== Overall ===
Pos.	No.	Driver	Co-driver	Team	Car	Time	Difference	Points
1	10	(Finland) Marcus Grönholm	(Finland) Timo Rautiainen	(France) Peugeot Esso	Peugeot 206 WRC	3:22:37.1		10
2	5	(United Kingdom) Colin McRae	(United Kingdom) Nicky Grist	(United Kingdom) Ford Motor Co. Ltd.	Ford Focus RS WRC '00	3:23:43.5	+1:06.4	6
3	17	(Finland) Harri Rovanperä	(Finland) Risto Pietiläinen	(Finland) Harri Rovanperä	Toyota Corolla WRC	3:23:46.7	+1:09.6	4
4	1	(Finland) Tommi Mäkinen	(Finland) Risto Mannisenmäki	(Japan) Marlboro Mitsubishi Ralliart	Mitsubishi Lancer Evo VI	3:24:15.8	+1:38.7	3
5	9	(Finland) Sebastian Lindholm	(Finland) Jukka Aho	(France) Peugeot Esso	Peugeot 206 WRC	3:25:43.1	+3:06.0	2
6	18	(France) François Delecour	(France) Daniel Grataloup	(France) Peugeot Esso	Peugeot 206 WRC	3:27:42.1	+5:05.0	1

=== World Rally Cars ===
==== Classification ====
Position		No.	Driver	Co-driver	Entrant	Car	Time	Difference	Points
Event	Class	No.	Driver	Co-driver	Entrant	Car	Time	Difference	Points
1	1	10	(Finland) Marcus Grönholm	(Finland) Timo Rautiainen	(France) Peugeot Esso	Peugeot 206 WRC	3:22:37.1		10
2	2	5	(United Kingdom) Colin McRae	(United Kingdom) Nicky Grist	(United Kingdom) Ford Motor Co. Ltd.	Ford Focus RS WRC '00	3:23:43.5	+1:06.4	6
4	3	1	(Finland) Tommi Mäkinen	(Finland) Risto Mannisenmäki	(Japan) Marlboro Mitsubishi Ralliart	Mitsubishi Lancer Evo VI	3:24:15.8	+1:38.7	3
5	4	9	(Finland) Sebastian Lindholm	(Finland) Jukka Aho	(France) Peugeot Esso	Peugeot 206 WRC	3:25:43.1	+3:06.0	2
8	5	4	(Finland) Juha Kankkunen	(Finland) Juha Repo	(Japan) Subaru World Rally Team	Subaru Impreza S6 WRC '00	3:28:30.0	+5:52.9	0
9	6	15	(United Kingdom) Alister McRae	(United Kingdom) David Senior	(South Korea) Hyundai Castrol World Rally Team	Hyundai Accent WRC	3:28:46.2	+6:09.1	0
11	7	7	(France) Didier Auriol	(France) Denis Giraudet	(Spain) SEAT Sport	SEAT Córdoba WRC Evo3	3:31:03.4	+8:26.3	0
14	8	6	(Spain) Carlos Sainz	(Spain) Luis Moya	(United Kingdom) Ford Motor Co. Ltd.	Ford Focus RS WRC '00	3:36:23.4	+13:46.3	0
15	9	14	(Sweden) Kenneth Eriksson	(Sweden) Staffan Parmander	(South Korea) Hyundai Castrol World Rally Team	Hyundai Accent WRC	3:36:28.1	+13:51.0	0
Retired SS12		3	(United Kingdom) Richard Burns	(United Kingdom) Robert Reid	(Japan) Subaru World Rally Team	Subaru Impreza S6 WRC '00	Accident		0
Retired SS11		2	(Belgium) Freddy Loix	(Belgium) Sven Smeets	(Japan) Marlboro Mitsubishi Ralliart	Mitsubishi Carisma GT Evo VI	Mechanical		0
Retired SS11		8	(Finland) Toni Gardemeister	(Finland) Paavo Lukander	(Spain) SEAT Sport	SEAT Córdoba WRC Evo3	Mechanical		0

==== Special stages ====
Day	Stage	Stage name	Length	Winner	Car	Time	Class leaders
Leg 1 (18 Aug)	SS1	Kuohu	7.67 km	(Finland) Marcus Grönholm	Peugeot 206 WRC	3:44.8	(Finland) Marcus Grönholm
Leg 1 (18 Aug)	SS2	Parkkola	20.11 km	(Finland) Marcus Grönholm	Peugeot 206 WRC	10:06.7	(Finland) Marcus Grönholm
Leg 1 (18 Aug)	SS3	Mökkiperä	13.39 km	(Finland) Marcus Grönholm	Peugeot 206 WRC	6:32.2	(Finland) Marcus Grönholm
Leg 1 (18 Aug)	SS4	Muittari	13.51 km	(Finland) Marcus Grönholm	Peugeot 206 WRC	6:05.6	(Finland) Marcus Grönholm
Leg 1 (18 Aug)	SS5	Konttimäki	13.08 km	(Finland) Marcus Grönholm	Peugeot 206 WRC	5:40.7	(Finland) Marcus Grönholm
Leg 1 (18 Aug)	SS6	Palsankylä	13.90 km	(United Kingdom) Richard Burns	Subaru Impreza S6 WRC '00	7:28.6	(Finland) Marcus Grönholm
Leg 1 (18 Aug)	SS7	Valkola	8.40 km	(United Kingdom) Richard Burns	Subaru Impreza S6 WRC '00	4:30.2	(Finland) Marcus Grönholm
Leg 1 (18 Aug)	SS8	Lankamaa	23.44 km	(Finland) Marcus Grönholm	Peugeot 206 WRC	11:47.3	(Finland) Marcus Grönholm
Leg 1 (18 Aug)	SS9	Laukaa	12.37 km	(United Kingdom) Richard Burns	Subaru Impreza S6 WRC '00	6:13.0	(Finland) Marcus Grönholm
Leg 1 (18 Aug)	SS10	Killeri 1	2.23 km	(Finland) Tommi Mäkinen (United Kingdom) Richard Burns	Mitsubishi Lancer Evo VI; Subaru Impreza S6 WRC '00	1:07.9	(Finland) Marcus Grönholm
Leg 2 (19 Aug)	SS11	Juupajoki	30.34 km	(Finland) Marcus Grönholm	Peugeot 206 WRC	15:13.8	(Finland) Marcus Grönholm
Leg 2 (19 Aug)	SS12	Västilä	17.43 km	(Finland) Sebastian Lindholm	Peugeot 206 WRC	8:21.7	(Finland) Marcus Grönholm
Leg 2 (19 Aug)	SS13	Päijälä	12.81 km	(Finland) Juha Kankkunen	Subaru Impreza S6 WRC '00	6:07.0	(Finland) Marcus Grönholm
Leg 2 (19 Aug)	SS14	Ehikki 1	19.08 km	(United Kingdom) Colin McRae	Ford Focus RS WRC '00	9:30.2	(Finland) Marcus Grönholm
Leg 2 (19 Aug)	SS15	Leustu 1	23.58 km	(Finland) Juha Kankkunen	Subaru Impreza S6 WRC '00	11:47.1	(Finland) Marcus Grönholm
Leg 2 (19 Aug)	SS16	Ouninpohja 1	34.21 km	(Finland) Marcus Grönholm	Peugeot 206 WRC	16:29.1	(Finland) Marcus Grönholm
Leg 2 (19 Aug)	SS17	Vaheri 1	25.43 km	(Finland) Marcus Grönholm	Peugeot 206 WRC	12:25.2	(Finland) Marcus Grönholm
Leg 2 (19 Aug)	SS18	Killeri 2	2.23 km	(Finland) Marcus Grönholm	Peugeot 206 WRC	1:08.7	(Finland) Marcus Grönholm
Leg 3 (20 Aug)	SS19	Ehikki 2	19.08 km	(United Kingdom) Colin McRae	Ford Focus RS WRC '00	9:26.3	(Finland) Marcus Grönholm
Leg 3 (20 Aug)	SS20	Moksi	14.67 km	(United Kingdom) Colin McRae	Ford Focus RS WRC '00	7:58.3	(Finland) Marcus Grönholm
Leg 3 (20 Aug)	SS21	Leustu 2	23.58 km	(Finland) Marcus Grönholm	Peugeot 206 WRC	11:41.3	(Finland) Marcus Grönholm
Leg 3 (20 Aug)	SS22	Ouninpohja 2	34.21 km	(Finland) Juha Kankkunen	Subaru Impreza S6 WRC '00	16:21.3	(Finland) Marcus Grönholm
Leg 3 (20 Aug)	SS23	Vaheri 2	25.43 km	(United Kingdom) Colin McRae	Ford Focus RS WRC '00	12:13.3	(Finland) Marcus Grönholm

==== Championship standings ====
Pos.	Drivers' championships			Co-drivers' championships			Manufacturers' championships		
Pos.	Move	Driver	Points	Move	Co-driver	Points	Move	Manufacturer	Points
1	1	(Finland) Marcus Grönholm	44	1	(Finland) Timo Rautiainen	44	1	(United Kingdom) Ford Motor Co. Ltd.	63
2	1	(United Kingdom) Richard Burns	38	1	(United Kingdom) Robert Reid	38	1	(Japan) Subaru World Rally Team	60
3		(United Kingdom) Colin McRae	36		(United Kingdom) Nicky Grist	36		(France) Peugeot Esso	54
4		(Spain) Carlos Sainz	27		(Spain) Luis Moya	27		(Japan) Marlboro Mitsubishi Ralliart	33
5		(Finland) Tommi Mäkinen	26		(Finland) Risto Mannisenmäki	26		(Czech Republic) Škoda Motorsport	8

=== FIA Cup for Production Rally Drivers ===
==== Classification ====
Position		No.	Driver	Co-driver	Entrant	Car	Time	Difference	Points
Event	Class	No.	Driver	Co-driver	Entrant	Car	Time	Difference	Points
16	1	28	(Finland) Jani Paasonen	(Finland) Jakke Honkanen	Mitsubishi Ralliart Finland	Mitsubishi Carisma GT Evo VI	3:37:25.8		10
17	2	27	(Finland) Juuso Pykälistö	(Finland) Esko Mertsalmi	Mitsubishi Ralliart Finland	Mitsubishi Carisma GT Evo VI	3:38:49.2	+1:23.4	6
18	3	26	(Austria) Manfred Stohl	(Austria) Peter Müller	(Austria) Manfred Stohl	Mitsubishi Lancer Evo VI	3:39:05.2	+1:39.4	4
19	4	47	(Finland) Juha Hellman	(Finland) Jani Laaksonen	(Finland) Juha Hellman	Mitsubishi Carisma GT Evo VI	3:41:01.3	+3:35.5	3
20	5	55	(Finland) Hannu Hotanen	(Finland) Jari Jyrkiäinen	(Finland) Hannu Hotanen	Mitsubishi Lancer Evo VI	3:42:28.7	+5:02.9	2
21	6	44	(Sweden) Pernilla Walfridsson	(Sweden) Ulrika Mattsson	(Sweden) Pernilla Walfridsson	Mitsubishi Lancer Evo VI	3:44:51.0	+7:25.2	1
25	7	76	(Finland) Antti Asunta	(Finland) Ilkka Riipinen	(Finland) Antti Asunta	Mitsubishi Carisma GT Evo VI	3:46:26.2	+9:00.4	0
26	8	73	(Finland) Minna Lindroos	(Finland) Sari Kontro-Silvennoinen	(Finland) Minna Lindroos	Mitsubishi Lancer Evo V	3:47:29.7	+10:03.9	0
27	9	37	(Italy) Gianluigi Galli	(Italy) Flavio Zanella	(Italy) Vieffe Corse SRL	Mitsubishi Lancer Evo V	3:50:30.1	+13:04.3	0
29	10	63	(Spain) Ignacio Sanfilippo	(Spain) José Vicente Medina	(Spain) Ignacio Sanfilippo	Mitsubishi Carisma GT Evo VI	3:51:40.0	+14:14.2	0
31	11	68	(Finland) Ari Laivola	(Finland) Markku Laakso	(Finland) Ari Laivola	Mitsubishi Lancer Evo VI	3:54:13.2	+16:47.4	0
32	12	78	(Norway) Stian Engh	(Norway) Henning Isdal	(Norway) Stian Engh	Mitsubishi Lancer Evo VI	3:55:29.8	+18:04.0	0
33	13	64	(Estonia) Toomas Nurmsalu	(Estonia) Jüri Kulli	(Estonia) Toomas Nurmsalu	Mitsubishi Lancer Evo IV	3:56:04.9	+18:39.1	0
35	14	69	(Finland) Mika Rantanen	(Finland) Jarno Tila	(Finland) Mika Rantanen	Mitsubishi Lancer Evo II	4:00:28.9	+23:03.1	0
36	15	94	(Russia) Stanislav Gryazin	(Russia) Dmitriy Eremeev	(Russia) Stanislav Gryazin	Mitsubishi Lancer Evo VI	4:01:13.8	+23:48.0	0
37	16	83	(Finland) Karri Marttila	(Finland) Janne Runtti	(Finland) Karri Marttila	Mitsubishi Carisma GT	4:02:02.1	+24:36.3	0
38	17	95	(Finland) Eero Räikkönen	(Finland) Aki Hietala	(Finland) Eero Räikkönen	Honda Integra Type-R	4:06:49.6	+29:23.8	0
39	18	110	(United Kingdom) Natalie Barratt	(United Kingdom) Joanne Lockwood	(United Kingdom) Natalie Barratt	Mitsubishi Lancer Evo VI	4:09:09.3	+31:43.5	0
40	19	98	(Finland) Pekka Turunen	(Finland) Sami Räsänen	(Finland) Pekka Turunen	Seat Ibiza GTi 16V	4:10:01.3	+32:35.5	0
41	20	109	(Finland) Harri Korkiakoski	(Finland) Jorma Kiimalainen	(Finland) Harri Korkiakoski	Opel Astra GSi 16V	4:19:51.6	+42:25.8	0
42	21	122	(Finland) Petri Uronen	(Finland) Jani Salomaa	(Finland) Petri Uronen	Honda Integra Type-R	4:21:37.5	+44:11.7	0
43	22	127	(Finland) Markku Harju	(Finland) Pekka Leppälä	(Finland) Markku Harju	Ford Escort RS 2000	4:22:53.6	+45:27.8	0
44	23	119	(Germany) Andreas Mansfeld	(Germany) Klaus Hartmann	(Germany) Andreas Mansfeld	Honda Integra Type-R DC2	4:24:55.4	+47:29.6	0
47	24	121	(France) Michel Molinié	(France) Vincent Aubry	(France) Michel Molinié	Mazda 323 GT-R	4:32:45.5	+55:19.7	0
50	25	90	(Japan) Masayuki Yamada	(Japan) Shunichi Washio	(Japan) Masayuki Yamada	Subaru Impreza	4:39:12.6	+1:01:46.8	0
51	26	130	(Italy) Corrado Fontana	(Italy) Rodolfo Messa	(Italy) Corrado Fontana	Peugeot 306 Rallye	4:44:04.0	+1:06:38.2	0
52	27	129	(Finland) Juha-Pekka Järvinen	(Finland) Jyrki Kumpulainen	(Finland) Juha-Pekka Järvinen	Volkswagen Polo 16V	4:46:40.4	+1:09:14.6	0
55	28	132	(Finland) Matti J. Tarvainen	(Finland) Egil Eriksson	(Finland) Matti J. Tarvainen	Škoda Favorit 136 L	5:12:16.5	+1:34:50.7	0
Retired SS22		71	(Finland) Jukka Aho	(Finland) Harri Kiesi	(Finland) Jukka Aho	Mitsubishi Lancer Evo IV	Brakes		0
Retired SS22		105	(Italy) Pierluigi Alessandri	(Italy) Christina Castiglioni	(Italy) Pierluigi Alessandri	Mitsubishi Lancer Evo V	Accident		0
Retired SS21		57	(Finland) Kristian Sohlberg	(Finland) Jussi Aariainen	(Finland) Kristian Sohlberg	Mitsubishi Carisma GT	Mechanical		0
Retired SS20		51	(Finland) Kaj Kuistila	(Finland) Kai Rantanen	(Finland) Kaj Kuistila	Mitsubishi Lancer Evo VI	Punctures		0
Retired SS19		29	(Uruguay) Gustavo Trelles	(Argentina) Jorge Del Buono	(Uruguay) Gustavo Trelles	Mitsubishi Lancer Evo VI	Retired		0
Retired SS19		134	(Germany) Holger Knöbel	(Germany) Manfred Klemme	(Germany) Holger Knöbel	Volkswagen Polo 16V	Mechanical		0
Retired SS18		42	(Finland) Jouni Ampuja	(Finland) Jarmo Lehtinen	(Finland) Jouni Ampuja	Mitsubishi Carisma GT Evo VI	Mechanical		0
Retired SS16		91	(United Kingdom) Mark l'Anson	(United Kingdom) Graeme Walker	(United Kingdom) Mark l'Anson	Mitsubishi Lancer Evo V	Mechanical		0
Retired SS15		32	(Finland) Marko Ipatti	(Finland) Jorma Körkkö	(Finland) Marko Ipatti	Subaru Impreza	Engine		0
Retired SS15		85	(Finland) Kim Jääskeläinen	(Finland) Aulis Ahonen	(Finland) Kim Jääskeläinen	Mitsubishi Carisma GT	Suspension		0
Retired SS15		86	(Japan) Masayuki Akaba	(Japan) Takako Akaba	(Japan) Masayuki Akaba	Mitsubishi Lancer Evo V	Mechanical		0
Retired SS14		103	(Finland) Ville-Pertti Teuronen	(Finland) Mikko Jokinen	(Finland) Ville-Pertti Teuronen	Peugeot 306 S16	Mechanical		0
Retired SS14		126	(France) Jean-Louis Chanet	(France) Pascal Jacoulot	(France) Jean-Louis Chanet	Renault Clio Williams	Mechanical		0
Retired SS13		61	(Finland) Teppo Vekka	(Finland) Ismo Rajamäki	(Finland) Teppo Vekka	Mitsubishi Lancer Evo V	Punctures		0
Retired SS13		131	(Finland) Juhani Länsikorpi	(Sweden) Markku Kangas	(Finland) Juhani Länsikorpi	Volkswagen Polo 16V	Punctures		0
Retired SS12		25	(Finland) Jouko Puhakka	(Finland) Tomi Tuominen	(Finland) Tri-Racing Team	Mitsubishi Lancer Evo VI	Steering		0
Retired SS12		40	(Argentina) Claudio Marcelo Menzi	(Argentina) Edgardo Galindo	(Argentina) Claudio Marcelo Menzi	Mitsubishi Lancer Evo VI	Accident		0
Retired SS12		53	(Finland) Jari Ketomaa	(Finland) Petri Lantta	(Finland) Jari Ketomaa	Subaru Impreza 555	Accident		0
Retired SS12		96	(Finland) Aki Keinänen	(Finland) Asko Sairanen	(Finland) Aki Keinänen	Honda Integra Type-R	Accident		0
Retired SS11		50	(United Kingdom) David Higgins	(United Kingdom) Shaun O'Gorman	(United Kingdom) David Higgins	Subaru Impreza WRX	Mechanical		0
Retired SS11		108	(Finland) Petri Norojärvi	(Finland) Eero Haarjarvi	(Finland) Petri Norojärvi	Opel Astra GSi 16V	Mechanical		0
Retired SS10		128	(Finland) Lasse Laine	(Finland) Jouni Laine	(Finland) Lasse Laine	Suzuki Swift GTi	Gearbox		0
Retired SS8		97	(Finland) Jani Ylipahkala	(Finland) Markku Laurila	(Finland) Jani Ylipahkala	Opel Astra GSi 16V	Mechanical		0
Retired SS8		107	(Finland) Erno Randelin	(Finland) Juha-Pekka Kauppinen	(Finland) Erno Randelin	Opel Astra GSi 16V	Driveshaft		0
Retired SS8		118	(United Kingdom) Oliver Clark	(Venezuela) Ana Goñi	(United Kingdom) Oliver Clark	Mitsubishi Lancer Evo IV	Mechanical		0
Retired SS8		123	(Finland) Kyosti Laihanen	(Finland) Markku Pylkko	(Finland) Kyosti Laihanen	Opel Astra GSi 16V	Accident		0
Retired SS8		125	(Republic of Ireland) Rory Galligan	(United Kingdom) Herbie Blackburn	(Republic of Ireland) Rory Galligan	Opel Astra GSi 16V	Accident		0
Retired SS6		35	(Sweden) Kenneth Bäcklund	(Sweden) Tord Andersson	(Sweden) Kenneth Bäcklund	Mitsubishi Lancer Evo VI	Engine		0
Retired SS6		92	(Italy) Marco Menegatto	(Italy) Roberto Vittori	(Italy) Marco Menegatto	Mitsubishi Lancer Evo VI	Accident		0
Retired SS5		52	(Finland) Juha Salo	(Finland) Petri Keto	(Finland) Juha Salo	Mitsubishi Lancer Evo III	Mechanical		0
Retired SS4		54	(Finland) Hannu Jokinen	(Finland) Mika Peltonen	(Finland) Hannu Jokinen	Mitsubishi Lancer Evo II	Engine		0
Retired SS4		62	(Estonia) Margus Murakas	(Estonia) Peep Kallaste	(Estonia) Margus Murakas	Subaru Impreza WRX	Mechanical		0
Retired SS3		66	(Finland) Janne Perälä	(Finland) Jouni Lampinen	(Finland) Janne Perälä	Mitsubishi Lancer Evo VI	Engine		0
Retired SS3		89	(Russia) Andrey Zhigunov	(Russia) Igor Ter-Oganesiants	(Russia) Andrey Zhigunov	Mitsubishi Lancer Evo IV	Accident		0
Retired SS2		36	(Oman) Hamed Al-Wahaibi	(New Zealand) Tony Sircombe	(Oman) Arab World Rally Team	Subaru Impreza WRX STI RA	Driveshaft		0
Retired SS2		41	(Spain) Jesús Puras	(Spain) Marc Martí	(Spain) Jesús Puras	Mitsubishi Lancer Evo VI	Retired		0
Retired SS2		43	(Argentina) Gabriel Pozzo	(Argentina) Fabian Cretu	(Argentina) Gabriel Pozzo	Mitsubishi Lancer Evo VI	Retired		0
Retired SS2		99	(Finland) Ilkka Kärpänen	(Finland) Jaakko Jäntti	(Finland) Ilkka Kärpänen	Opel Astra GSi 16V	Gearbox		0
Retired SS2		112	(Finland) Henri Nyström	(Finland) Kalevi Lonka	(Finland) Henri Nyström	Ford Escort RS 2000	Oil sump		0
Retired SS1		67	(Finland) Jyri Poltto	(Finland) Aki Suutarinen	(Finland) Jyri Poltto	Mitsubishi Lancer Evo II	Accident		0

==== Special stages ====
Day	Stage	Stage name	Length	Winner	Car	Time	Class leaders
Leg 1 (18 Aug)	SS1	Kuohu	7.67 km	(Finland) Juuso Pykälistö	Mitsubishi Carisma GT Evo VI	3:58.3	(Finland) Juuso Pykälistö
Leg 1 (18 Aug)	SS2	Parkkola	20.11 km	(Finland) Jouko Puhakka	Mitsubishi Lancer Evo VI	10:46.5	(Finland) Jouko Puhakka
Leg 1 (18 Aug)	SS3	Mökkiperä	13.39 km	(Finland) Juuso Pykälistö	Mitsubishi Carisma GT Evo VI	6:58.0	(Finland) Jouko Puhakka
Leg 1 (18 Aug)	SS4	Muittari	13.51 km	(Finland) Jani Paasonen	Mitsubishi Carisma GT Evo VI	6:27.0	(Finland) Jouko Puhakka
Leg 1 (18 Aug)	SS5	Konttimäki	13.08 km	(Finland) Juuso Pykälistö	Mitsubishi Carisma GT Evo VI	6:03.5	(Finland) Jouko Puhakka
Leg 1 (18 Aug)	SS6	Palsankylä	13.90 km	(Finland) Jani Paasonen	Mitsubishi Carisma GT Evo VI	8:04.8	(Finland) Jouko Puhakka
Leg 1 (18 Aug)	SS7	Valkola	8.40 km	(Finland) Juuso Pykälistö	Mitsubishi Carisma GT Evo VI	4:45.5	(Finland) Jouko Puhakka
Leg 1 (18 Aug)	SS8	Lankamaa	23.44 km	(Finland) Jani Paasonen	Mitsubishi Carisma GT Evo VI	12:28.0	(Finland) Jani Paasonen
Leg 1 (18 Aug)	SS9	Laukaa	12.37 km	(Austria) Manfred Stohl	Mitsubishi Lancer Evo VI	6:39.5	(Finland) Jani Paasonen
Leg 1 (18 Aug)	SS10	Killeri 1	2.23 km	(Sweden) Pernilla Walfridsson	Mitsubishi Lancer Evo VI	1:11.4	(Finland) Jani Paasonen
Leg 2 (19 Aug)	SS11	Juupajoki	30.34 km	(Finland) Jani Paasonen	Mitsubishi Carisma GT Evo VI	16:04.2	(Finland) Jani Paasonen
Leg 2 (19 Aug)	SS12	Västilä	17.43 km	(Italy) Gianluigi Galli	Mitsubishi Lancer Evo V	8:47.4	(Finland) Jani Paasonen
Leg 2 (19 Aug)	SS13	Päijälä	12.81 km	(Finland) Juuso Pykälistö	Mitsubishi Carisma GT Evo VI	6:24.0	(Finland) Jani Paasonen
Leg 2 (19 Aug)	SS14	Ehikki 1	19.08 km	(Finland) Juuso Pykälistö	Mitsubishi Carisma GT Evo VI	10:08.6	(Finland) Jani Paasonen
Leg 2 (19 Aug)	SS15	Leustu 1	23.58 km	(Finland) Juuso Pykälistö	Mitsubishi Carisma GT Evo VI	12:38.4	(Finland) Jani Paasonen
Leg 2 (19 Aug)	SS16	Ouninpohja 1	34.21 km	(Finland) Jani Paasonen	Mitsubishi Carisma GT Evo VI	17:26.4	(Finland) Jani Paasonen
Leg 2 (19 Aug)	SS17	Vaheri 1	25.43 km	(Finland) Juuso Pykälistö	Mitsubishi Carisma GT Evo VI	13:15.4	(Finland) Jani Paasonen
Leg 2 (19 Aug)	SS18	Killeri 2	2.23 km	(Finland) Karri Marttila	Mitsubishi Carisma GT	1:19.1	(Finland) Jani Paasonen
Leg 3 (20 Aug)	SS19	Ehikki 2	19.08 km	(Austria) Manfred Stohl	Mitsubishi Lancer Evo VI	10:11.7	(Finland) Jani Paasonen
Leg 3 (20 Aug)	SS20	Moksi	14.67 km	(Finland) Juuso Pykälistö	Mitsubishi Carisma GT Evo VI	8:44.6	(Finland) Jani Paasonen
Leg 3 (20 Aug)	SS21	Leustu 2	23.58 km	(Italy) Gianluigi Galli	Mitsubishi Lancer Evo V	12:50.7	(Finland) Jani Paasonen
Leg 3 (20 Aug)	SS22	Ouninpohja 2	34.21 km	(Austria) Manfred Stohl	Mitsubishi Lancer Evo VI	17:26.1	(Finland) Jani Paasonen
Leg 3 (20 Aug)	SS23	Vaheri 2	25.43 km	(Finland) Hannu Hotanen	Mitsubishi Lancer Evo VI	13:16.9	(Finland) Jani Paasonen

==== Championship standings ====
Pos.	Drivers' championships		
Pos.	Move	Driver	Points
1		(Austria) Manfred Stohl	45
2		(Uruguay) Gustavo Trelles	34
3	3	(Finland) Jani Paasonen	21
4	1	(Argentina) Gabriel Pozzo	16
5	1	(Portugal) Miguel Campos	13
