= 2001 Formula Rally Championship =

The 2001 Formula Rally Championship was a one off series for rally cars running to Super 1600 regulations. The championship was run as a replacement for the cancelled 2001 British Rally Championship. Technical regulations stated that cars must not cost more than $100,000 and only 4 mechanics were allowed to work on a single car in services to control costs. Rallies in the series also counted as point scoring rounds for the one make Ford Puma, Ford Ka, Volkswagen Polo and Peugeot 106 championships. The series was won by 1998 British Rally Champion Martin Rowe after Justin Dale and the Peugeot Works Team were excluded from the championship due to a homologation issue at the final round. The same homologation issues also led to the exclusion of the Works Proton team and its driver Mats Andersson. Ford were the manufacturers champions.

== Calendar ==
Round	Event	Date
1	Rapid Fit Rally of Wirral	12 May
2	Silverstone Rally	9 June
3	R&M Williams Welsh Rally	12 August
4	Kumho Tyres Scottish Rally	15 September
5	Barretts Rally of Kent	13 October
6	Jim Clark Memorial Rally	2–3 November
7	Prodrive Banbury Rally	10 November

== Entry list ==
Entrant	Manufacturer	Car	No	Driver	Rounds
Satria Rally Team (Harry Hockly Motorsport)	Proton	Satria Kit Car	1	Mats Andersson	All
Satria Rally Team (Harry Hockly Motorsport)	Proton	Satria Kit Car	2	Neil Collins	1-2
Volkswagen Motorsport (SBG Sport)	Volkswagen	Polo GTI	3	Neil Simpson	1-2
Volkswagen Motorsport (SBG Sport)	Volkswagen	Polo GTI	3	David Higgins	4-7
Peugeot Sport UK	Peugeot	106 Maxi	5	Justin Dale	All
Rapid Fit Ford Racing	Ford	Puma S1600	7	Martin Rowe	All
Rapid Fit Ford Racing	Ford	Puma S1600	8	Patrick Magaud	All
Rapid Fit Ford Racing	Ford	Puma S1600	9	Francois Duval	2, 5
Martin Meadows	Proton	Satria Kit Car	11	Martin Meadows	All
Christer Steén	Skoda	Felicia Kit Car	12	Christer Steén	1
Robert Woodside	Ford	Puma S1600	14	Robert Woodside	All
Sanspeed	Peugeot	106 Maxi	15	Martin Sansom	All
Faintree Motorsport	Citroen	Saxo Kit Car	17	Paul Wedgbury	All
Major Motorsport	Ford	Puma S1600	18	Simon Mauger	1-3
Major Motorsport	Proton	Satria Kit Car	18	Simon Mauger	5-7
Asquith Autosport	Citroen	Saxo Kit Car	19	Max McKillen	1, 2, 3, 5, 6, 7
Ian Barrett	Proton	Satria Kit Car	21	Ian Barrett	All
Gethin Jones	Vauxhall	Corsa Kit Car	26	Gethin Jones	1
David Henderson	Ford	Puma 1400	34	David Henderson	All
Rory Galligan	Peugeot	106 GTI	29	Rory Galligan	All
Ryan Champion	Peugeot	106 GTI	32	Ryan Champion	All
Shaun Woffinden	Ford	Puma 1400	33	Shaun Woffinden	All
Guy Wilks	Ford	Puma 1400	35	Guy Wilks	All
Kris Meeke	Peugeot	106 GTI	50	Kris Meeke	All
Garry Jennings	Peugeot	106 GTI	76	Garry Jennings	All
Michael Brew	Peugeot	106 GTI	30	Michael Brew	All
Darren Snape	Ford	Ka	55	Darren Snape	All
Ian Forgan	Ford	Ka	56	Ian Forgan	All
Jack Ingleby	Ford	Ka	57	Jack Ingleby	All
David Bateson	Volkswagen	Polo 16v	44	David Bateson	All
Clive Wheeler	Volkswagen	Polo 16v	45	Clive Wheeler	All
Adrian Kermode	Volkswagen	Polo 16v	47	Adrian Kermode	All
James Smith	Volkswagen	Polo 16v	62	James Smith	All
Simon Selby	Ford	Puma 1400	51	Simon Selby	All
Mark Wheeler	Ford	Puma 1400	38	Mark Wheeler	All

== Drivers Championship ==
Pos	Entrant	R1	R2	R3	R4	R5	R6	R7	Pts
EX	Justin Dale	6	6	10	10	(6)	0	10	42
1	Martin Rowe	10	10	6	0	(4)	10	6	42
2	Patrick Magaud	4	3	0	4	0	4	0	15
3	François Duval	-	4	-	-	10	-	-	14
4	David Higgins	-	-	-	1	-	6	4	11
=	Martin Sansom	3	0	0	3	3	0	2	11
6	Simon Mauger	2	1	-	1	2	3	1	10
EX	Mats Andersson	1	1	0	6	0	1	0	9
7	David Henderson	0	0	4	0	0	0	0	4
8	Max McKillen	0	0	0	0	0	0	3	3
=	Michael Brew	0	0	3	0	0	0	0	3
10	Garry Jennings	0	0	2	0	0	0	0	2
=	Paul Wedgbury	0	0	0	2	0	0	0	2
12	Rory Galligan	0	0	1	0	0	0	0	1
13	Neil Simpson	0	0	0	0	0	0	0	0
=	Neil Collins	0	0	0	0	0	0	0	0

== Manufacturers Championship ==
Pos	Entrant	R1	R2	R3	R4	R5	R6	R7	Pts
1	Ford	20	20	15	(12)	20	20	(15)	95
EX	Peugeot	15	15	20	20	(15)	0	20	90
2	Volkswagen	0	8	0	8	0	17	15	48
EX	Proton	12	12	0	15	0	10	0	45
