= 1984 British Rally Championship =

Seasons
- ← 1983 1985 →

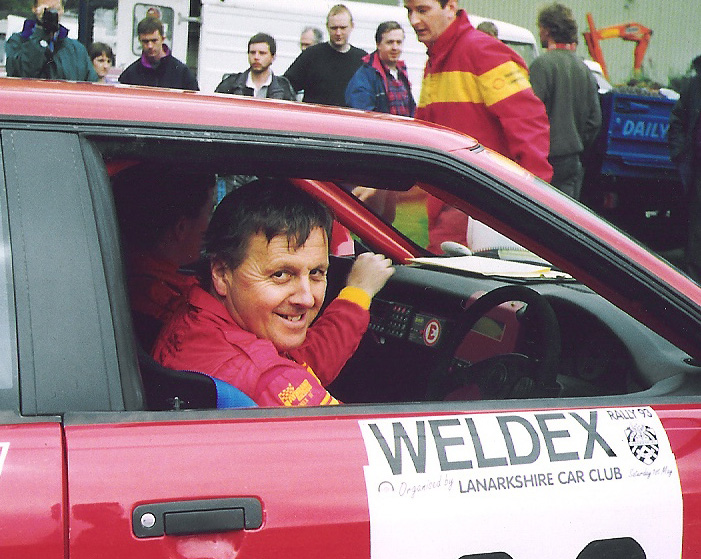
Jimmy McRae, winner of the 1984 British Rally Championship

The 1984 British Open Rally Championship season consisted of six rallies held across the British Isles and was won by the Scot Jimmy McRae. He may have only won the final rally of the season at the Manx Rally to clinch the 1984 title but he got four podium finishes, enough to beat out his rival and triple winner Hannu Mikkola, the defending World Rally Champion from Joensuu, Finland.

== Results ==
#	Event	1st	2nd	3rd
1	National Breakdown Rally (York)	Hannu Mikkola/Arne Hertz	Jimmy McRae/Mike Nicholson	Russell Brookes/Mike Broad
2	Rothman's Circuit of Ireland (Belfast)	Billy Coleman/Ronan Morgan	Ernest Kidney/Seamus McCanny	Davy Evans/Roy Kernaghan
3	Castrol Welsh Rally (Llandrindod)	Hannu Mikkola/Arne Hertz	Russell Brookes/Mike Broad	Malcolm Wilson/Nigel Harris
4	Lloyds Bowmaker Scottish Rally (Glasgow)	Hannu Mikkola/Arne Hertz	Jimmy McRae/Mike Nicholson	Russell Brookes/Mike Broad
5	Rentatruck Ulster Rally (Belfast)	Walter Röhrl/Christian Geistdörfer	Russell Brookes/Mike Broad	Jimmy McRae/Mike Nicholson
6	Rothmans Manx International Rally (Douglas)	Jimmy McRae/Mike Nicholson	Bertie Fisher/Austin Frazer	Tony Pond/Rob Arthur

== Standings ==
Pos	Driver	R1	R2	R3	R4	R5	R6	Pts
1	(United Kingdom) Jimmy McRae	2nd	DNF	4th	2nd	3rd	1st	57
2	(Finland) Hannu Mikkola	1st		1st	1st		DNF	45
3	(United Kingdom) Russell Brookes	3rd	DNF	2nd	3rd	2nd	DNF	44
4	(Sweden) Per Eklund	4th		5th	4th	DNF	7th	26
5	(United Kingdom) Bertie Fisher		DNF	6th	DNF	4th	2nd	25
6	(Republic of Ireland) Billy Coleman		1st			5th		21
7	(United Kingdom) Ian Tilke	5th		7th	8th	7th		17
8	(Germany) Walter Röhrl					1st		15
9	(United Kingdom) Davy Evans		3rd			14th	6th	15
10	(United Kingdom) Tim Brise	7th	8th		5th	DNF		13
11	(United Kingdom) Ernest Kidney		2nd					12
12	(United Kingdom) Malcolm Wilson	DNF		3rd	DNF	DNF		10
13	(United Kingdom) Tony Pond						3rd	10
14	(United Kingdom) John Price		4th				10th	9
15	(United Kingdom) Ian Corkill						4th	8
16	(United Kingdom) Kenny McKinstry		6th			8th		8
17	(United Kingdom) Alan Johnston		5th	10th	DNF			7
18	(United Kingdom) Theo Bengry						5th	6
19	(United Kingdom) David Mann	10th	7th		DNF	10th		6
20	(United Kingdom) John Weatherley	6th						5
21	(United Kingdom) Donald Heggie				6th			5
22	(United Kingdom) Cyril Bolton					6th	DNF	5
23	(United Kingdom) Vince Wetton				7th			4
24	(United Kingdom) Mark Lovell			9th	37th	DNF	9th	4
25	(United Kingdom) Chuck Nicholson	8th						3
26	(United Kingdom) Russell Gooding			8th				3
27	(Finland) Mikael Sundström	DNF					8th	3
28	(United Kingdom) Mike Jackson	9th						2
29	(United Kingdom) Warren Craig		9th					2
30	(United Kingdom) Chris Lord	DNF	DNF		9th		DNF	2
31	(Republic of Ireland) Pat Dunnion					9th		2
32	(United Kingdom) Julian Roderick		10th					1
33	(United Kingdom) Wilson Girvan				10th			1
