= 2026 British Rally Championship =

Rallying series

The 2026 British Rally Championship was a rallying series run over the course of a year, that comprised five tarmac and gravel surface events. 2026 was the 68th season of the series. The championship had three events in Wales, two in Scotland.

The championship was decided by a last round battle at the Cambrian Rally between the Toyota GR Yaris Rally2s of Osian Pryce/James Morgan and Meirion Evans/Dale Furniss both on the Melvyn Evans Motorsport team and the Skoda Fabia RS Rally 2 of Max Mcrae/Cameron Fair. After Mcrae/Fair suffered a spin in the 3rd stage of the event which lost them 15 seconds and Evans/Furniss got stuck in a ditch on stage 5, Pryce/Morgan would take the rally win by 1.2 seconds despite engine troubles throughout the day. This gave them the Championship trophy, making Pryce a double champion after his 2022 Victory.

The Junior section of the championship was won by Luke Constantine and Ifan Devine in an Opel Corsa Rally4.

== 2026 calendar ==
For season 2026 there would be six events, three on gravel and three on closed road tarmac surfaces.

In mid-May 2026 the organisers announced the cancellation of the third round of the series, the Carlisle Stages which was originally scheduled for 5 June 2026. A low number of entries was cited as the reason. Championship organisers will provide further information as it develops.

Round	Dates	Event	Rally HQ	Surface	Website
1	11 April	(Wales) Severn Valley Stages	Builth Wells	Gravel	(website)
2	22–23 May	(Scotland) Jim Clark Rally	Duns	Tarmac	(website)
-	Cancelled	(England) Kielder Carlisle Stages	Carlisle	Gravel	(website)
3	7–8 August	(Scotland) Grampian Forest Rally	Banchory	Gravel	(website)
4	4–6 September	(Wales) Rali Ceredigion	Aberystwyth	Tarmac	(website)
5	24 October	(Wales) Cambrian Rally	Llandudno	Gravel	(website)

== Results ==
Round	Rally name	Podium finishers			
Round	Rally name	Placing	Driver / Co-Driver	Car	Time / Diff leader
1	Severn Valley Stages (11 April)	1	Osian Pryce / James Morgan	Toyota GR Yaris Rally2	48:26.9
1	Severn Valley Stages (11 April)	2	Merion Evans / Dale Furniss	Toyota GR Yaris Rally2	+ 0:19.0
1	Severn Valley Stages (11 April)	3	Garry Pearson / Hannah McKillop	Ford Fiesta Rally2	+ 1:07.9
2	Jim Clark Rally (22 May)	1	Max McRae / Cameron Fair	Škoda Fabia RS Rally2	1:13:35.1
2	Jim Clark Rally (22 May)	2	Merion Evans / Dale Furniss	Toyota GR Yaris Rally2	+ 0:30.0
2	Jim Clark Rally (22 May)	3	Osian Pryce / James Morgan	Toyota GR Yaris Rally2	+ 1:02.6
3	Carlisle Stages Rally (5 June) Cancelled	1	-	-	-
3	Carlisle Stages Rally (5 June) Cancelled	2	-	-	-
3	Carlisle Stages Rally (5 June) Cancelled	3	-	-	-
4	Grampian Forest Rally (7 August)	1	Osian Pryce / James Morgan	Toyota GR Yaris Rally2	52:59.2
4	Grampian Forest Rally (7 August)	2	Max McRae / Cameron Fair	Škoda Fabia RS Rally2	+ 0:26.1
4	Grampian Forest Rally (7 August)	3	Merion Evans / Dale Furniss	Toyota GR Yaris Rally2	+ 0:27.4
5	Rali Ceredigion (4September)	1	Max McRae / Cameron Fair	Škoda Fabia RS Rally2	1:31:29.1
5	Rali Ceredigion (4September)	2	Merion Evans / Dale Furniss	Toyota GR Yaris Rally2	+ 0:07.4
5	Rali Ceredigion (4September)	3	Kalum Graffin / Rhodri Evans	Ford Fiesta Rally3	+ 7:05.3
6	Cambrian Rally (24 October)	1	Osian Pryce / James Morgan	Toyota GR Yaris Rally2	49:55.7
6	Cambrian Rally (24 October)	2	Max McRae / Cameron Fair	Škoda Fabia RS Rally2	+ 0:01.2
6	Cambrian Rally (24 October)	3	Charles Tuthill / Sion Williams	Ford Fiesta Rally3	+ 4:21.9

== Championship standings ==
=== Scoring system ===
Top finishing crews score points as follows: 25, 18, 15, 12, 10, 8, 6, 4, 2.

Drivers may nominate one event as their 'joker', on which if they finish in the top five they will score additional points: 5, 4, 3, 2, 1.

Position	1st	2nd	3rd	4th	5th	6th	7th	8th	9th	10th
Points	25	18	15	12	10	8	6	4	2	1
Joker Points	5	4	3	2	1					

For the final round the points total for that rally will be multiplied by 1.5. Joker points will not be effected by this multiplier Following the cancellation of the 'Carlisle Stages', 'Rali Ceredigion' will become a double-header in 2026, offering two points-scoring opportunities.

Competitors five best scores will count towards their championship total.

=== 2026 BRC Championship Standings ===
Drivers

Pos	Driver	SEV	JCR	CSR	GFR	RCD1	RCD2	CAM	Points
1	Osian Pryce	25	15	C	25	18	Ret	42.5*	125.5
2	Max McRae	12	25	C	18	30*	18	27	118
3	Meirion Evans	18	18	C	15	15	30*	Ret	96
4	Luke Constantine	Ret	1*	C	8	6	10	15	40
5	Garry Pearson	15	10	C	14*	DNS	DNS	DNS	39
Pos	Driver	SEV	JCR	CSR	GFR	RCD1	RCD2	CAM	Pts

Key
Colour	Result
Gold	Winner
Silver	2nd place
Bronze	3rd place
Green	Non-podium finish
Purple	Did not finish (Ret)
Black	Disqualified (DSQ)
Black	Excluded (EXC)
White	Did not start (DNS)
*	Joker played
