= Everything Must Go =

Everything Must Go may refer to:

== Film and television ==
- Everything Must Go (film), a 2010 American film starring Will Ferrell
- "Everything Must Go" (Good Girls), a television episode
- "Everything Must Go" (How I Met Your Mother), a television episode

== Music ==
- Everything Must Go (Manic Street Preachers album), 1996
  - "Everything Must Go" (song), the title song
- Everything Must Go (Steely Dan album) or the title song, 2003
- Everything Must Go (Vol. 1), a mixtape by T-Pain, 2018
- "Everything Must Go", an album by Goose, 2025
- "Everything Must Go", a song by Dizzee Rascal from Raskit, 2017
- "Everything Must Go", a song by Taking Back Sunday from New Again, 2009
- "Everything Must Go!", a song by the Weakerthans from Left and Leaving, 2000
- "Everything Must Go", a song by Tyler, the Creator from Call Me If You Get Lost: The Estate Sale, 2023

== Other uses ==
- Everything Must Go (novel), a 1969 novel by Keith Waterhouse
- "Everything Must Go!", a graffiti mural by Daniel Doherty in the Mission District of San Francisco, California
- As a marketing term commonly used in Closeout sales.
