= 2024 British Rally Championship =

Rallying series

The British Rally Championship is a rallying series run over the course of a year, that comprises six tarmac and gravel surface events. 2024 is to be the 66th season of the series. The season begins in Lancashire on 22 March and is due to conclude on 26 October in the Welsh forests.

== Calendar ==
For season 2024 there will be six events, three on gravel and three on closed road tarmac surfaces.

| Round | Dates | Event | Rally HQ | Surface | Website |
|---|---|---|---|---|---|
| 1 | 22–23 March | (England) North West Stages | Garstang | Tarmac | (website) |
| 2 | 13 April | (Wales) Severn Valley Stages | Builth Wells | Gravel | (website) |
| 3 | 24–25 May | (Scotland) Jim Clark Rally | Duns | Tarmac | (website) |
| 4 | 9–10 August | (Scotland) Grampian Forest Rally | Banchory | Gravel | (website) |
| 5 | 31 August–1 September | (Wales) Rali Ceredigion | Aberystwyth | Tarmac | (website) |
| 6 | 26 October | (Wales) Cambrian Rally | Llandudno | Gravel | (website) |

== Results ==
| Round | Rally name | Podium finishers | | | |
| Round | Rally name | Placing | Driver / Co-Driver | Car | Time / Diff leader |
|---|---|---|---|---|---|
| 1 | North West Stages (23/24 March) | 1 | Chris Ingram / Alex Kihurani | Volkswagen Polo GTI R5 | 44:02.4 |
| 1 | North West Stages (23/24 March) | 2 | William Creighton / Liam Regan | Ford Fiesta Rally2 | + 00:27.0 |
| 1 | North West Stages (23/24 March) | 3 | Meirion Evans / Jonathan Jackson | Ford Fiesta Rally2 | + 00:48.1 |
| 2 | Severn Valley Stages (13 April) | 1 | Osian Pryce / Rhodri Evans | Ford Fiesta Rally2 | 1:00:32.3 |
| 2 | Severn Valley Stages (13 April) | 2 | William Creighton / Liam Regan | Ford Fiesta Rally2 | + 00:20.0 |
| 2 | Severn Valley Stages (13 April) | 3 | Chris Ingram / Alex Kihurani | Volkswagen Polo GTI R5 | + 00:34.3 |
| 3 | Jim Clark Rally (24/25 May) | 1 | Keith Cronin / Mikie Galvin | Ford Fiesta Rally2 | 1:14:59.8 |
| 3 | Jim Clark Rally (24/25 May) | 2 | William Creighton / Liam Regan | Ford Fiesta Rally2 | + 00:19.1 |
| 3 | Jim Clark Rally (24/25 May) | 3 | Garry Pearson / Daniel Barritt | Ford Fiesta Rally2 | + 00:28.1 |
| 4 | Grampian Forest Rally (9/10 August) | 1 | Chris Ingram / Alex Kihurani | Toyota GR Yaris Rally2 | 51:43.6 |
| 4 | Grampian Forest Rally (9/10 August) | 2 | Osian Pryce / Rhodri Evans | Ford Fiesta Rally2 | + 00:9.0 |
| 4 | Grampian Forest Rally (9/10 August) | 3 | Keith Cronin / Mikie Galvin | Ford Fiesta Rally2 | + 00:28.7 |
| 5 | Rali Ceredigion (31 August/1 September) | 1 | William Creighton / Liam Regan | Ford Fiesta Rally2 | 31:56.7 |
| 5 | Rali Ceredigion (31 August/1 September) | 2 | Jon Armstrong / Eoin Treacy | Ford Fiesta Rally2 | + 00:0.2 |
| 5 | Rali Ceredigion (31 August/1 September) | 3 | Matt Edwards / David Moyniham | Ford Fiesta Rally2 | + 00:10.9 |
| 6 | Cambrian Rally (26 October) | 1 | Chris Ingram / Alex Kihurani | Toyota GR Yaris Rally2 | 54:42.4 |
| 6 | Cambrian Rally (26 October) | 2 | William Creighton / Liam Regan | Ford Fiesta Rally2 | + 00:20.8 |
| 6 | Cambrian Rally (26 October) | 3 | Osian Pryce / Rhodri Evans | Ford Fiesta Rally2 | +00:46.0 |

== Drivers Championship standings ==
=== Scoring system ===
Top finishing crews score points as follows: 25, 18, 15, 12, 10, 8, 6, 4, 2. All crews who finish a rally will be awarded 1 point.

Drivers may nominate one event as their 'joker', on which if they finish in the top five they will score additional points: 5, 4, 3, 2, 1.

| Position | 1st | 2nd | 3rd | 4th | 5th | 6th | 7th | 8th | 9th | 10th |
| Points | 25 | 18 | 15 | 12 | 10 | 8 | 6 | 4 | 2 | 1 |
| Joker Points | 5 | 4 | 3 | 2 | 1 | | | | | |

There will be two full points scoring opportunities on the Rali Ceredigion. Full championship points will be available in both Leg 1 and Leg 2 of the rally.

For the final round of the Championship, the points total for that rally will be multiplied by 1.5. Joker points will not be effected by this multiplier

Competitors five best scores will count towards their championship total.

=== 2024 BRC Championship Standings ===
Drivers

| Pos | Driver | NWS | SVS | JCR | GFR | RC1 | RC2 | CAM | Points |
|---|---|---|---|---|---|---|---|---|---|
| 1 | Chris Ingram | 26 | 16 | 1* | 26 | 26 | 1 | 38.5 | 132.5 |
| 2 | William Creighton | 19 | 19 | 19 | 13 | 1 | 26 | 32* | 115 |
| 3 | Osian Pryce | 1 | 26 | 1 | 19 | 16 | 13 | 26.5* | 100.5 |
| 4 | Keith Cronin | 9 | 1 | 26 | 16 | 23* | 1 | 1 | 75 |
| 5 | Garry Pearson | 3 | 11 | 16 | 8* | 1 | 9 | 16 | 60 |
| Pos | Driver | NWS | SVS | JCR | GFR | RC1 | RC2 | CAM | Pts |

Key
| Colour | Result |
|---|---|
| Gold | Winner |
| Silver | 2nd place |
| Bronze | 3rd place |
| Green | Non-podium finish |
| Purple | Did not finish (Ret) |
| Black | Disqualified (DSQ) |
| Black | Excluded (EXC) |
| White | Did not start (DNS) |
| * | Joker played |

Co-Drivers

| Pos | Driver | NWS | SVS | JCR | GFR | RC1 | RC2 | CAM | Points |
|---|---|---|---|---|---|---|---|---|---|
| 1 | Alex Kihurani | 26 | 16 | 1* | 26 | 26 | 1 | 38.5 | 132.5 |
| 2 | Liam Regan | 19 | 19 | 19 | 13 | 1 | 26 | 32* | 115 |
| 3 | Rhodri Evans | 1 | 26 | 1 | 19 | 16 | 13 | 26.5* | 100.5 |
| 4 | Mikie Galvin | 9 | 1 | 26 | 16 | 23* | 1 | 1 | 75 |
| 5 | Daniel Barritt | 3 | 11 | 16 | 8* | 1 | 9 | 16 | 60 |
| Pos | Driver | NWS | SVS | JCR | GFR | RC1 | RC2 | CAM | Pts |
