= 2003 British Rally Championship =

Seasons
- ← 2002 2004 →

The 2003 British Rally Championship season was the 45th season of the British Rally Championship. The season consisted of seven rounds — the Rally of Wales, scheduled for 22–23 March, was cancelled — and began on 25 April, with the Pirelli International Rally in the north east of England. The season ended on 26 October, at the Tempest South of England Rally. The series was organised by the Royal Scottish Automobile Club.

The title was won by Englishman Jonny Milner and Welsh co-driver Nicky Beech, driving a Toyota Corolla WRC.

== Entry list ==
Constructor	Car	Driver	Co-Driver	Rds.
Alfa Romeo	Alfa Romeo 147 S1600	(United Kingdom) Steve Hill	(United Kingdom) Jim Kitson	1, 3
Alfa Romeo	Alfa Romeo 147 S1600	(United Kingdom) Steve Hill	(United Kingdom) Joanne Lockwood	4-7
Citroën	Citroën Saxo S1600	(Finland) Aki Teiskonen	(Finland) Miika Teiskonen	6
Fiat	Fiat Punto S1600	(San Marino) Mirco Baldacci	(Italy) Giovanni Bernacchini	1
Fiat	Fiat Punto S1600	(San Marino) Mirco Baldacci	(Italy) Simone Scattolin	2
Fiat	Fiat Punto S1600	(United Kingdom) Leon Pesticcio	(United Kingdom) Timothy Sturla	1–5, 7
Ford	Ford Escort WRC	(United Kingdom) Chris Mellors	(United Kingdom) Craig Thorley	6
Ford	Ford Focus RS WRC '01	(Finland) Jari-Matti Latvala	(United Kingdom) Carl Williamson	1-3
Ford	Ford Focus RS WRC '01	(Finland) Jari-Matti Latvala	(Finland) Miikka Anttila	4-7
Ford	Ford Puma S1600	(United Kingdom) Ryan Champion	(United Kingdom) Cliff Simmons	1-6
Ford	Ford Puma S1600	(United Kingdom) Barry Clark	(United Kingdom) Neil Shanks	1-6
Ford	Ford Puma S1600	(Norway) Martin Stenshorne	(United Kingdom) Clive Jenkins	1
Hyundai	Hyundai Accent WRC	(United Kingdom) Steve Petch	(United Kingdom) John Richardson	1, 6
MG	MG ZR S1600	(United Kingdom) Gwyndaf Evans	(United Kingdom) Howard Davies	1
MG	MG ZR S1600	(United Kingdom) Gwyndaf Evans	(United Kingdom) Claire Mole	2, 4-6
MG	MG ZR 160	(United Kingdom) Gwyndaf Evans	(United Kingdom) Claire Mole	3
Mitsubishi	Mitsubishi Lancer Evo VI	(United Kingdom) Barry Groundwater	(United Kingdom) Jude Wylie	6
Mitsubishi	Mitsubishi Lancer Evo VI	(United Kingdom) Mark I'Anson	(United Kingdom) Graeme Walker	1, 3
Mitsubishi	Mitsubishi Lancer Evo VI	(United Kingdom) Mark I'Anson	(United Kingdom) Toby I'Anson	7
Mitsubishi	Mitsubishi Lancer Evo VI	(United Kingdom) James Thompson	(United Kingdom) Richard Pulleyn	1
Mitsubishi	Mitsubishi Lancer Evo 6.5	(United Kingdom) James Thompson	(United Kingdom) Richard Pulleyn	2-4
Mitsubishi	Mitsubishi Lancer Evo VIII	(Republic of Ireland) Roy White	(Republic of Ireland) Greg Shinnors	3-7
Nissan	Nissan Almera GTi	(Norway) Marcus Foss	(United Kingdom) Glenn Patterson	1-6
Nissan	Nissan Micra	(United Kingdom) Shelley Taunt	(United Kingdom) Bob Stokoe	1–2, 4, 6–7
Nissan	Nissan Micra	(United Kingdom) Shelley Taunt	(United Kingdom) Andrew Garrett	3
Opel	Opel Corsa S1000	(United Kingdom) Kris Meeke	(United Kingdom) Chris Patterson	1–3, 6
Opel	Opel Corsa S1000	(United Kingdom) Kris Meeke	(United Kingdom) David Senior	5
Peugeot	Peugeot 205 GTI	(United Kingdom) Ellya Gold	(United Kingdom) Kevin Plunkett	2
Peugeot	Peugeot 206 GT	(United Kingdom) Ellya Gold	(United Kingdom) Kevin Plunkett	1
Peugeot	Peugeot 206 GT	(United Kingdom) Ellya Gold	(United Kingdom) Phil Mills	4
Peugeot	Peugeot 206 GT	(United Kingdom) Ellya Gold	(United Kingdom) Simon Mills	7
Peugeot	Peugeot 206 GTI	(United Kingdom) Ellya Gold	(United Kingdom) Kevin Plunkett	3
Peugeot	Peugeot 206 S1600	(United Kingdom) Garry Jennings	(United Kingdom) Gordon Noble	All
Peugeot	Peugeot 206 XS	(Republic of Ireland) Shaun Gallagher	(United Kingdom) Richard Pashley	5-6
Peugeot	Peugeot 206 XS	(United Kingdom) Jack Ingleby	(United Kingdom) Grania Ingleby	5-6
Peugeot	Peugeot 206 XS	(Republic of Ireland) Dessie Keenan	(Republic of Ireland) Enda Sherry	5
Peugeot	Peugeot 206 XS	(Republic of Ireland) Gareth MacHale	(Republic of Ireland) Elva Roe	5
Peugeot	Peugeot 206 XS	(Republic of Ireland) Gareth MacHale	(United Kingdom) Clive Jenkins	6-7
Peugeot	Peugeot 206 XS	(Greece) Yorgo Philippedes	(United Kingdom) Marshall Clarke	5
Peugeot	Peugeot 206 XS	(Greece) Yorgo Philippedes	(United Kingdom) Bryan Hull	6
Peugeot	Peugeot 206 XS	(Spain) Joan Roca	(Spain) Jordi Barrabés	5-6
Peugeot	Peugeot 206 XS	(Spain) Joan Roca	(Spain) Daniel Guirro	7
Proton	Proton Satria S1600	(Sweden) Mats Andersson	(United Kingdom) Claire Mole	1
Proton	Proton Satria S1600	(United Kingdom) Stuart Jones	(United Kingdom) Richard Edwards	7
Renault	Renault Clio S1600	(United Kingdom) Mark Higgins	(United Kingdom) Bryan Thomas	1
SEAT	SEAT Ibiza GTi 16V	(United Kingdom) Kate Heath	(United Kingdom) Paul Heath	All
Subaru	Subaru Impreza S4 WRC '98	(United Kingdom) Eugene Donnelly	(Republic of Ireland) Paul Kiely	3
Subaru	Subaru Impreza S5 WRC '99	(Finland) Tapio Laukkanen	(Finland) Miikka Anttila	1-3
Subaru	Subaru Impreza S5 WRC '99	(Finland) Tapio Laukkanen	(Finland) Ilkka Riipinen	4-6
Subaru	Subaru Impreza S6 WRC '00	(United Kingdom) Peadar Hurson	(United Kingdom) Ian Porter	3, 5
Subaru	Subaru Impreza S7 WRC '01	(Republic of Ireland) Austin MacHale	(Republic of Ireland) Brian Murphy	All
Subaru	Subaru Impreza S7 WRC '01	(United Kingdom) Andrew Nesbitt	(Republic of Ireland) James O'Brien	3, 5
Subaru	Subaru Impreza S7 WRC '01	(Republic of Ireland) Eamonn Boland	(Republic of Ireland) Damien Morrissey	3, 5
Subaru	Subaru Impreza S8 WRC '02	(Republic of Ireland) Eamonn Boland	(United Kingdom) Francis Regan	4
Subaru	Subaru Impreza S8 WRC '02	(United Kingdom) Derek McGarrity	(Republic of Ireland) Dermot O'Gorman	3-5
Subaru	Subaru Impreza STi	(Sweden) Jennie-Lee Hermansson	(United Kingdom) Howard Davies	6
Subaru	Subaru Impreza 555	(United Kingdom) Ryan Champion	(United Kingdom) Cliff Simmons	7
Toyota	Toyota Corolla WRC	(United Kingdom) Jonny Milner	(United Kingdom) Nicky Beech	1-6

== Calendar ==
- Pirelli International Rally – 25–26 April
- RSAC Scottish Rally – 13–15 June
- Jim Clark Memorial Rally – 5–6 July
- Manx International Rally – 31 July–2 August
- The AnswerCall Direct International Ulster Rally – 5–6 September
- Trackrod Rally Yorkshire – 27–28 September
- Tempest South of England Rally – 25–26 October
