= 1999 British Rally Championship =

The 1999 British Rally Championship was a rallying championship season for rally cars conforming to F2 and Group N Regulations, with only the F2 teams and drivers eligible to win the overall title. The championship was won by Finland's Tapio Laukkanen ahead of former champion Gwyndaf Evans and 1998 Champion Martin Rowe. The Manufacturers title was won by Renault.

Calendar

Round	Event	Date
1	Vauxhall Rally of Wales	13-14 March
2	Pirelli International Rally	24-25 April
3	Scottish Rally	11-12 June
4	Jim Clark Memorial Rally	2-4 July
5	Stena Line Ulster Rally	30-31 July
6	Manx International Rally	9-12 September

Driver Changes

Alister McRae left Volkswagen to join Hyundai in the World Rally Championship

McRae was replaced by Mark Higgins after Nissan's withdrawal from Rallying

Ford withdrew their works team from the championship

Future WRC Star Toni Gardemeister joined SEAT's BRC Team

Raimund Baumschlager joined the Volkswagen Team

Robbie Head left the series

Leading Entries

Entrant	Manufacturer	Car	No	Driver	Rounds
Renault Elf Dealer Rallying (Auto-Meca)	Renault	Megane Maxi Kit Car	1	Martin Rowe	All
Renault Elf Dealer Rallying (Auto-Meca)	Renault	Megane Maxi Kit Car	4	Tapio Laukkanen	All
SEAT Cupra Sport	SEAT	Ibiza Kit Car Evo 2	2	Gwyndaf Evans	All
SEAT Cupra Sport	SEAT	Ibiza Kit Car Evo 2	7	Barbara Armstrong	All
SEAT Cupra Sport	SEAT	Ibiza Kit Car Evo 2	10	Toni Gardemeister	All
SEAT Cupra Sport	SEAT	Ibiza Kit Car Evo 2	11	Mike Brown	All
Shell Motorsport Norway	SEAT	Ibiza Kit Car Evo 2	26	Birger Gundersson	1
Volkswagen Motorsport UK (SBG Sport)	Volkswagen	Golf GTI Kit Car	3	Mark Higgins	All
Volkswagen Motorsport UK (SBG Sport)	Volkswagen	Golf GTI Kit Car	8	Raimund Baumschlager	All
Volkswagen Motorsport UK (SBG Sport)	Volkswagen	Golf TDI Kit Car	42	Neil Simpson	All
Vauxhall Motorsport (RML)	Vauxhall	Astra Kit Car	5	Jarmo Kytölehto	All
Vauxhall Motorsport (RML)	Vauxhall	Astra Kit Car	6	Neil Wearden	All
Peugeot Sport UK	Peugeot	106 Maxi Kit Car	14	Justin Dale	All
Proton Motorsports (Harry Hockly)	Proton	Satria	15	Mats Andersson	All
Proton Motorsports (Harry Hockly)	Proton	Satria	16	Jenny Davies	1-3
Proton Motorsports (Harry Hockly)	Proton	Satria	16	Geoff Jones	5-6
Boland Motorsport	Ford	Escort Kit Car	22	Stuart Egglestone	All
Boland Motorsport	Ford	Escort Kit Car	26	Julian Porter	All
Barretts Motorsport	Subaru	Impreza WRX	18	David Higgins	All
Duncan Mcmath	Toyota	Celica GT-Four	20	Jonny Milner	All
Dom Buckley Motorsport	Mitsubishi	Lancer Evolution 5	19	Dom Buckley	1-2
Dom Buckley Motorsport	Mitsubishi	Lancer Evolution 5	19	Neil Buckley	3-4
Jeremy Easson	Mitsubishi	Lancer Evolution 5	29	Jeremy Easson	All
Nik Elsmore	Nissan	Sunny GTI	37	Nik Elsmore	All
Richard Tuthill	Subaru	Impreza WRX	24	Richard Tuthill	All
Daniel Dunbabin	Skoda	Felicia	83	Daniel Dunbabin	All
Polar Motorsport	Opel	Corsa Maxi Kit Car	27	Markko Ipatti	All
Proton Motorsports (Harry Hockly)	Proton	Satria	16	Martin Meadows	4
Ford Motor Company	Ford	Puma	62	Ben Briant	All
Team Mitsubishi Ralliart Finland	Mitsubishi	Lancer Evolution 5	33	Juuso Pykalisto	All

Drivers Championship

Pos	Entrant	R1	R2	R3	R4	R5	R6	Pts
1	Tapio Laukkanen	2nd	1st	1st	1st	5th	DNF	144
2	Gwyndaf Evans	DNF	4th	4th	3rd	2nd	3rd	122
3	Martin Rowe	1st	DNF	2nd	2nd	DNF	1st	120
4	Raimund Baumschlager	7th	6th	5th	8th	DNF	2nd	96
5	Justin Dale	9th	9th	7th	9th	4th	4th	95
6	Mark Higgins	3rd	3rd	DNF	6th	3rd	DNF	93
7	Jarmo Kytölehto	4th	5th	DNF	7th	DNF	DNF	
	Toni Gardemeister	DNF	2nd	3rd	4th	DNF	DNF	
	Neil Wearden	5th	10th	DNF	5th	1st	DNF	

Manufacturers Championship

Pos	Entrant	R1	R2	R3	R4	R5	R6	Pts
1	Renault	16	16	16	16	6	16	86
2	Volkswagen	12	9	9	7	9	12	58
3	SEAT	0	12	12	12	12	9	57
4	Vauxhall	9	7	0	9	16	0	41
5	Peugeot	7	6	7	6	7	7	40
6	Proton	0	5	6	5	5	5	26
