= 2004 British Rally Championship =

Seasons
- ← 2003 2005 →

The 2004 British Rally Championship season was the 46th season of the British Rally Championship. The season consisted of eight rounds and began on 23 April, with the Pirelli International Rally in the north east of England. The season ended on 6 November, at the Tempest South of England Rally.

The title was won by Manxman David Higgins.

== Entry list ==
Car	Driver	Rounds
Fiat Punto S1600	(San Marino) Alessandro Broccoli	1
Ford Focus RS WRC '02	(United Kingdom) Steve Perez	1–4, 6–7
Ford Focus RS WRC '02	(United Kingdom) Malcolm Wilson	All
Ford Focus RS WRC '03	(Republic of Ireland) Austin MacHale	2–8
Hyundai Accent WRC	(United Kingdom) David Higgins	1–4, 6–8
Mitsubishi Lancer Evo VIII	(United Kingdom) Sebastian Ling	All
Škoda Octavia WRC	(United Kingdom) Mark Higgins	5
Subaru Impreza STi	(United Kingdom) Dorian Rees	All
Subaru Impreza STi	(United Kingdom) Lorna Smith	All
Subaru Impreza S8 WRC '02	(United Kingdom) Jonny Milner	All
Suzuki Ignis S1600	(United Kingdom) Guy Wilks	1–6, 8
Toyota Corolla WRC	(Republic of Ireland) Eugene Donnelly	4–6

== Calendar ==
- Pirelli International Rally – 23–24 April
- International Rally of Wales - 15–16 May
- RSAC Scottish Rally – 4–6 June
- Jim Clark Memorial Rally – 2–3 July
- Manx International Rally – 29–31 July
- The AnswerCall Direct International Ulster Rally – 3–4 September
- Trackrod Rally Yorkshire – 2–3 October
- Tempest South of England Rally – 5–6 November
