= 1998 British Rally Championship =

The 1998 Mobil 1 British Rally Championship was won by Manxman Martin Rowe in the Renault Megane Maxi Kit Car ahead of veteran Welsh driver Gwyndaf Evans in the SEAT Ibiza Kit Car and Alister McRae in The Volkswagen Golf Kit Car. Reigning champion Mark Higgins had a very disappointing season in the new Nissan Almera Kit Car. The ladies' cup was won by SEAT driver Barbara Armstrong ahead of Ford's Stephanie Simmonite. The manufacturers' championship was won by Renault.

Driver Changes

1996 Champion Gwyndaf Evans moved from Ford to SEAT

Robbie Head was replaced at Renault by Tapio Laukkanen who had moved from Volkswagen

Head in turn joined SEAT

Vauxhall returned to the series with the Astra Kit Car with Jarmo Kytolehto at the wheel

Harri Rovanpera did not compete in The British Championship this season to concentrate on his WRC Commitments with SEAT

Calendar

Round	Event	Date
Round 1	Vauxhall Rally of Wales	19–21 March
Round 2/3	Pirelli International Rally	24–26 April
Round 4/5	RSAC Scottish Rally	4–6 June
Round 6	Stena Line Ulster Rally	30 July – 1 August
Round 7	Manx International Rally	10–12 September

== Teams and Drivers ==
Team	Manufacturer	Car	No	Driver	Rounds
Nissan Motorsports Europe	Nissan	Almera Kit Car	1	Mark Higgins	7
Renault Dealer Rallying Association	Renault	Megane Kit Car	2	Martin Rowe	All
Renault Dealer Rallying Association	Renault	Megane Kit Car	6	Tapio Laukkanen	All
SEAT Cupra Sport	SEAT	Ibiza Kit Car	4	Gwyndaf Evans	All
SEAT Cupra Sport	SEAT	Ibiza Kit Car	5	Robbie Head	7
SEAT Cupra Sport	SEAT	Ibiza Kit Car	17	Barbara Armstrong	All
Volkswagen Motorsport UK (SBG Sport)	Volkswagen	Golf GTI Kit Car	3	Alister McRae	All
Volkswagen Motorsport UK (SBG Sport)	Volkswagen	Golf GTI Kit Car	5	Raimund Baumschlager	6
Ford Motor Company	Ford	Escort Maxi Kit Car	11	Lars-Goran Andersson	4–5
Vauxhall Motorsport (RML)	Vauxhall	Astra Kit Car	10	Jarmo Kytolehto	All
Polar Motorsport	Mitsubishi	Lancer Evolution 4	24	Marko Ipatti	All
Ford Motorsport (Boland Motorsport)	Ford	Escort RS2000	8	Stephanie Simmonite	All
Ford Motorsport (Boland Motorsport)	Ford	Escort RS2000	12	Liam O'Callaghan	6–7
Proton Motorsport (Harry Hockly Motorsport)	Proton	Satria	14	Mats Andersson	All
Proton Motorsport (Harry Hockly Motorsport)	Proton	Satria	20	Jenny Davies	All
SW Motorsport	Citroen	Saxo Kit Car	19	Julian Reynolds	6
David Mann	Proton	Persona	21	David Mann	All
Peugeot Sport UK	Peugeot	106 GTI	7	Justin Dale	All
Asquith Motorsport	Honda	Civic v-tec	31	Neil Wearden	All

'Drivers Championship'

Pos	Driver	R1	R2	R3	R4	R5	R6	R7	Pts
1	Martin Rowe	1st	1st	4th	3rd	1st	2nd	1st	164
2	Gwyndaf Evans	3rd	2nd	1st	1st	4th	1st	DNF	153
3	Alister McRae	DNF	6th	2nd	2nd	3rd	3rd	5th	133
4	Tapio Laukkanen	DNF	4th	3rd	9th	2nd	6th	2nd	127
5	Neil Wearden	2nd	8th	5th	5th	6th	8th	DNF	102
6	Jarmo Kytolehto	DNF	3rd	DNF	4th	5th	DNF	3rd	96
7	Barbara Armstrong	5th	11th	8th	DNF	12th	14th	6th	74
8	Stephanie Simmonite	4th	14th	7th	DNF	11th	DNF	7th	73

Manufacturers Championship

Pos	Entrant	R1	R2	R3	R4	R5	R6	R7	R8	Pts
1	Renault	26.5	32	32	25	25	32	32	36	190.5
2	SEAT	32	28	28	32	32	25	36	0	188.0
3	Volkswagen	26.5	0	22	28	28	28	29	26	165.5
4	Ford	22	25	18	22	20	20	26	29	144.0
5	Vauxhall	18	20	25	20	22	22	20	32	141.0
6	Peugeot	20	22	20	0	18	16	23	0	119.0
7	Proton	16	0	0	18	0	18	0	0	52.0

There was an earlier round before the Vauxhall Rally of Wales, the Silverstone RallySprint which only counted for manufacturers points
