= 2021 British Rally Championship =

The British Rally Championship is a rallying series run over the course of a year, that comprises seven tarmac and gravel surface events. 2021 is the 63rd season of the series. The season began at Oulton Park on 31 May and concluded on 20 November in Northern Ireland.

== 2021 calendar ==
For season 2021 there was due to be seven events held on both gravel and tarmac surfaces however due to the ongoing COVID-19 pandemic, a number of events were cancelled. The 2021 reserve event, the Mull Rally was added to the series making a six round championship. On 24 March it was announced by the BRC that The Neil Howard Stages, taking place in May would be added as the series opener.

Round	Dates	Event	Rally HQ	Surface	Website
1	31 May	Neil Howard Stages	Oulton Park	Tarmac	(website)
2	10 July	Nicky Grist Stages Rally	Builth Wells	Gravel	(website)
3	14 Aug	Grampian Forest Rally	Banchory	Gravel	(website)
4	24/25 September	Trackrod Rally Yorkshire	Scarborough	Gravel	(website)
5	8/9 October	Mull Rally	Isle of Mull	Tarmac	(website)
6	30 October	Cambrian Rally	Llandudno	Gravel	(website)
7	20 November	Ulster Rally	Newry	Tarmac	(website)
Cancelled due to the COVID-19 pandemic
	Original Date	Event	Rally HQ	Surface	Website
-	2/3 Apr	Circuit of Ireland Rally	Belfast	Tarmac	(website)
-	24/25 April	Rally Tendring & Clacton	Clacton	Tarmac	(website)
-	28/29 May	Jim Clark Rally	Duns	Tarmac	(website)

== Event results ==
Podium places and information on each event.

Round	Rally name	Podium finishers				Statistics			
Round	Rally name	Rank	Driver	Car	Time	Stages	Length - km	Starters	Finishers
1	Neil Howard Stages, England; 31 May	1	(Republic of Ireland) Sam Moffett	Ford Fiesta Rally2	49:32	8	80.86	143	119
1	Neil Howard Stages, England; 31 May	2	(United Kingdom) Rhys Yates	Ford Fiesta Rally2	49:33	8	80.86	143	119
1	Neil Howard Stages, England; 31 May	3	(United Kingdom) Osian Pryce	Volkswagen Polo GTI R5	49:40	8	80.86	143	119
2	Nicky Grist Stages, Wales; 10 July	1	(United Kingdom) Matt Edwards	Volkswagen Polo GTI R5	42:30	8	70.86	170	128
2	Nicky Grist Stages, Wales; 10 July	2	(United Kingdom) Tom Cave	Ford Fiesta Rally2	42:35	8	70.86	170	128
2	Nicky Grist Stages, Wales; 10 July	3	(United Kingdom) Osian Pryce	Volkswagen Polo GTI R5	42:42	8	70.86	170	128
3	Grampian Forest Rally, Scotland; 14 August	1	(United Kingdom) Matthew Wilson	Ford Fiesta Rally2	38:49	6	69.94	115	90
3	Grampian Forest Rally, Scotland; 14 August	2	(United Kingdom) Osian Pryce	Volkswagen Polo GTI R5	39:09	6	69.94	115	90
3	Grampian Forest Rally, Scotland; 14 August	3	(United Kingdom) Rhys Yates	Ford Fiesta Rally2	39:27	6	69.94	115	90
4	Trackrod Rally, England; 24-25 September	1	(United Kingdom) Matt Edwards	Volkswagen Polo GTI R5	53:17.0	6	90.47	86	64
4	Trackrod Rally, England; 24-25 September	2	(United Kingdom) Osian Pryce	Volkswagen Polo GTI R5	53:49.8	6	90.47	86	64
4	Trackrod Rally, England; 24-25 September	3	(United Kingdom) Matthew Wilson	Ford Fiesta Rally2	53:50.6	6	90.47	86	64
5	Mull Rally, Scotland; 8-10 October	1	(United Kingdom) Osian Pryce	Volkswagen Polo GTI R5	2:21:17.6	17	238.54	151	101
5	Mull Rally, Scotland; 8-10 October	2	(United Kingdom) Matt Edwards	Volkswagen Polo GTI R5	2:28:44.6	17	238.54	151	101
5	Mull Rally, Scotland; 8-10 October	3	(Republic of Ireland) William Creighton	Ford Fiesta Rally4	2:30:48.3	17	238.54	151	101
6	Cambrian Rally, Wales; 30 October	1	(United Kingdom) Osian Pryce	Volkswagen Polo GTI R5	45:23.4	7	71.52	136	106
6	Cambrian Rally, Wales; 30 October	2	(United Kingdom) Seb Perez	Ford Fiesta Rally2	47:43.3	7	71.52	136	106
6	Cambrian Rally, Wales; 30 October	3	(United Kingdom) Matt Edwards	Volkswagen Polo GTI R5	49:32.0	7	71.52	136	106
7	Ulster Rally, Northern Ireland; 20 November	1	(United Kingdom) Matt Edwards	Volkswagen Polo GTI R5	1:28:24.4	9	150.93	100	60
7	Ulster Rally, Northern Ireland; 20 November	2	(United Kingdom) Jonathan Greer	Citroën C3 R5	1:30:56.2	9	150.93	100	60
7	Ulster Rally, Northern Ireland; 20 November	3	(Republic of Ireland) Callum Devine	Ford Fiesta Rally2	1:31:11.4	9	150.93	100	60

== 2021 British Rally Championship for Drivers ==
=== Scoring system ===
Points are awarded as follows: 25, 18, 15, 12, 10, 8, 6, 4, 2, 1. Drivers may nominate one event as their 'joker', on which they will score additional points: 5, 4, 3, 2, 1. Competitors five best scores will count towards their championship total.

Position	1st	2nd	3rd	4th	5th	6th	7th	8th	9th	10th
Points	25	18	15	12	10	8	6	4	2	1
Joker Points	5	4	3	2	1					

Pos	Co-Driver	NHS	NGS	GRA	TRA	MUL	CAM	ULS	Points
1	Matt Edwards	12	25	0	25	18	18*	25	119
2	Osian Pryce	15	15	18	18	30*	25	DNF	106
3	Matthew Wilson	DNP	10	25	18*	DNP	DNF	DNP	53
4	Rhys Yates	22 *	12	15	4	DNP	DNS	DNP	53
5	Sam Moffett	25	8	4	DNP	DNP	DNP	12	49
Pos	Co-Driver	NHS	NGS	GRA	TRA	MUL	CAM	ULS	Pts

Key
Colour	Result
Gold	Winner
Silver	2nd place
Bronze	3rd place
Green	Non-podium finish
Purple	Did not finish (Ret)
Black	Disqualified (DSQ)
Black	Excluded (EXC)
White	Did not start (DNS)
*	Joker played
