= Per Carlsson =

Swedish handball player (born 1960)

Per Carlsson (born 16 December 1960 in Grums, Sweden) is a Swedish former handball player who competed in the 1988 Summer Olympics.
