= British Rally Championship =

Rallying series based in the United Kingdom

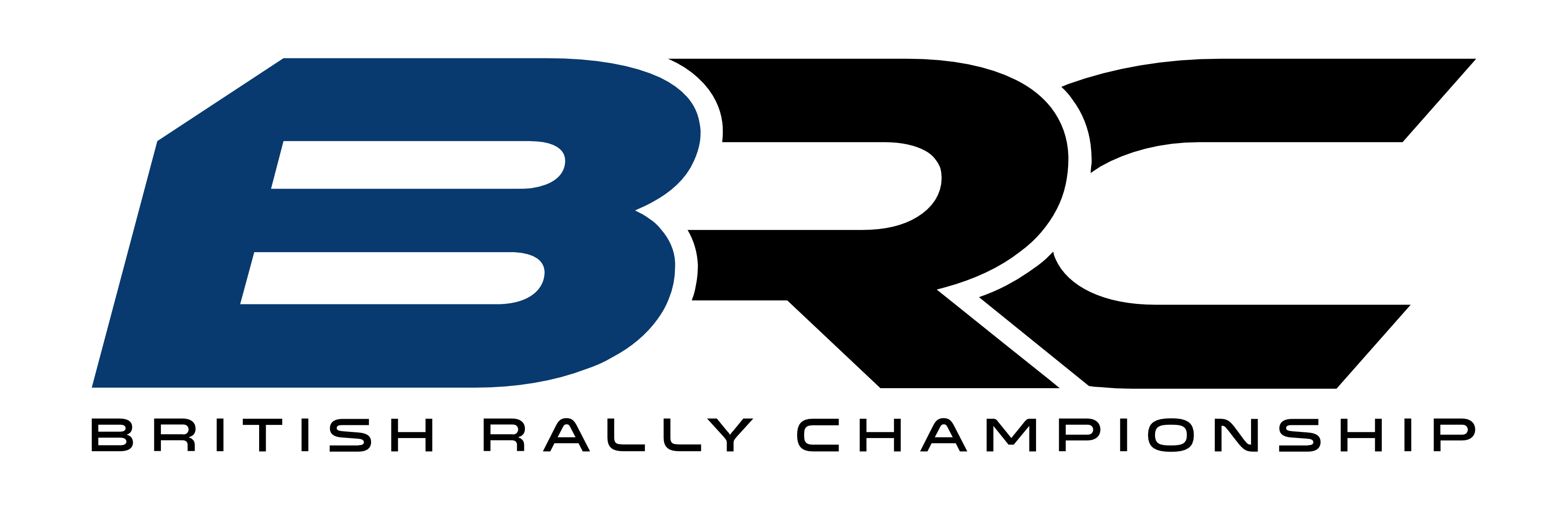
- Logo from 2024
- Country: United Kingdom
- Inaugural season: 1958
- Drivers: Various
- Drivers' champion: (United Kingdom) Osian Pryce
- Official website: britishrallychampionship.co.uk/

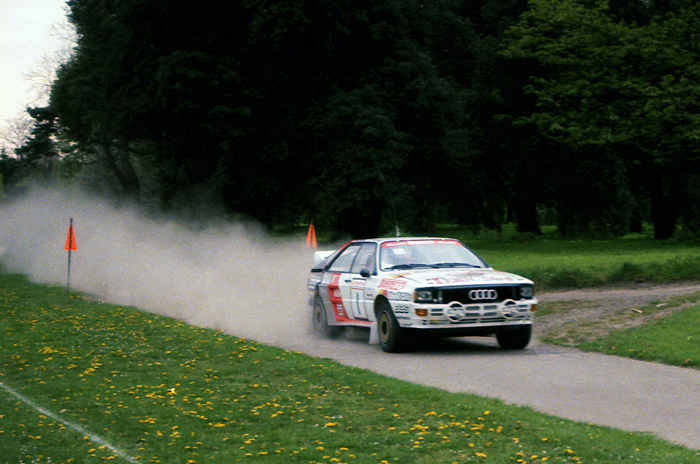
Michèle Mouton drives an Audi Quattro A2 at the 1985 Welsh Rally.

The British Rally Championship (BRC) is a rallying series based in the United Kingdom. The first championship was run in 1958 and it has been licensed by the Motor Sports Association (MSA) since 1999. MSA has opted not to run the series in 2015, instead giving its promotion to its own subsidiary, International Motor Sport (IMS) for 2016. Motorsport UK have promoted the BRC and have done since IMS was absorbed into Motorsport UK in 2019.

== Champions ==
=== British Rally Championship ===
Season	Champion	Co-Driver	Car
2026	(United Kingdom) Osian Pryce	(United Kingdom) James Morgan	Toyota GR Yaris Rally2
2025	(Republic of Ireland) William Creighton	(Republic of Ireland) Liam Regan	Toyota GR Yaris Rally2
2024	(United Kingdom) Chris Ingram	(United States) Alex Kihurani	Toyota GR Yaris Rally2
2023	(France) Adrien Fourmaux	(France) Alexandre Coria	Ford Fiesta Rally2
2022	(United Kingdom) Osian Pryce	(Republic of Ireland) Noel O’Sullivan	Volkswagen Polo GTI R5
2021	(United Kingdom) Matt Edwards	(United Kingdom) Darren Garrod	Volkswagen Polo GTI R5
2020	Cancelled due to COVID-19 pandemic		
2019	(United Kingdom) Matt Edwards	(United Kingdom) Patrick Walsh	Ford Fiesta R5
2018	(United Kingdom) Matt Edwards	(United Kingdom) Darren Garrod	Ford Fiesta R5
2017	(Republic of Ireland) Keith Cronin	(Republic of Ireland) Mikie Galvin	Ford Fiesta R5
2016	(United Kingdom) Elfyn Evans	(United Kingdom) Craig Parry	Ford Fiesta R5
2015	Cancelled due to organisational issues		
2014	(Republic of Ireland) Daniel McKenna	(Republic of Ireland) Arthur Kierans	Citroen DS3 R3T
2013	(Finland) Jukka Korhonen	(Finland) Marko Salminen	Citroen DS3 R3T
2012	(Republic of Ireland) Keith Cronin	(United Kingdom) Marshall Clarke	Citroen DS3 R3T
2011	(United Kingdom) David Bogie	(United Kingdom) Kevin Rae	Mitsubishi Lancer Evo IX R4
2010	(Republic of Ireland) Keith Cronin	(United Kingdom) Barry McNulty	Subaru Impreza STi N15
2009	(Republic of Ireland) Keith Cronin	(Republic of Ireland) Greg Shinnors	Mitsubishi Lancer Evo IX R4
2008	(United Kingdom) Guy Wilks	(Republic of Ireland) Rory Kennedy*	Mitsubishi Lancer Evo IX R4
2007	(United Kingdom) Guy Wilks	(United Kingdom) Phil Pugh	Mitsubishi Lancer Evo IX R4
2006	(United Kingdom) Mark Higgins	(Republic of Ireland) Rory Kennedy	Subaru Impreza STI N12 R4
2005	(United Kingdom) Mark Higgins	(United Kingdom) Bryan Thomas	Ford Focus RS WRC 02
2004	(United Kingdom) David Higgins	(Republic of Ireland) Brian Murphy*	Hyundai Accent WRC Evo 3
2003	(United Kingdom) Jonny Milner	(United Kingdom) Nicky Beech	Toyota Corolla WRC
2002	(United Kingdom) Jonny Milner	(United Kingdom) Nicky Beech	Toyota Corolla WRC
2001	Cancelled due to foot-and-mouth crisis		
2000	(Finland) Marko Ipatti	(United Kingdom) Bryan Thomas*	Mitsubishi Lancer Evolution VI N4
1999	(Finland) Tapio Laukkanen	(Finland) Kaj Lindström	Renault Maxi Mégane

^{*In 2000, Ipatti used both Kari Kajala and Teppo Leino as co-drivers during the season. Hence, runner-up Mark Higgins' co-driver Bryan Thomas was awarded the co-drivers title. Two similar situations occurred in 2004 & 2008. In 2004 David Higgins used Chris Wood, Craig Thorley & Daniel Barritt as co-drivers during the season. Hence, runner-up Austin MacHale' co-driver Brian Murphy was awarded the co-drivers title. In 2008, Wilks used both Phil Pugh and David Moynihan as co-drivers during the season. Again, runner-up Mark Higgins' co-driver Rory Kennedy was awarded the co-drivers title.}

RACMSA British Rally Championship

Season	Champion	Co-Driver	Car
1998	(United Kingdom) Martin Rowe	(United Kingdom) Derek Ringer	Renault Mégane Maxi
1997	(United Kingdom) Mark Higgins	(United Kingdom) Phil Mills	Nissan Sunny GTi
1996	(United Kingdom) Gwyndaf Evans	(United Kingdom) Howard Davies	Ford Escort RS2000
1995	(United Kingdom) Alister McRae	(United Kingdom) David Senior	Nissan Sunny GTi
1994	(United Kingdom) Malcolm Wilson	(United Kingdom) Bryan Thomas	Ford Escort RS Cosworth
1993	(United Kingdom) Richard Burns	(United Kingdom) Robert Reid	Subaru Legacy RS
1992	(United Kingdom) Colin McRae	(United Kingdom) Derek Ringer	Subaru Legacy RS
1991	(United Kingdom) Colin McRae	(United Kingdom) Derek Ringer	Subaru Legacy RS
1990	(United Kingdom) David Llewellin	(United Kingdom) Phil Short	Toyota Celica GT-Four ST165

RACMSA British Open Rally Championship

Season	Champion	Co-Driver	Car
1989	(United Kingdom) David Llewellin	(United Kingdom) Phil Short	Toyota Celica GT-Four ST165
1988	(United Kingdom) Jimmy McRae	(United Kingdom) Rob Arthur	Ford Sierra RS Cosworth
1987	(United Kingdom) Jimmy McRae	(United Kingdom) Ian Grindrod	Ford Sierra RS Cosworth
1986	(United Kingdom) Mark Lovell	(United Kingdom) Roger Freeman	Ford RS200
1985	(United Kingdom) Russell Brookes	(United Kingdom) Mike Broad	Opel Manta 400
1984	(United Kingdom) Jimmy McRae	(United Kingdom) Mike Nicholson	Opel Manta 400
1983	(Sweden) Stig Blomqvist	(Sweden) Björn Cederberg	Audi Quattro A2
1982	(United Kingdom) Jimmy McRae	(United Kingdom) Ian Grindrod	Opel Ascona 400
1981	(United Kingdom) Jimmy McRae	(United Kingdom) Ian Grindrod	Opel Ascona 400
1980	(Finland) Ari Vatanen	(United Kingdom) David Richards	Ford Escort RS1800
1979	(Finland) Pentti Airikkala	(Finland) Risto Virtanen	Vauxhall Chevette HSR
1978	(Finland) Hannu Mikkola	(Sweden) Arne Hertz	Ford Escort RS1800

RAC British Rally Championship

Season	Champion	Co-Driver	Car
1977	(United Kingdom) Russell Brookes	(United Kingdom) John Brown	Ford Escort RS1800
1976	(Finland) Ari Vatanen	(United Kingdom) Peter Bryant	Ford Escort RS1800
1975	(United Kingdom) Roger Clark	(United Kingdom) Jim Porter	Ford Escort RS1800
1974	(Republic of Ireland) Billy Coleman	(Republic of Ireland) Dan O'Sullivan	Ford Escort RS1600
1973	(United Kingdom) Roger Clark	(United Kingdom) Jim Porter	Ford Escort RS1600
1972	(United Kingdom) Roger Clark	(United Kingdom) Jim Porter	Ford Escort RS1600
1971	(United Kingdom) Chris Sclater	(United Kingdom) Martin Holmes	Ford Escort RS1600
1970	(United Kingdom) Will Sparrow	Nigel Raeburn	Mini Cooper S 1275
1969	(United Kingdom) John Bloxham	(United Kingdom) Richard Harper	Lancia Fulvia HF/Ford Escort TC
1968	(United Kingdom) Colin Malkin	(United Kingdom) John Brown	Hillman Rallye Imp
1967	(United Kingdom) Jim Bullough	(United Kingdom) Don Barrow	Ford Lotus Cortina
1966	(United Kingdom) Roy Fidler	Alan Taylor	Triumph 2000
1965	(United Kingdom) Roger Clark	(United Kingdom) Jim Porter	Ford Cortina
1964	(United Kingdom) Eric Jackson	(United Kingdom) Ken Joseph	Ford Cortina GT
1963	(United Kingdom) Tony Fisher	Brian Melia	Mini Cooper
1962	(United Kingdom) Tony Fisher	Brian Melia	Mini Cooper
1961	(United Kingdom) Bill Bengry	David Skeffington	Volkswagen 1500
1960	(United Kingdom) Bill Bengry	David Skeffington	Volkswagen 1200
1959	(United Kingdom) John Sprinzel	Stuart Turner	Austin-Healey Sprite
1958	Ron Gouldbourn	Stuart Turner	Triumph TR3A

== Multiple wins by individual ==
	Name	Titles	Winning years
(United Kingdom)	Jimmy McRae	5	1981, 1982, 1984, 1987, 1988
(United Kingdom)	Roger Clark	4	1965, 1972, 1973, 1975
(Republic of Ireland)	Keith Cronin	4	2009, 2010, 2012, 2017
(United Kingdom)	Mark Higgins	3	1997, 2005, 2006
(United Kingdom)	Matt Edwards	3	2018, 2019, 2021
(United Kingdom)	Bill Bengry	2	1960, 1961
(United Kingdom)	Tony Fisher	2	1962, 1963
(United Kingdom)	Russell Brookes	2	1977, 1985
(Finland)	Ari Vatanen	2	1976, 1980
(United Kingdom)	David Llewellin	2	1989, 1990
(United Kingdom)	Colin McRae	2	1991, 1992
(United Kingdom)	Johnny Milner	2	2002, 2003
(United Kingdom)	Guy Wilks	2	2007, 2008
(United Kingdom)	Osian Pryce	2	2022, 2026

== Multiple wins by car manufacturer ==
	Name	Titles	Winning years
(United States)	Ford	23	1964, 1965, 1967, 1971, 1972, 1973, 1974, 1975, 1976, 1977, 1978, 1980, 1986, 1987, 1988, 1994, 1996, 2005, 2016, 2017, 2018, 2019, 2023
(Japan)	Toyota	8	1983, 1989, 1990, 2002, 2003, 2024, 2025, 2026
(Japan)	Subaru	5	1991, 1992, 1993, 2006, 2010
(Japan)	Mitsubishi Motors	5	2000, 2007, 2008, 2009, 2011
(United Kingdom)	British Motor Corporation	4	1959, 1962, 1963, 1970
(Germany)	Volkswagen	4	1960, 1961, 2021, 2022
(Germany)	Opel	4	1981, 1982, 1984, 1985
(France)	Citroën	3	2012, 2013, 2014
(Japan)	Nissan	2	1995, 1997
(France)	Renault	2	1998, 1999

== See also ==
- World Rally Championship
- Scottish Rally Championship
