= Russell Brookes =

British rally driver (1945–2019)

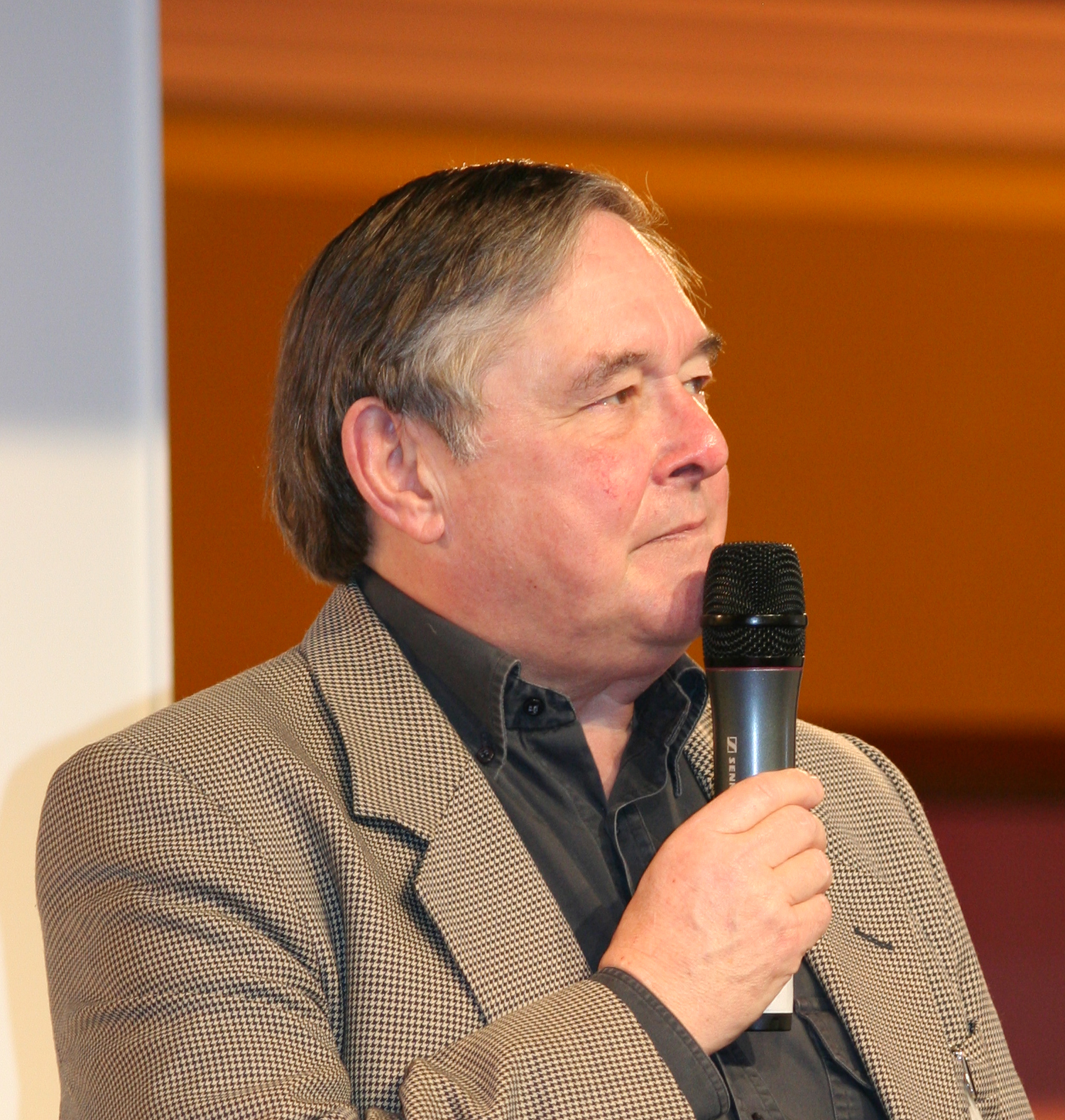
- Brookes at the 2009 Autosport International.

Personal information
- Nationality: (United Kingdom) British
- Born: 16 August 1945; Redditch, Worcestershire, England, United Kingdom
- Died: 29 October 2019 (aged 74)

World Rally Championship record
- Years active: 1973–1990, 1992, 1994
- Co-driver: (United Kingdom) John Brown (United Kingdom) Martin Holmes (United Kingdom) Derek Tucker (United Kingdom) Paul White (United Kingdom) Peter Bryant (United Kingdom) Mike Broad (Republic of Ireland) Ronan Morgan (United Kingdom) Neil Wilson
- Teams: Ford, Talbot, Vauxhall, Opel, Lancia
- Rallies: 22
- Championships: 0
- Rally wins: 0
- Podiums: 3
- Stage wins: 38
- Total points: 56
- First rally: 1973 RAC Rally
- Last rally: 1994 RAC Rally

Russell Brookes (16 August 1945 – 30 October 2019) was a British rally driver. He won the British Rally Championship with a Ford Escort RS1800 in 1977 and with an Opel Manta 400 in 1985. In 1978, he won the Rally New Zealand, a round of the FIA Cup for Drivers, the predecessor to the World Championship for Drivers. In the World Rally Championship, he finished on the podium of his home event, the RAC Rally, three times in a row from 1977 to 1979.

== Career ==
The only son of a firefighter, Brookes made his competitive debut in club events in 1963. At first he drove a number of privately entered cars including a BMC Mini Cooper. Progress was slow until 1973 without the support of family money in a sport which, at that time, did not permit sponsorship of individual cars. He then came to the attention of the Ford Motor Company Ltd when contesting their Ford Escort Mexico (One Make) championship.

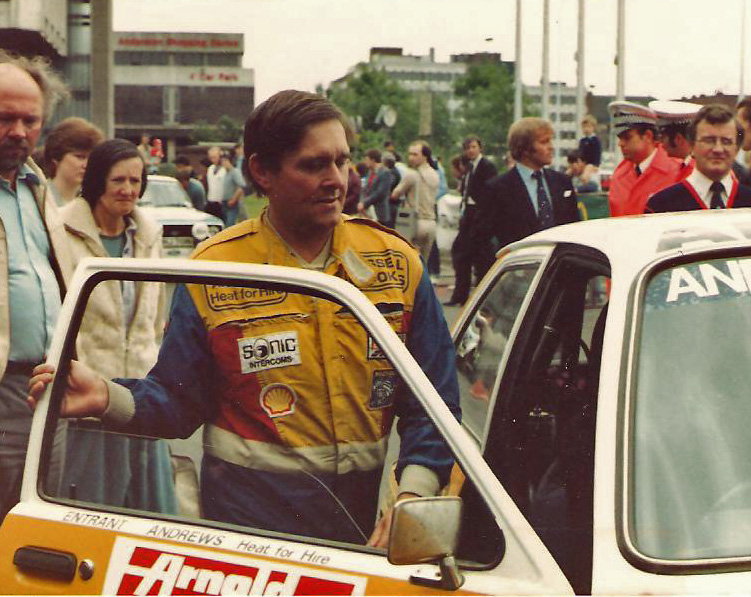
Brookes prior to the 1982 Scottish Rally.

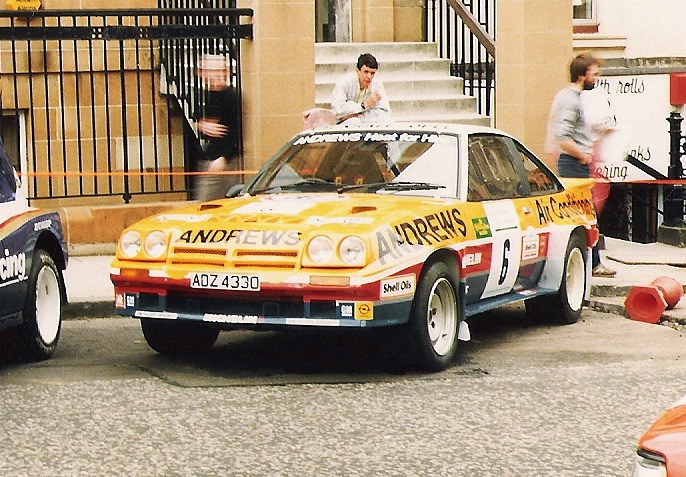
Brookes' Opel Manta 400 lining up before the 1986 Scottish.

In 1974, Brookes started one of the longest running sponsorship deals in motorsport when he signed with Andrews - Heat for Hire (a portable heating and air conditioning company). Their distinctive yellow colour scheme graced nearly all of his cars through to 1991. During this period the sponsors' turnover grew from £1.5m to over £60m making it a benchmark for other sponsorship deals.

In 1976, Brookes was invited to join the Ford 'works' team to drive an Escort RS1800 in the British Rally Championship. At that time the British Championship was highly competitive having eclipsed the World Rally Championship for publicity. Brookes found himself in formidable company not least from within the team, Björn Waldegård, Hannu Mikkola and Ari Vatanen (all world champions), being his team-mates. He won the Open Championship in 1977 and then stayed with Ford until the end of the 1979 World Rally Championship season.

Two years in the Talbot team followed before he joined Vauxhall/Opel dealer team, first in the Chevette HSR then the mighty Group B Opel Manta 400. The two years with the Opel Manta put Brookes head to head with his team mate Jimmy McRae (father of the late world champion Colin McRae). The needle match contest was more about the unofficial title of 'Top British Driver' than the championship itself. McRae won in 1984 and Brookes in 1985.

After a year in the uncompetitive Vauxhall Astra and a one off event in a 'works' Lancia Delta Integrale Brookes rejoined Ford in 1988 for an assault on the British Rally Championship, championing first a Ford Sierra RS Cosworth. Latterly he drove a Ford Sapphire Cosworth 4x4 giving Ford their first international win with the new four wheel drive car. Here he stayed until the end of 1991 when he more or less retired from competitive rallying. Until shortly before his death, he was still making sporadic appearances in various cars on historic rallies and at motorsports events. In September 2008, Brookes took part in the Colin McRae Forest Stages Rally, a round of the Scottish Rally Championship centred in Perth in Scotland. He competed in the event in a historic Ford Escort RS1600. He was one of a number of ex-world and British champions to take part in the event in memory of McRae, who died in 2007.

Brookes died on 30 October 2019, at the age of 74 from injuries sustained from a bicycle accident.

== Racing record ==
=== Complete IMC results ===
Year	Entrant	Car	1	2	3	4	5	6	7	8	9
1970	Russell Brookes	Austin Cooper S	MON	SWE	ITA	KEN	AUT	GRE	GBR; Ret		
1971	Russell Brookes	Austin Mini Cooper S	MON	SWE	ITA	KEN	MAR	AUT	GRE	FRA	GBR; 83
1972	Russell Brookes	BMC Mini Cooper S	MON	SWE	KEN	MAR	GRE	AUT	ITA	USA	GBR; Ret

=== Complete WRC results ===
Year	Entrant	Car	1	2	3	4	5	6	7	8	9	10	11	12	13	14	WDC	Pts
1973	A.T.V. Today	Ford Escort RS1600	MON	SWE	POR	KEN	MOR	GRE	POL	FIN	AUT	ITA	USA	GBR; Ret	FRA		N/A	N/A
1974	Andrews Heat for Hire	Ford Escort RS2000	POR	KEN	FIN	ITA	CAN	USA	GBR; Ret	FRA							N/A	N/A
1975	Birmingham Post / Andrews Heat for Hire	Ford Escort RS1800	MON	SWE	KEN	GRE	MOR	POR	FIN	ITA	FRA	GBR; Ret					N/A	N/A
1976	Andrews Heat for Hire	Ford Escort RS1800	MON	SWE	POR	KEN	GRC	MOR	FIN	ITA	FRA	GBR; Ret					N/A	N/A
1977	Ford Motor Company Ltd	Ford Escort RS1800	MON	SWE	POR	KEN	NZL	GRC	FIN	CAN	ITA	FRA; Ret					N/A	N/A
1977	Andrews Heat for Hire	Ford Escort RS1800											GBR; 3				N/A	N/A
1978	Andrews Heat for Hire	Ford Escort RS1800	MON	SWE	KEN	POR	GRE	FIN	CAN	ITA	CIV	FRA	GBR; 3				N/A	N/A
1979	Andrews Heat for Hire	Ford Escort RS1800	MON	SWE	POR	KEN	GRE	NZL	FIN	CAN	ITA	FRA	GBR; 2	CIV			16th	15
1980	Andrews Heat for Hire	Talbot Sunbeam Lotus	MON	SWE	POR	KEN	GRC	ARG	FIN	NZL	ITA	FRA	GBR; 4	CIV			26th	10
1981	Andrews Heat for Hire	Talbot Sunbeam Lotus	MON	SWE	POR	KEN	FRA	GRC	ARG	BRA	FIN	ITA	CIV	GBR; Ret			NC	0
1982	Andrews Heat for Hire	Vauxhall Chevette 2300 HSR	MON	SWE	POR	KEN	FRA	GRC	NZL	BRA	FIN; 6	ITA	CIV	GBR; 6			15th	12
1983	Andrews Heat for Hire	Vauxhall Chevette 2300 HSR	MON	SWE	POR	KEN	FRA	GRC	NZL	ARG	FIN	ITA	CIV	GBR; 5			21st	8
1984	Andrews Heat for Hire	Opel Manta 400	MON	SWE	POR	KEN	FRA	GRC	NZL	ARG	FIN	ITA	CIV	GBR; 5			24th	8
1985	Opel Euro Team / Andrews Heat for Hire	Opel Manta 400	MON	SWE	POR	KEN	FRA	GRC	NZL	ARG	FIN	ITA	CIV	GBR; 8			51st	3
1986	GM Dealer Sport / Andrews Heat for Hire	Opel Manta 400	MON	SWE	POR	KEN	FRA	GRE	NZL	ARG	FIN	CIV	ITA	GBR; Ret	USA		NC	0
1987	Andrews Heat for Hire	Lancia Delta HF 4WD	MON	SWE	POR	KEN	FRA	GRE	USA	NZL	ARG	FIN	CIV	ITA	GBR; Ret		NC	0
1988	Andrews Group / Mike Little Preparations	Ford Sierra RS Cosworth	MON	SWE	POR	KEN	FRA	GRC	USA	NZL	ARG	FIN	CIV	ITA	GBR; Ret		NC	0
1989	Andrews Sykes Ford Champions Team	Ford Sierra RS Cosworth	SWE	MON	POR	KEN	FRA	GRC	NZL	ARG	FIN	AUS	ITA	CIV	GBR; Ret		NC	0
1990	Rally Engineering Development	Ford Sierra RS Cosworth 4x4	MON	POR	KEN	FRA	GRC	NZL	ARG	FIN	AUS	ITA	CIV	GBR; 36			NC	0
1992	Russell Brookes	Ford Sierra RS Cosworth 4x4	MON	SWE	POR	KEN	FRA	GRC	NZL	ARG	FIN	AUS	ITA	CIV	ESP	GBR; 13	NC	0
1994	Russell Brookes	Rover Mini Cooper	MON	POR	KEN	FRA	GRC	ARG	NZL	FIN	ITA	GBR; 72					NC	0
