= 1997 British Rally Championship =

The 1997 Mobil 1 British Rally Championship was won by Manxman Mark Higgins in the Nissan Sunny GTI ahead of fellow Manxman Martin Rowe in the Renault Megane Maxi Kit Car, Alister Mcrae in the Volkswagen Golf and Welshman Gwyndaf Evans in the Ford Escort. The manufacturers championship was won by Volkswagen ahead of Nissan and Renault.

Calendar

Round	Event	Date
1	Vauxhall Rally of Wales	14–15 March
2–3	Pirelli International Rally	26–27 April
4	RSAC Scottish Rally	28–29 June
5	Stena Line Ulster Rally	1–2 August
6	Manx International Rally	11–13 September

== Teams and Drivers ==
Team	Manufacturer	Car	No	Driver	Rounds
Ford Motorsport	Ford	Escort Rs2000	1	Gwyndaf Evans	All
Ford Motorsport	Ford	Escort Rs2000		Dandy Rukmana	
Nissan Motorsports Europe	Nissan	Sunny GTI	2	Mark Higgins	All
Volkswagen Motorsport UK (SBG)	Volkswagen	Golf GTI Kit Car	3	Alister McRae	All
Volkswagen Motorsport UK (SBG)	Volkswagen	Golf GTI Kit Car	6	Tapio Laukkanen	All
Renault Dealer Rallying Association	Renault	Maxi Megane Kit Car	8	Martin Rowe	All
Renault Dealer Rallying Association	Renault	Maxi Megane Kit Car	5	Robbie Head	All
Seat Cupra Sport	SEAT	Ibiza Kit Car	4	Harri Rovanpera	1-4
Seat Cupra Sport	SEAT	Ibiza Kit Car	16	Kenny McKinstry	5 and 6
Seat Cupra Sport	SEAT	Ibiza Kit Car	12	Barbara Armstrong	All
Skoda Motorsport	Skoda	Felicia Kit Car	7	Stig Blomqvist	1, 2, 3, 5, 6
Skoda Motorsport	Skoda	Felicia Kit Car	29	Jaroslav Stary	4

Pos	Driver	Rd1	Rd2	Rd3	Rd4	Rd5	Rd6	Points
1	Mark Higgins	3rd	2nd	6th	DNF	1st	2nd	122
2	Martin Rowe			DNF	7th	4th	1st	112
3	Alister McRae	1st	30th		1st	8th	DNF	107
4	Gwyndaf Evans	2nd	1st	DNF	3rd	2nd	DNF	105
5	Robbie Head		3rd	1st	5th	3rd	DNF	99
6	Tapio Laukkanen		6th	2nd	2nd		3rd	91
7								
8								
9	Neil Wearden	9th	21st		DNF			
10	Stig Blomqvist	DNF		3rd			8th	
Pos	Entrant	Rd1	Rd2	Rd3	Rd4	Rd5	Rd6	Pts
1	Volkswagen	16			16	11	20	71
2	Nissan	9	6	3	0	20	31	69
3	Renault	0			7	13	30	67
4	Ford	12	8	3	12	16	15	66
5	SEAT					10	20	47
=	Skoda	6			5	8	20	47
7	Peugeot							45
8	Honda	7						40
