= 2022 British Rally Championship =

The British Rally Championship is a rallying series run over the course of a year, that comprises seven tarmac and gravel surface events. 2022 is to be the 64th season of the series. The season begins in Clacton, Essex on 23/24 April and is due to conclude on 29 October in the Welsh forests.

At the end of the season Osian Pryce and regular co-driver Noel O'Sullivan were declared 2022 champion driver and co-driver having won 4 out of the 7 events.

== 2022 calendar ==
For season 2022 there will be seven events, four on gravel and three on closed road tarmac surfaces. Reserve event for 2022 will take place at Oulton Park circuit in November.

Round	Dates	Event	Rally HQ	Surface	Website
1	23/24 April	Rally Tendring & Clacton	Clacton	Tarmac	(website)
2	27/28 May	Jim Clark Rally	Duns	Tarmac	(website)
3	9 July	Nicky Grist Stages	Builth Wells	Gravel	(website)
4	13 August	Grampian Forest Stages	Banchory	Gravel	(website)
5	3/4 September	Rali Bae Ceredigion	Aberystwyth	Tarmac	(website)
6	23/24 September	Trackrod Rally Yorkshire	Filey	Gravel	(website)
7	29 October	Cambrian Rally	Llandudno	Gravel	(website)
Reserve	5 November	Oulton Park Stages	Oulton Park	Tarmac	(website)

== Entrants ==
=== BRC1 ===
Rally2/R5 Entries
Car	Entrant / Team	Driver	Co-Driver	Rounds
Volkswagen Polo GTI R5	(United Kingdom) Melvyn Evans Motorsport	(United Kingdom) Osian Pryce	(Republic of Ireland) Noel O'Sullivan	1–6
Volkswagen Polo GTI R5	(United Kingdom) Melvyn Evans Motorsport	(United Kingdom) Jason Pritchard	(United Kingdom) Phil Clarke	1–5
Volkswagen Polo GTI R5	(United Kingdom) Melvyn Evans Motorsport	(United Kingdom) Meirion Evans	(United Kingdom) Jonathan Jackson	2, 5
Volkswagen Polo GTI R5	(United Kingdom) Tom Gahan Motorsport	(Republic of Ireland) Keith Cronin	(Republic of Ireland) Mikie Galvin	1–5
Volkswagen Polo GTI R5	(Republic of Ireland) Motorsport Ireland Rally Academy	(Republic of Ireland) Eamonn Kelly	(Republic of Ireland) Conor Mohan	7
Škoda Fabia R5	(United Kingdom) Inspira Rally Team	(United Kingdom) Ruairi Bell	(United Kingdom) Max Freeman	All
Škoda Fabia R5	(United Kingdom) Dylan Davies Rallying	(United Kingdom) Garry Pearson	(United Kingdom) Dale Furniss	6–7
Ford Fiesta Rally2	(United Kingdom) NPL Rally Hire	(United Kingdom) Garry Pearson	(United Kingdom) Dale Furniss	1–5
Ford Fiesta Rally2	(United Kingdom) DMG Motorsport	(United Kingdom) Elliot Payne	(United Kingdom) Tom Woodburn	1
Ford Fiesta Rally2	(United Kingdom) DMG Motorsport	(United Kingdom) Elliot Payne	(United Kingdom) Patrick Walsh	2–5
Ford Fiesta R5	(United Kingdom) Andy Davies Rallying	(United Kingdom) Andy Davies	(United Kingdom) Robert Fagg	1
Ford Fiesta R5	(United Kingdom) Andy Davies Rallying	(United Kingdom) Andy Davies	(United Kingdom) Michael Gilbey	3–5
Hyundai i20 R5	(Republic of Ireland) Macsport Rally Team	(United Kingdom) James Williams	(United Kingdom) Dai Roberts	All
Sources: Official rally entry lists:

=== BRC Junior ===
Rally4/R2 entries
Car	Entrant / Team	Driver	Co-Driver	Rounds
Ford Fiesta Rally4	(Republic of Ireland) Donagh Kelly	(Republic of Ireland) Eamonn Kelly	(Republic of Ireland) Conor Mohan	1-2
Ford Fiesta Rally4	(Norway) Ola Nore Jr	(Norway) Ola Nore Jr	(United Kingdom) Jack Morton	1
Ford Fiesta Rally4	(United Kingdom) Fraser Anderson	(United Kingdom) Fraser Anderson	(United Kingdom) Sinclair Young	1
Ford Fiesta Rally4	(United Kingdom) DGM Sport	(Republic of Ireland) Johnnie Mulholland	(Republic of Ireland) Eoin Treacy	1-2
Ford Fiesta R2T	(Republic of Ireland) Kyle McBride	(Republic of Ireland) Kyle McBride	(Republic of Ireland) Kenny Bustard	1
Ford Fiesta R2T	(Republic of Ireland) Kyle McBride	(Republic of Ireland) Kyle McBride	(Republic of Ireland) Liam McIntyre	2
Peugeot 208 Rally4	(United Kingdom) Kyle White	(United Kingdom) Kyle White	(United Kingdom) Sean Topping	1-2
Peugeot 208 Rally4	(United Kingdom) West Wales Rally Spares	(United Kingdom) Ioan Lloyd	(United Kingdom) Sion Williams	1-2
Sources: Official rally entry lists:

== 2022 events podium ==
Round	Rally name	Podium finishers			
Round	Rally name	Placing	Driver / Co-Driver	Car	Time / Diff leader
1	Rally Tendring & Clacton (23/24 April)	1	Osian Pryce / Noel O'Sullivan	Volkswagen Polo GTI R5	42:38.4
1	Rally Tendring & Clacton (23/24 April)	2	Keith Cronin / Mikie Galvin	Volkswagen Polo GTI R5	+ 00:05.4
1	Rally Tendring & Clacton (23/24 April)	3	James Williams / Dai Roberts	Hyundai i20 R5	+ 00:21.2
2	Jim Clark Rally (27/28 May)	1	Keith Cronin / Mikie Galvin	Volkswagen Polo GTI R5	49:48.9
2	Jim Clark Rally (27/28 May)	2	James Williams / Dai Roberts	Hyundai i20 R5	+ 00:36.2
2	Jim Clark Rally (27/28 May)	3	Garry Pearson / Dale Furniss	Ford Fiesta Rally2	+ 00:58.3
3	Nicky Grist Stages (9 July)	1	Osian Pryce / Noel O'Sullivan	Volkswagen Polo GTI R5	45:03.4
3	Nicky Grist Stages (9 July)	2	Keith Cronin / Mikie Galvin	Volkswagen Polo GTI R5	+00:14.9
3	Nicky Grist Stages (9 July)	3	Jason Pritchard / Phil Clarke	Volkswagen Polo GTI R5	+00:24.4
4	Grampian Forest Rally (13 August)	1	Keith Cronin / Mikie Galvin	Volkswagen Polo GTI R5	39:12
4	Grampian Forest Rally (13 August)	2	Osian Pryce / Noel O'Sullivan	Volkswagen Polo GTI R5	+0:21
4	Grampian Forest Rally (13 August)	3	Ruairi Bell / Max Freeman	Skoda Fabia R5	+0:29
5	Rali Bae Ceredigion (3/4 September)	1	Osian Pryce / Noel O'Sullivan	Volkswagen Polo GTI R5	1:20:34.7
5	Rali Bae Ceredigion (3/4 September)	2	James Williams / Dai Roberts	Hyundai i20 N Rally2	+1:25.3
5	Rali Bae Ceredigion (3/4 September)	3	Ruairi Bell / Max Freeman	Skoda Fabia R5	+3:18.4
6	Trackrod Rally (23/24 September	1	Osian Pryce / Noel O'Sullivan	Volkswagen Polo GTI R5	0:54:12.7
6	Trackrod Rally (23/24 September	2	Keith Cronin / Mikie Galvin	Volkswagen Polo	+0:20.4
6	Trackrod Rally (23/24 September	3	Ruairi Bell / Max Freeman	Škoda Fabia R5	+0:26.6
7	Cambrian Rally (29 October)	1	Ruairi Bell / Max Freeman	Škoda Fabia R5	+01:51.8
7	Cambrian Rally (29 October)	2	Eamonn Kelly / Conor Mohan	Volkswagen Polo GTI R5	+03:00.5
7	Cambrian Rally (29 October)	3	James Williams / Dai Roberts	Hyundai i20 R5	+05:50.1

== 2022 British Rally Championship for Drivers ==
=== Scoring system ===
Points are awarded as follows: 25, 18, 15, 12, 10, 8, 6, 4, 2, 1. Drivers may nominate one event as their 'joker', on which they will score additional points: 5, 4, 3, 2, 1. Competitors five best scores will count towards their championship total.

Position	1st	2nd	3rd	4th	5th	6th	7th	8th	9th	10th
Points	25	18	15	12	10	8	6	4	2	1
Joker Points	5	4	3	2	1					

Pos	Co-Driver	RTC	JCR	NGS	GFR	RBC	TRA	CAM	Points
1	Osian Pryce	25	EXC	25	18	25	25 *	DNS	123
2	Keith Cronin	18	25	18	25	Ret	18	DNS	104
3	James Williams	15	18	Ret	12	18	12	18 *	81
4	Ruairi Bell	Ret	8	Ret *	15	15	15	25	78
5	Garry Pearson	Ret	18 *	12	Ret	12	10	Ret	52
Pos	Co-Driver	RTC	JCR	NGS	GFR	RBC	TRA	CAM	Pts

Key
Colour	Result
Gold	Winner
Silver	2nd place
Bronze	3rd place
Green	Non-podium finish
Purple	Did not finish (Ret)
Black	Disqualified (DSQ)
Black	Excluded (EXC)
White	Did not start (DNS)
*	Joker played
