= Rory Galligan =

Irish rally car driver

- Born: 1973
- Died: 2012 (aged 38–39)

Rory Galligan (1973–2012) was a rally car driver from Oldcastle, Ireland who retired from the sport in 2006 because of a diagnosis of motor neuron disease, dying on 21 May 2012.

He began to race in 1993 but was most successful in the late 1990s in a Peugeot 205, and later earned a spot on the Mitsubishi works team in the British Rally Championship in 2005 before his 2006 retirement.

After retiring, Galligan taught road safety to new drivers.
