= British people =

People of the United Kingdom and its territories

- Union Flag

Total population
- British c. 72 million; British diaspora c. 200 million

Regions with significant populations
- United Kingdom; 57,678,000 (Note: British citizens of any race or ethnicity.)
- United States: 109,531,643 (Note: People who identify of full or partial British ancestry born into that country.); 678,000 (Note: UK-born people who identify of British ancestry only.)
- Australia: 19,301,379; 1,300,000 (Note: British citizens or nationals.)
- Canada: 17,325,860; 603,000
- New Zealand: 3,372,708; 215,000
- South Africa: 1,603,575; 212,000
- Chile: 700,000
- France: 400,000
- Spain: 297,229
- Ireland: 291,000
- Argentina: 270,000
- United Arab Emirates: 240,000
- Germany: 115,000

Languages
- English: Angloromani; Antiguan and Barbudan Creole; British Sign; Cornish; Guernésiais; Irish; Irish Sign; Jèrriais; Llanito; Manx; Pitkern; Sercquiais; Shelta; Turks and Caicos Creole; Virgin Islands Creole; Welsh; Scots (including Ulster-Scots); Scottish Gaelic

Religion
- Traditionally Christianity (Anglicanism, Presbyterianism, Catholicism, Methodism): See also: Religion in the United Kingdom

Related ethnic groups
- Irish People

British people or Britons, also known colloquially as Brits, are the citizens and diaspora of the United Kingdom, the British Overseas Territories, and the Crown dependencies. British nationality law governs modern British citizenship and nationality, which can be acquired, for instance, by descent from British nationals. When used in a historical context, "British" or "Britons" can refer to the Ancient Britons, the Celtic-speaking inhabitants of Great Britain during the Iron Age, whose descendants formed the major part of the modern Welsh people, Cornish people, Bretons and considerable proportions of English people. It also refers to those British subjects born in parts of the former British Empire that are now independent countries who settled in the United Kingdom prior to 1973.

Though early assertions of being British date from the Late Middle Ages, the Union of the Crowns in 1603 and the creation of the Kingdom of Great Britain in 1707 triggered a sense of British national identity. The notion of Britishness and a shared British identity was forged during the 18th century and early 19th century when Britain engaged in several global conflicts with France, and developed further during the Victorian era. The complex history of the formation of the United Kingdom created a "particular sense of nationhood and belonging" in Great Britain; Britishness became "superimposed on much older identities", of English, Scots and Welsh cultures, whose distinctiveness still resists notions of a homogenised British identity. Because of longstanding ethno-sectarian divisions, British identity in Northern Ireland is controversial, but it is held with strong conviction by Unionists.

Modern Britons are mainly descended from the various ethnic groups who settled in Great Britain before the 11th century AD: the Bell Beakers, the Insular Celts, the Anglo-Saxons, the Norsemen and the Normans. The progressive political unification of the British Isles facilitated migration, cultural and linguistic exchange, and intermarriage between the peoples of England, Scotland and Wales during the late Middle Ages, early modern period and beyond. Since 1922 and earlier, there has been immigration to the United Kingdom by people from what is now the Republic of Ireland, the Commonwealth, mainland Europe and elsewhere; they and their descendants are mostly British citizens, with some assuming a British, dual or hyphenated identity. This includes the groups Black British and Asian British people, which together constitute around 10% of the British population.

The British are a diverse, multinational, multicultural and multilingual people, with "strong regional accents, expressions and identities". The social structure of the United Kingdom has changed radically since the 19th century, with a decline in religious observance, enlargement of the middle class, and increased ethnic diversity, particularly since the 1950s, when citizens of the British Empire were encouraged to immigrate to Britain to work as part of the recovery from World War II. The population of the UK stands at around 67 million, with around 50 million being White British. This includes 44.4 million in England and Wales as of 2021, and 4.2 million in Scotland as of 2022. 1.8 million identify as White in Northern Ireland, including White British and other White ethnicities, as of 2021. Outside of the UK, the British diaspora totals around 200 million with higher concentrations in the United States, Australia, Canada, and New Zealand, with smaller concentrations in the Republic of Ireland, Chile, South Africa, and parts of the Caribbean.

== History of the term ==
The earliest known reference to the inhabitants of Great Britain may have come from 4th century BC records of the voyage of Pytheas, a Greek geographer who made a voyage of exploration around the British Isles. Although none of his own writings remain, writers during the time of the Roman Empire made much reference to them. Pytheas called the islands collectively αἱ Βρεττανίαι (hai Brettaniai), which has been translated as the Brittanic Isles, and the peoples of what are today England, Wales, Scotland and the Isle of Man of Prettanike were called the Πρεττανοί (Prettanoi), Priteni, Pritani or Pretani.

The group included Ireland, which was referred to as Ierne (Insula sacra "sacred island" as the Greeks interpreted it) "inhabited by the different race of Hiberni" (gens hibernorum), and Britain as insula Albionum, "island of the Albions". The term Pritani may have reached Pytheas from the Gauls, who possibly used it as their term for the inhabitants of the islands.

Greek and Roman writers, in the 1st century BC and the 1st century AD, name the inhabitants of Great Britain and Ireland as the Priteni, the origin of the Latin word Britanni. It has been suggested that this name derives from a Gaulish description translated as "people of the forms", referring to the custom of tattooing or painting their bodies with blue woad made from Isatis tinctoria. Parthenius, an Ancient Greek grammarian, and the Etymologicum Genuinum, a 9th-century lexical encyclopaedia, mention a mythical character Bretannus (the Latinised form of the Ancient Greek: Βρεττανός, Brettanós) as the father of Celtine, mother of Celtus, the eponymous ancestor of the Celts.

By 50 BC, Greek geographers were using equivalents of Prettanikē as a collective name for the British Isles. However, with the Roman conquest of Britain, the Latin term Britannia was used for the island of Great Britain, and later Roman-occupied Britain south of Caledonia (modern day Scotland north of the rivers Forth and Clyde), although the people of Caledonia and the north were also the selfsame Britons during the Roman period, the Gaels not arriving until four centuries later. Following the end of Roman rule in Britain, the island of Great Britain was left open to invasion by pagan, seafaring warriors such as Germanic-speaking Anglo-Saxons and Jutes from Continental Europe, who gained control in areas around the south east, and to Middle Irish-speaking people migrating from the north of Ireland to the north of Great Britain, founding Gaelic kingdoms such as Dál Riata and Alba, which would eventually subsume the native Brittonic and Pictish kingdoms and become Scotland.

In this sub-Roman Britain, as Anglo-Saxon culture spread across southern and eastern Britain and Gaelic through much of the north, the demonym "Briton" became restricted to the Brittonic-speaking inhabitants of what would later be called Wales, Cornwall, North West England (Cumbria), and a southern part of Scotland (Strathclyde). In addition, the term was also applied to Brittany in what is today France and Britonia in north west Spain, both regions having been colonised in the 5th century by Britons fleeing the Anglo-Saxon invasions. However, the term "Britannia" persisted as the Latin name for the island. The Historia Brittonum claimed legendary origins as a prestigious genealogy for Brittonic kings, followed by the Historia Regum Britanniae, which popularised this pseudo-history to support the claims of the Kings of England.

During the Middle Ages, and particularly in the Tudor period, the term "British" was used to refer to the Welsh people and Cornish people. At that time, it was "the long held belief that these were the remaining descendants of the Britons and that they spoke 'the British tongue'". This notion was supported by texts such as the Historia Regum Britanniae, a pseudohistorical account of ancient British history, written in the mid-12th century by Geoffrey of Monmouth. The Historia Regum Britanniae chronicled the lives of legendary kings of the Britons in a narrative spanning 2000 years, beginning with the Trojans founding the ancient British nation and continuing until the Anglo-Saxon settlement of Britain in the 7th century forced the Britons to the west, i.e. Wales and Cornwall, and north, i.e. Cumbria, Strathclyde and northern Scotland. This legendary Celtic history of Great Britain is known as the Matter of Britain. The Matter of Britain, a national myth, was retold or reinterpreted in works by Gerald of Wales, a Cambro-Norman chronicler who, in the 12th and 13th centuries, used the term "British" to refer to the people later known as the Welsh.

== History ==
=== Ancestral roots ===
The indigenous people of the British Isles have a combination of Celtic, Anglo-Saxon, Norse and Norman ancestry. Between the 8th and 11th centuries, "three major cultural divisions" emerged in Great Britain: the English, the Scots and the Welsh. The earlier Brittonic Celtic polities in what are today England and Scotland were absorbed into Anglo-Saxon England and Gaelic Scotland by the early 11th century. According to the medieval English historian Bede, "the miserable remainder [of Britons], being taken in the mountains [modern Wales], were butchered in heaps" and "Others, continuing in their own country, led a miserable life among the woods, rocks, and mountains, [modern Wales]". Although recent scholarship doubts this part of Bede's narrative, it is widely accepted that a large portion of the native British population fled to modern Wales and Cornwall and formed a new identity.

The English had been unified under a single nation state in 937 by King Athelstan of Wessex after the Battle of Brunanburh. The Scottish state is believed to have been unified earlier during the reign of Kenneth MacAlpin (848–858), after his campaigns to assimilate the Picts into the Dál Riata kingdom. Owain of Gwynedd was the only Welsh sovereign to rule over the entirety of Wales. He used the title King of Wales in the 1160s to claim hegemony over other native British kingdoms.

Before unification, the English (known then in Old English as the Anglecynn) were under the governance of independent Anglo-Saxon petty kingdoms, which gradually coalesced into a Heptarchy of seven powerful states, the most powerful of which were Mercia and Wessex. In 934, the unified English kingdom under Athelstan invaded Scotland, achieving only partial success. Concurrently, the British Isles were under attack by raiding Viking bands. Scottish historian Neil Oliver said that the Battle of Brunanburh, which pitted the Anglo-Saxons against the Scots and Vikings, would "define the shape of Britain into the modern era"; it was a "showdown for two very different ethnic identities – a Norse Celtic alliance versus Anglo Saxon. It aimed to settle once and for all whether Britain would be controlled by a single imperial power or remain several separate independent kingdoms, a split in perceptions which is still very much with us today".

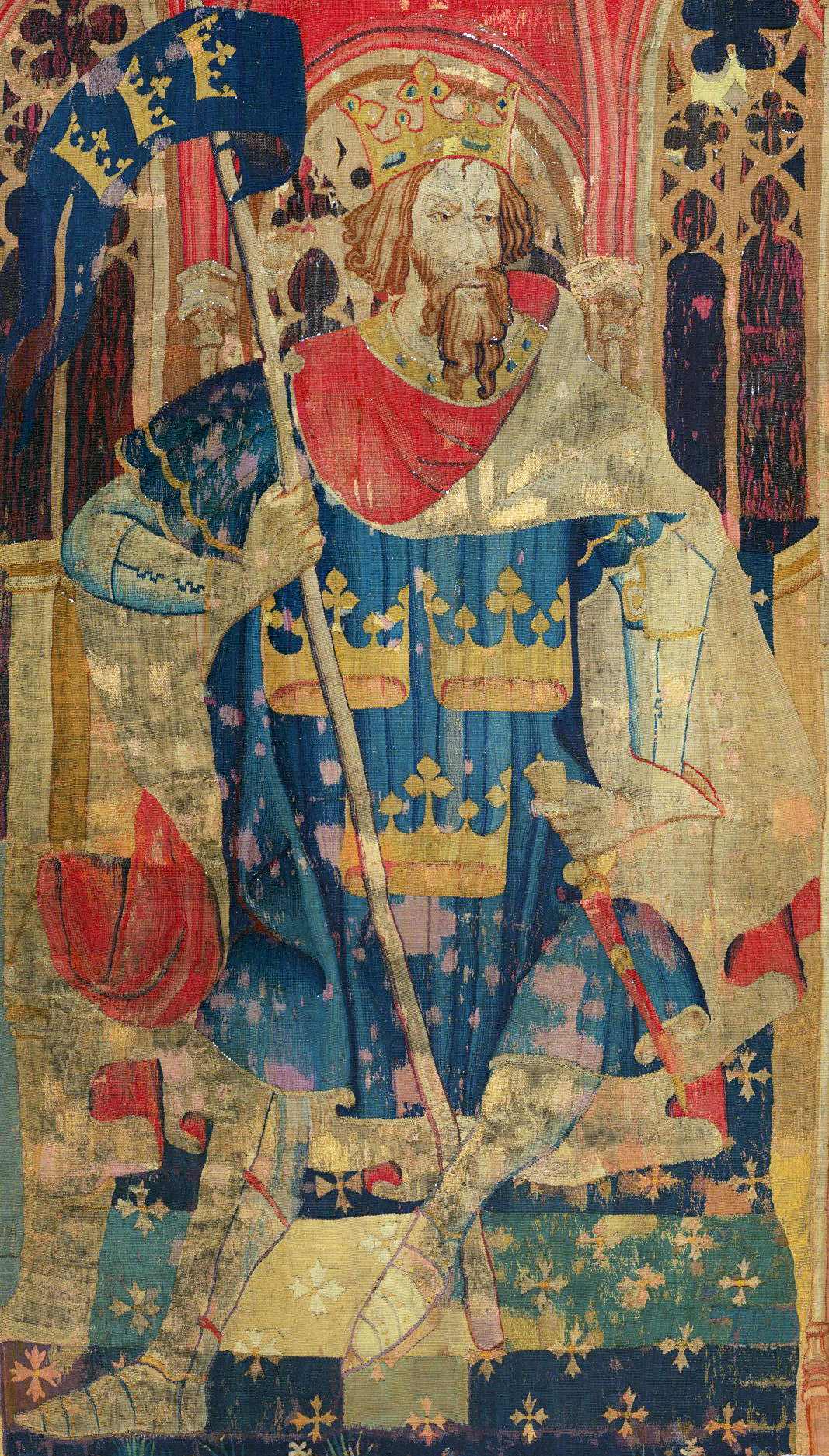
Medieval tapestry showing King Arthur, a legendary ancient British ruler who had a leading role in the Matter of Britain, a national myth used as propaganda for the ancestral origins of the British royal family and their British subjects

=== Medieval Britain ===
Between 1277–1288, several of the Welsh petty kingdoms were conquered by Edward I of England. Parts of South Wales had already been conquered by Norman knights centuries earlier. The English King deposed of the last native Prince of Wales, claimed the title for his son, and compelled all the other native princes to submit to him. Edward's reign also saw several wars of conquest against neighboring Scotland; his successful invasion of Scotland and brief occupation of the country marked the first time in history Great Britain was united under one ruler. Historian Simon Schama suggested that it was Edward I who solely was "responsible for provoking the peoples of Britain into an awareness of their nationhood" in the 13th century. Schama hypothesised that Scottish national identity, "a complex amalgam" of Gaelic, Brittonic, Pictish, Norsemen and Anglo-Norman origins, was not finally forged until the Wars of Scottish Independence against the Kingdom of England in the late 13th and early 14th centuries.

Wales, after being conquered by England, had its legal system replaced by that of the Kingdom of England's under the Laws in Wales Acts 1535–1542. Despite this, the Welsh people endured as a nation distinct from the English; and to some degree the Cornish people, who also retained a distinct Brittonic identity and language. Owain Glyndwr's revolt against England was the last manifestation of Welsh independence.

According to historian Neil McGuigan, the frontier region of Lothian during the 13th century could be considered British – in the modern sense of the word – in "heritage and ethnic character". Although de jure part of Scotland, "it remained administratively and ideologically distinct from 'Scotland' (Latin: Scotia, Gaelic: Alba), the polity that gave their common ruler his royal title." The border between England and Scotland at the time were ambiguous, the inhabitants of Lothian were a mix of English and Scottish, and thus the region became a magnet for cultural change. As in other parts of what is now the Scottish lowlands, the inhabitants mostly spoke Old Scots, a language variety that is descended from Old Northumbrian English. The use of Scots became dominant nationwide by the reforms of King David I (r. 1124–1153), an Anglophile who himself was of partly English heritage through the marriage of princess Margaret of Wessex into the Scottish throne.

Later, with both an English Reformation and a Scottish Reformation, Edward VI of England, under the counsel of Edward Seymour, 1st Duke of Somerset, advocated a union with the Kingdom of Scotland, joining England, Wales and Scotland in a united Protestant Great Britain. The Duke of Somerset supported the unification of the English, Welsh and Scots under the "indifferent old name of Britons" on the basis that their monarchies "both derived from a Pre-Roman British monarchy".

Following the death of Elizabeth I of England in 1603, the throne of England was inherited by James VI, King of Scots, so that the Kingdom of England and the Kingdom of Scotland were united in a personal union under James VI of Scotland and I of England, an event referred to as the Union of the Crowns. James was the first of 6 Stuart monarchs to rule Britain, the House of Stuart being a Roman Catholic house of Scottish ancestry. There was much anxiety in England over having a Scottish monarch; William Shakespeare's famous play, Macbeth, is said to be a warning to King James.

King James advocated full political union between England and Scotland, and on 20 October 1604 proclaimed his assumption of the style "King of Great Britain", though this title was rejected by both the Parliament of England and the Parliament of Scotland and thus had no basis in either English law or Scots law.

=== Union and the development of Britishness ===
The "King's Colour".On 12 April 1606, the Union Flag representing the personal union between the Kingdoms of England and Scotland was specified in a royal decree. The St George's Cross and St Andrew's saltire were "joined together ... to be published to our Subjects."

Despite centuries of military and religious conflict, the Kingdoms of England and Scotland had been "drawing increasingly together" since the Protestant Reformation of the 16th century and the Union of the Crowns in 1603. A broadly shared language, island, monarch, religion and Bible (the Authorized King James Version) further contributed to a growing cultural alliance between the two sovereign realms and their peoples. The Glorious Revolution of 1688 resulted in a pair of Acts of the English and Scottish legislatures—the Bill of Rights 1689 and Claim of Right Act 1689 respectively—that ensured that the shared constitutional monarchy of England and Scotland was held only by Protestants. Despite this, although popular with the monarchy and much of the aristocracy, attempts to unite the two states by Acts of Parliament were unsuccessful in 1606, 1667 and 1689; increased political management of Scottish affairs from England had led to "criticism" and had strained Anglo-Scottish relations.

While English maritime explorations during the Age of Discovery gave new-found imperial power and wealth to the English and Welsh at the end of the 17th century, Scotland suffered from a long-standing weak economy. In response, the Scottish kingdom, in opposition to William II of Scotland (III of England), commenced the Darien Scheme, an attempt to establish a Scottish imperial outlet—the colony of New Caledonia—on the isthmus of Panama. However, through a combination of disease, Spanish hostility, Scottish mismanagement and opposition to the scheme by the East India Company and the English government (who did not want to provoke the Spanish into war) this imperial venture ended in "catastrophic failure", with an estimated "25% of Scotland's total liquid capital" lost.

The events of the Darien Scheme, and the passing by the English Parliament of the Act of Settlement 1701 asserting the right to choose the order of succession for English, Scottish and Irish thrones, escalated political hostilities between England and Scotland and neutralised calls for a united British people. The Parliament of Scotland responded by passing the Act of Security 1704, allowing it to appoint a different monarch to succeed to the Scottish crown from that of England if it so wished. The English political perspective was that the appointment of a Jacobite monarchy in Scotland opened up the possibility of a Franco-Scottish military conquest of England during the Second Hundred Years' War and War of the Spanish Succession. The Parliament of England passed the Alien Act 1705, which provided that Scottish nationals in England were to be treated as aliens and estates held by Scots would be treated as alien property, whilst also restricting the import of Scottish products into England and its colonies (about half of Scotland's trade). However, the Act contained a provision that it would be suspended if the Parliament of Scotland entered into negotiations regarding the creation of a unified Parliament of Great Britain, which in turn would refund Scottish financial losses on the Darien Scheme.

=== Union of Scotland and England ===
Despite opposition from within both Scotland and England, a Treaty of Union was agreed in 1706 and was then ratified by the parliaments of both countries with the passing of the Acts of Union 1707. With effect from 1 May 1707, this created a new sovereign state called the "Kingdom of Great Britain". This kingdom "began as a hostile merger", but led to a "full partnership in the most powerful going concern in the world"; historian Simon Schama stated that "it was one of the most astonishing transformations in European history". After 1707, a British national identity began to develop, though it was initially resisted, particularly by the English. The peoples of Great Britain had by the 1750s begun to assume a "layered identity": to think of themselves as simultaneously British and also Scottish, English, or Welsh.

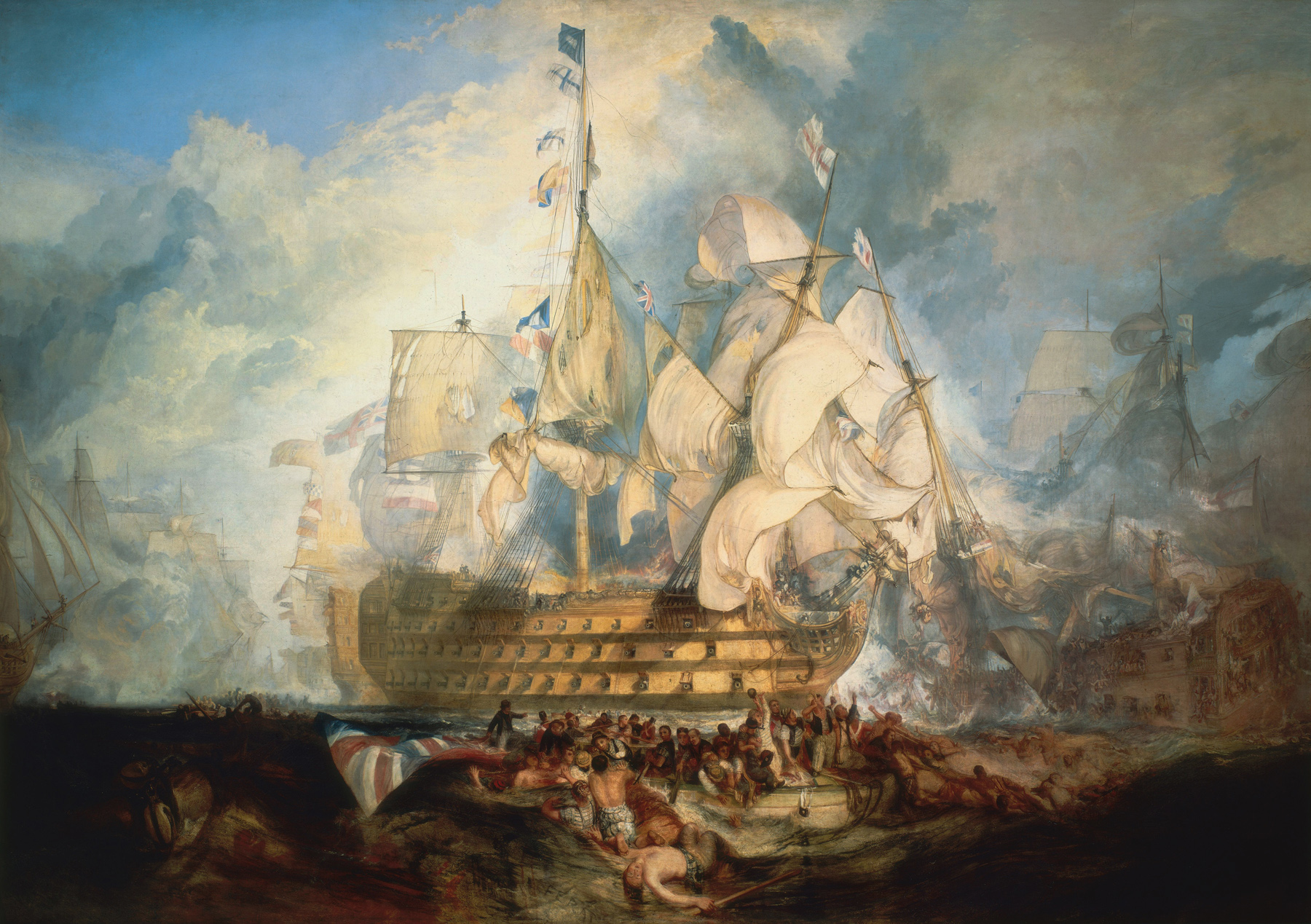
The Battle of Trafalgar by J. M. W. Turner (oil on canvas, 1822–1824) combines events from several moments during the Napoleonic Wars' Battle of Trafalgar—a major British naval victory upon which Britishness has drawn influence.

The terms North Briton and South Briton were devised for the Scots and the English respectively, with the former gaining some preference in Scotland, particularly by the economists and philosophers of the Scottish Enlightenment. Indeed, it was the "Scots [who] played key roles in shaping the contours of British identity"; "their scepticism about the Union allowed the Scots the space and time in which to dominate the construction of Britishness in its early crucial years", drawing upon the notion of a shared "spirit of liberty common to both Saxon and Celt ... against the usurpation of the Church of Rome". James Thomson was a poet and playwright born to a Church of Scotland minister in the Scottish Lowlands in 1700 who was interested in forging a common British culture and national identity in this way. In collaboration with Thomas Arne, they wrote Alfred, an opera about Alfred the Great's victory against the Vikings performed to Frederick, Prince of Wales in 1740 to commemorate the accession of George I and the birthday of Princess Augusta. "Rule, Britannia!" was the climactic piece of the opera and quickly became a "jingoistic" British patriotic song celebrating "Britain's supremacy offshore". An island country with a series of victories for the Royal Navy associated empire and naval warfare "inextricably with ideals of Britishness and Britain's place in the world".

Britannia, the new national personification of Great Britain, was established in the 1750s as a representation of "nation and empire rather than any single national hero". On Britannia and British identity, historian Peter Borsay wrote:

Up until 1797 Britannia was conventionally depicted holding a spear, but as a consequence of the increasingly prominent role of the Royal Navy in the war against the French, and of several spectacular victories, the spear was replaced by a trident... The navy had come to be seen...as the very bulwark of British liberty and the essence of what it was to be British.

From the Union of 1707 through to the Battle of Waterloo in 1815, Great Britain was "involved in successive, very dangerous wars with Catholic France", but which "all brought enough military and naval victories ... to flatter British pride". As the Napoleonic Wars with the First French Empire advanced, "the English and Scottish learned to define themselves as similar primarily by virtue of not being French or Catholic". In combination with sea power and empire, the notion of Britishness became more "closely bound up with Protestantism", a cultural commonality through which the English, Scots and Welsh became "fused together, and remain[ed] so, despite their many cultural divergences".

The neo-classical monuments that proliferated at the end of the 18th century and the start of the 19th century, such as The Kymin at Monmouth, were attempts to meld the concepts of Britishness with the Greco-Roman empires of classical antiquity. The new and expanding British Empire provided "unprecedented opportunities for upward mobility and the accumulations of wealth", and so the "Scottish, Welsh and Irish populations were prepared to suppress nationalist issues on pragmatic grounds". The British Empire was "crucial to the idea of a British identity and to the self-image of Britishness". Indeed, the Scottish welcomed Britishness during the 19th century "for it offered a context within which they could hold on to their own identity whilst participating in, and benefiting from, the expansion of the [British] Empire". Similarly, the "new emphasis of Britishness was broadly welcomed by the Welsh who considered themselves to be the lineal descendants of the ancient Britons – a word that was still used to refer exclusively to the Welsh". For the English, however, by the Victorian era their enthusiastic adoption of Britishness had meant that, for them, Britishness "meant the same as 'Englishness'", so much so that "Englishness and Britishness" and "'England' and 'Britain' were used interchangeably in a variety of contexts". England has "always been the dominant component of the British Isles in terms of size, population and power"; Magna Carta, common law and hostility to continental Europe were English factors that influenced British sensibilities.

=== Union with Ireland ===
The political union in 1800 of the predominantly Catholic Kingdom of Ireland with Great Britain, coupled with the outbreak of peace with France in the early 19th century, challenged the previous century's concept of militant Protestant Britishness. The new, expanded United Kingdom of Great Britain and Ireland meant that the state had to re-evaluate its position on the civil rights of Catholics, and extend its definition of Britishness to the Irish people. Like the terms that had been invented at the time of the Acts of Union 1707, "West Briton" was introduced for the Irish after 1800. In 1832 Daniel O'Connell, an Irish politician who campaigned for Catholic Emancipation, stated in Britain's House of Commons:

The people of Ireland are ready to become a portion of the British Empire, provided they be made so in reality and not in name alone; they are ready to become a kind of West Briton if made so in benefits and justice; but if not, we are Irishmen again.

Ireland, from 1801 to 1923, was marked by a succession of economic and political mismanagement and neglect, which marginalised the Irish, and advanced Irish nationalism. In the forty years that followed the Union, successive British governments grappled with the problems of governing a country which had as Benjamin Disraeli, a staunch anti-Irish and anti-Catholic member of the Conservative party with a virulent racial and religious prejudice towards Ireland put it in 1844, "a starving population, an absentee aristocracy, and an alien Church, and in addition the weakest executive in the world". Although the vast majority of Unionists in Ireland proclaimed themselves "simultaneously Irish and British", even for them there was a strain upon the adoption of Britishness after the Great Famine.

War continued to be a unifying factor for the people of Great Britain: British jingoism re-emerged during the Boer Wars in southern Africa. The experience of military, political and economic power from the rise of the British Empire led to a very specific drive in artistic technique, taste and sensibility for Britishness. In 1887, Frederic Harrison wrote:

Morally, we Britons plant the British flag on every peak and pass; and wherever the Union Jack floats there we place the cardinal British institutions—tea, tubs, sanitary appliances, lawn tennis, and churches.

The Roman Catholic Relief Act 1829 reflected a "marked change in attitudes" in Great Britain towards Catholics and Catholicism. A "significant" example of this was the collaboration between Augustus Welby Pugin, an "ardent Roman Catholic" and son of a Frenchman, and Sir Charles Barry, "a confirmed Protestant", in redesigning the Palace of Westminster—"the building that most enshrines ... Britain's national and imperial pre-tensions". Protestantism gave way to imperialism as the leading element of British national identity during the Victorian and Edwardian eras, and as such, a series of royal, imperial and national celebrations were introduced to the British people to assert imperial British culture and give themselves a sense of uniqueness, superiority and national consciousness. Empire Day and jubilees of Queen Victoria were introduced to the British middle class, but quickly "merged into a national 'tradition'".

=== Modern period ===
A famous First World War-era recruitment poster, stressing the concept of British national identity

The First World War "reinforced the sense of Britishness" and patriotism in the early 20th century. Through war service (including conscription in Great Britain), "the English, Welsh, Scots and Irish fought as British". The aftermath of the war institutionalised British national commemoration through Remembrance Sunday and the Poppy Appeal. The Second World War had a similar unifying effect upon the British people, however, its outcome was to recondition Britishness on a basis of democratic values and its marked contrast to Europeanism. Notions that the British "constituted an Island race, and that it stood for democracy were reinforced during the war and they were circulated in the country through Winston Churchill's speeches, history books and newspapers".

At its international zenith, "Britishness joined peoples around the world in shared traditions and common loyalties that were strenuously maintained". But following the two world wars, the British Empire experienced rapid decolonisation. The secession of the Irish Free State from the United Kingdom meant that Britishness had lost "its Irish dimension" in 1922, and the shrinking empire supplanted by independence movements dwindled the appeal of British identity in the Commonwealth of Nations during the mid-20th century.

Since the British Nationality Act 1948 and the subsequent mass immigration to the United Kingdom from the Commonwealth and elsewhere in the world, "the expression and experience of cultural life in Britain has become fragmented and reshaped by the influences of gender, ethnicity, class and region". Furthermore, the United Kingdom's membership of the European Economic Community in 1973 eroded the concept of Britishness as distinct from continental Europe. As such, since the 1970s "there has been a sense of crisis about what it has meant to be British", exacerbated by growing demands for greater political autonomy for Northern Ireland, Scotland, and Wales.

The late 20th century saw major changes to the politics of the United Kingdom with the establishment of devolved national administrations for Northern Ireland, Scotland, and Wales following pre-legislative referendums. Calls for greater autonomy for the four countries of the United Kingdom had existed since their original union with each other, but gathered pace in the 1960s and 1970s. Devolution has led to "increasingly assertive Scottish, Welsh and Irish national identities", resulting in more diverse cultural expressions of Britishness, or else its outright rejection: Gwynfor Evans, a Welsh nationalist politician active in the late 20th century, rebuffed Britishness as "a political synonym for Englishness which extends English culture over the Scots, Welsh and the Irish".

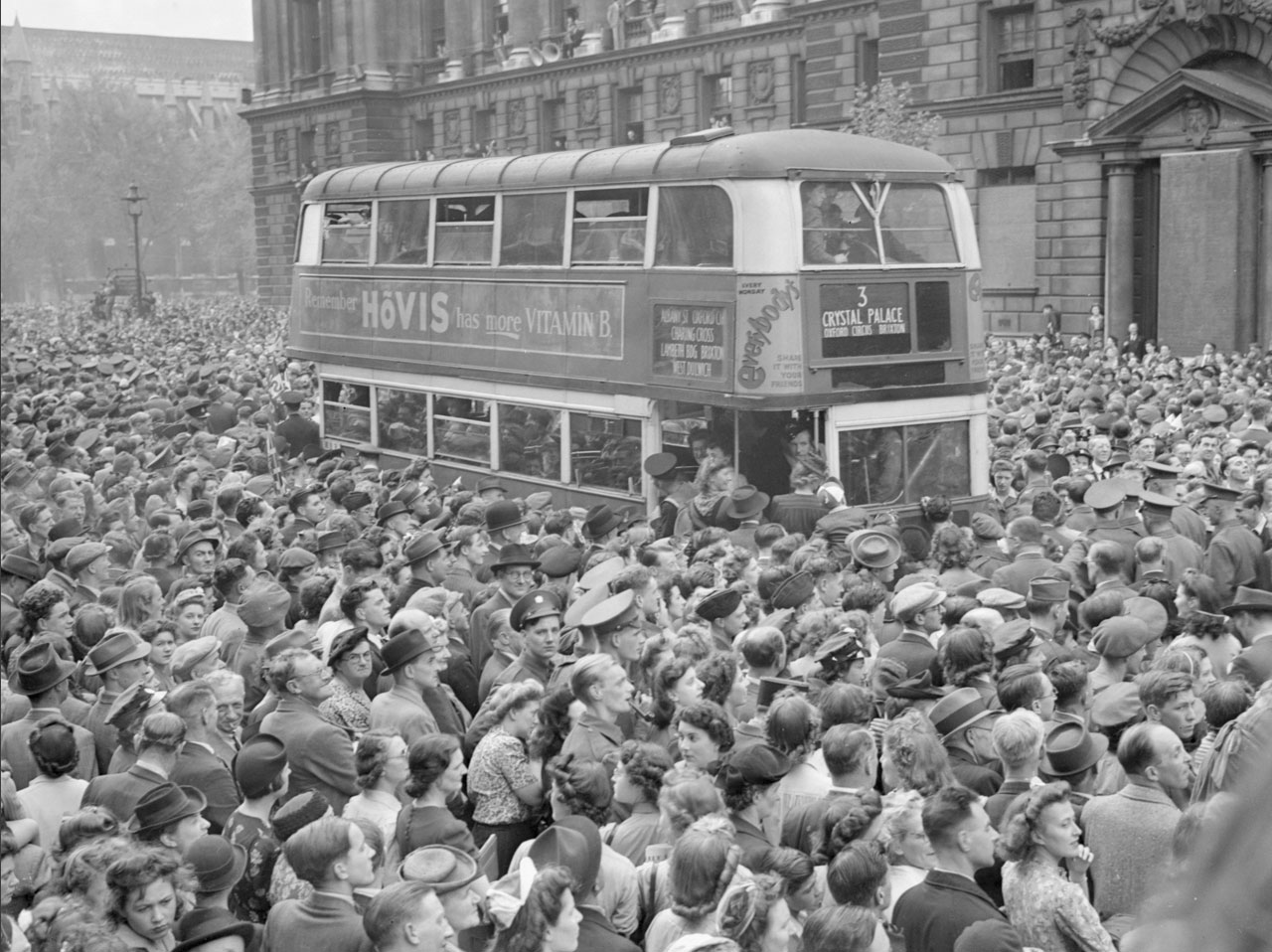
Britons gathered in Whitehall to hear Winston Churchill's victory speech on 8 May 1945.

In 2004, Sir Bernard Crick, political theorist and democratic socialist tasked with developing the life in the United Kingdom test said:

Britishness, to me, is an overarching political and legal concept: it signifies allegiance to the laws, government and broad moral and political concepts—like tolerance and freedom of expression—that hold the United Kingdom together.

Gordon Brown initiated a debate on British identity in 2006. Brown's speech to the Fabian Society's Britishness Conference proposed that British values demand a new constitutional settlement and symbols to represent a modern patriotism, including a new youth community service scheme and a British Day to celebrate. One of the central issues identified at the Fabian Society conference was how the English identity fits within the framework of a devolved United Kingdom. An expression of Her Majesty's Government's initiative to promote Britishness was the inaugural Veterans' Day which was first held on 27 June 2006. As well as celebrating the achievements of armed forces veterans, Brown's speech at the first event for the celebration said:

Scots and people from the rest of the UK share the purpose that Britain has something to say to the rest of the world about the values of freedom, democracy and the dignity of the people that you stand up for. So at a time when people can talk about football and devolution and money, it is important that we also remember the values that we share in common.

In 2018, the Windrush scandal illustrated complex developments in British peoplehood, when it was revealed hundreds of Britons had been wrongfully deported. With roots in the break-up of the empire, and post-war rebuilding; the Windrush generation had arrived as CUKC citizens in the 1950s and 1960s. Born in former British colonies, they settled in the UK before 1973, and were granted "right of abode" by the Immigration Act 1971. Having faced removal, or been deported, many British people of African Caribbean heritage suffered with loss of home, livelihood, and health. As a result of the political scandal, many institutions and elected politicians publicly affirmed that these individuals, while not legally holding British citizenship or nationality, were, in fact, British people. These included British Prime Minister Theresa May, London Mayor Sadiq Khan, Her Majesty's CPS Inspectorate Wendy Williams and her House of Commons-ordered Windrush Lessons Learned Review, the Chartered Institute of Housing, Amnesty International, University of Oxford's social geographer Danny Dorling, and other public figures.

== Geographic distribution ==
Map of the British diaspora in the world by population (includes people with British ancestry or citizenship): United Kingdom + 10,000,000 + 1,000,000 + 100,000 + 10,000

The earliest migrations of Britons date from the 5th and 6th centuries AD, when Brittonic Celts fleeing the Anglo-Saxon invasions migrated what is today northern France and north western Spain and forged the colonies of Brittany and Britonia. Brittany remained independent of France until the early 16th century and still retains a distinct Brittonic culture and language, whilst Britonia in modern Galicia was absorbed into Spanish states by the end of the 9th century AD.

Britons – people with British citizenship or of British descent – have a significant presence in a number of countries other than the United Kingdom, and in particular in those with historic connections to the British Empire. After the Age of Discovery, the British were one of the earliest and largest communities to emigrate out of Europe, and the British Empire's expansion during the first half of the 19th century triggered an "extraordinary dispersion of the British people", resulting in particular concentrations "in Australasia and North America".

The British Empire was "built on waves of migration overseas by British people", who left the United Kingdom and "reached across the globe and permanently affected population structures in three continents". As a result of the British colonisation of the Americas, what became the United States was "easily the greatest single destination of emigrant British", but in Australia the British experienced a birth rate higher than "anything seen before", resulting in the displacement of indigenous Australians.

In colonies such as Southern Rhodesia, British East Africa and Cape Colony, permanently resident British communities were established and, whilst never more than a numerical minority, these Britons "exercised a dominant influence" upon the culture and politics of those lands. In Australia, Canada and New Zealand, "people of British origin came to constitute the majority of the population", contributing to these states becoming integral to the Anglosphere.

The 1861 United Kingdom census estimated the size of the overseas British to be around 2.5 million, but concluded that most of these were "not conventional settlers" but rather "travellers, merchants, professionals, and military personnel". By 1890, there were over 1.5 million further UK-born people living in Australia, Canada, New Zealand and South Africa. A 2006 publication from the Institute for Public Policy Research estimated 5.6 million Britons lived outside of the United Kingdom.

Outside of the United Kingdom and its Overseas Territories, up to 76% of Australians, 70% of New Zealanders, 48% of Canadians, 33% of Americans, 4% of Chileans and 3% of South Africans have ancestry from the British Isles. Hong Kong has the highest proportion of British nationals outside of the United Kingdom and its Overseas Territories, with 47% of Hong Kong residents holding a British National (Overseas) status or a British citizenship. The next highest concentrations of British citizens outside of the United Kingdom and its Overseas Territories are located in Barbados (10%), the Republic of Ireland (7%), Australia (6%) and New Zealand (5%).

=== Australia ===
The flag of Australia was approved by Australian and British authorities, and features a Union Flag—the flag of the United Kingdom—in the canton. Australia has one of the largest concentrations of people of British heritage.

From the beginning of Australia's colonial period until after the Second World War, people from the United Kingdom made up a large majority of people coming to Australia, meaning that many people born in Australia can trace their origins to Britain. The colony of New South Wales, founded on 26 January 1788, was part of the eastern half of Australia claimed by the Kingdom of Great Britain in 1770, and initially settled by Britons through penal transportation. Together with another five largely self-governing Crown Colonies, the federation of Australia was achieved on 1 January 1901.

Its history of British dominance meant that Australia was "grounded in British culture and political traditions that had been transported to the Australian colonies in the nineteenth century and become part of colonial culture and politics". Australia maintains the Westminster system of parliamentary government and Charles III as King of Australia. Until 1987, the national status of Australian citizens was formally described as "British Subject: Citizen of Australia". Britons continue to make up a substantial proportion of immigrants.

By 1947, Australia was fundamentally British in origin with 7,524,129 or 99.3% of the population declaring themselves as European. In the 2016 census, a large proportion of Australians self-identified with British ancestral origins, including 36.1% or 7,852,224 as English and 9.3% (2,023,474) as Scottish alone. A substantial proportion —33.5%— chose to identify as 'Australian', the census Bureau has stated that most of these are of Anglo-Celtic colonial stock. All six states of Australia retain the Union Jack in the canton of their respective flags.

=== British Overseas Territories ===
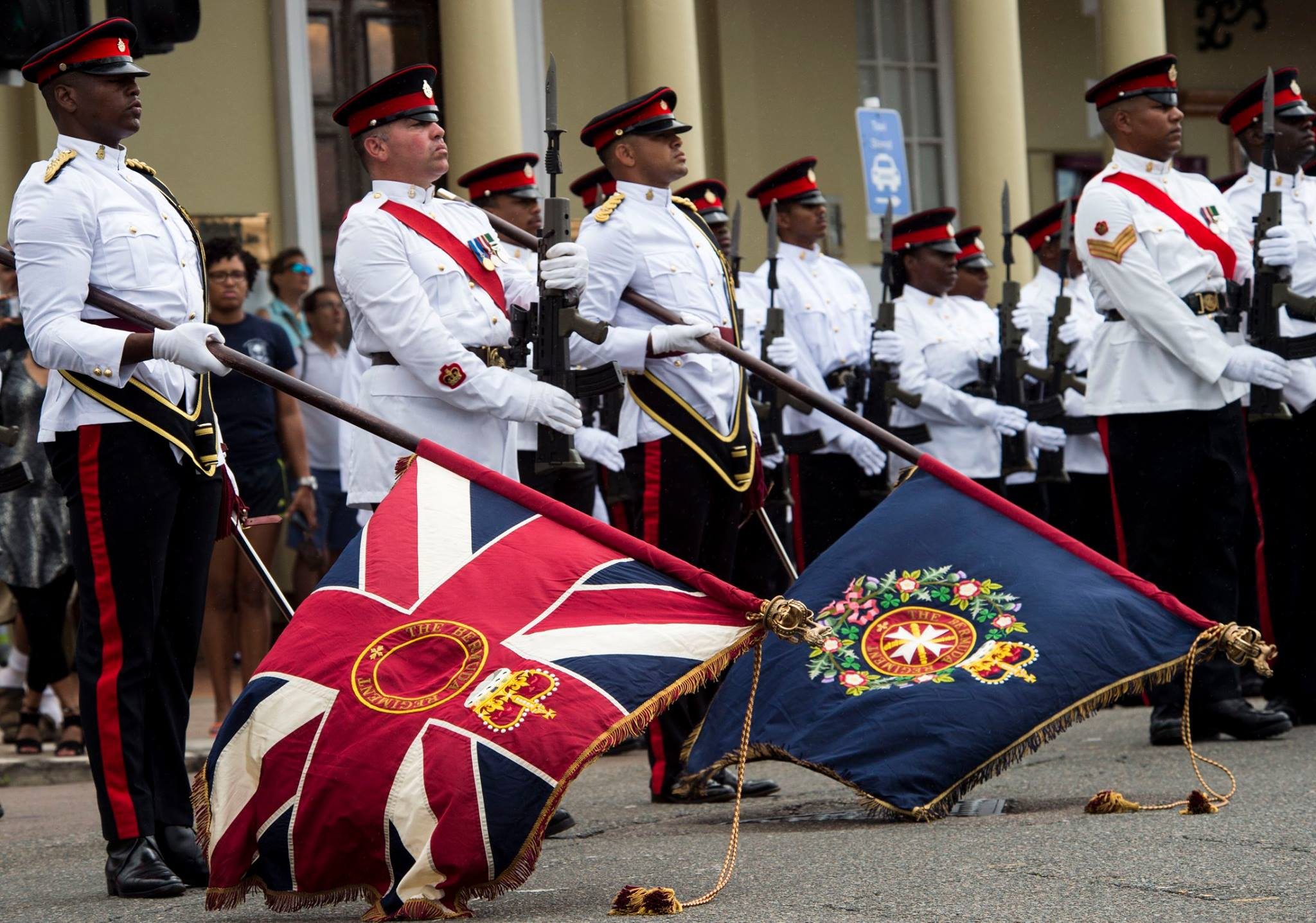
Colour party of the Royal Bermuda Regiment at the Queen's Birthday Parade in Bermuda on 10 June 2017

The approximately 250,000 people of the British Overseas Territories are British by citizenship, via origins or naturalisation. Along with aspects of common British identity, each of the territories has its own distinct identity shaped in its own political, economic, ethnic, social and cultural history. For instance, in the case of the Falkland Islanders, a former Speaker of the Legislative Council of the Falkland Islands, Lewis Clifton, explains:

British cultural, economic, social, political and educational values create a unique British-like, Falkland Islands. Yet Islanders feel distinctly different from their fellow citizens who reside in the United Kingdom. This might have something to do with geographical isolation or with living on a smaller island—perhaps akin to those Britons not feeling European.

In contrast, for the majority of the Gibraltarians, who live in Gibraltar, there is an "insistence on their Britishness" which "carries excessive loyalty" to Britain. The sovereignty of Gibraltar has been a point of contention in Spain–United Kingdom relations, but an overwhelming number of Gibraltarians embrace Britishness with strong conviction, in direct opposition to Spanish territorial claims.

=== Canada ===
The Canadian Red Ensign was the flag of Canada pre-1965, and features a Union Flag—the flag of the United Kingdom—in the canton. Canada has a large concentration of people of British heritage.

Canada traces its statehood to the French, English, and Scottish expeditions of North America from the late-15th century. France ceded nearly all of New France in 1763 after the Seven Years' War, and so after the United States Declaration of Independence in 1776, Quebec and Nova Scotia formed "the nucleus of the colonies that constituted Britain's remaining stake on the North American continent". British North America (the archipelago of Bermuda and those continental colonies remaining after the independence of the thirteen that would become the United States) attracted the United Empire Loyalists, Britons who migrated out of what they considered the "rebellious" United States, increasing the size of British communities in what was to become Canada.

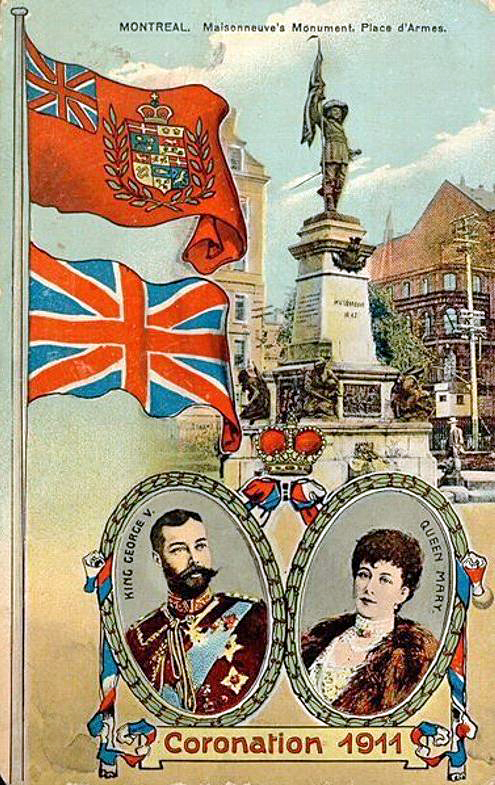
Canadian postcard commemorating the Coronation of King George V, 1911

In 1867 there was a union of three colonies of British North America, the Province of Canada, Nova Scotia, and New Brunswick, which together formed the Canadian Confederation, a federal dominion. This began an accretion of additional provinces and territories and a process of increasing autonomy from the United Kingdom, highlighted by the Statute of Westminster 1931 and culminating in the Canada Act 1982, which severed the vestiges of legal dependence on the parliament of the United Kingdom. Nevertheless, it is recognised that there is a "continuing importance of Canada's long and close relationship with Britain"; large parts of Canada's modern population claim "British origins" and the British cultural impact upon Canada's institutions is profound.

It was not until 1977 that the phrase "A Canadian citizen is a British subject" ceased to be used in Canadian passports. The politics of Canada are strongly influenced by British political culture. Although significant modifications have been made, Canada is governed by a democratic parliamentary framework comparable to the Westminster system, and retains Charles III as King of Canada and head of state. English is the most commonly spoken language used in Canada and it is an official language of Canada.

British iconography remains present in the design of many Canadian flags, most notably in the flags of Ontario and Manitoba. With 10 out of 13 Canadian provincial and territorial flags adopting some form of British symbolism in their design. The Union Jack is also an official ceremonial flag in Canada, known as the Royal Union Flag, which is flown outside of federal buildings three days of the year.

=== New Zealand ===
The flag of New Zealand features a Union Flag—the flag of the United Kingdom—in the canton. A referendum held in 2016 found that 57% of New Zealand voters wanted to retain the current design of the New Zealand flag.

As a long-term result of James Cook's voyage of 1768–1771, a significant number of New Zealanders are of British descent, for whom a sense of Britishness has contributed to their identity. As late as the 1950s, it was common for British New Zealanders to refer to themselves as British, such as when Prime Minister Keith Holyoake described Sir Edmund Hillary's successful ascent of Mount Everest as putting "the British race and New Zealand on top of the world". New Zealand passports described nationals as "British Subject: Citizen of New Zealand" until 1974, when this was changed to "New Zealand citizen".

In an interview with the New Zealand Listener in 2006, Don Brash, the then Leader of the Opposition, said:

British immigrants fit in here very well. My own ancestry is all British. New Zealand values are British values, derived from centuries of struggle since Magna Carta. Those things make New Zealand the society it is.

The politics of New Zealand are strongly influenced by British political culture. Although significant modifications have been made, New Zealand is governed by a democratic parliamentary framework comparable to the Westminster system, and it retains Charles III as the head of the monarchy of New Zealand. English is the dominant official language used in New Zealand.

=== Hong Kong ===
British nationality law as it pertains to Hong Kong has been unusual ever since Hong Kong became a British colony in 1842. From its beginning as a sparsely populated trading port to its modern role as a cosmopolitan international financial centre of over seven million people, the territory has attracted refugees, immigrants and expatriates alike searching for a new life. Citizenship matters were complicated by the fact that British nationality law treated those born in Hong Kong as British subjects (Citizens of the United Kingdom and Colonies from 1948) based on the principle of jus soli, while the People's Republic of China (PRC) did not recognise the ethnically Chinese population in Hong Kong as such.

The main reason was that recognising these British-born nationals would have been seen as a tacit acceptance of a series of historical treaties labelled by the PRC as "unequal", including the ones that ceded Hong Kong Island (Treaty of Nanking) and Kowloon Peninsula (Convention of Peking) to Britain and the New Territories lease. The British government, however, recognising the unique political situation of Hong Kong, granted 3.4 million Hongkongers a new class of British nationality known as British National (Overseas), which is established in accordance with the Hong Kong Act 1985. Some of those also have British citizenship in conjunction with their British National (Overseas) citizenship. Both British Nationals (Overseas) and British citizens are British nationals and Commonwealth citizens according to the British Nationality Law, which enables them to various rights in the United Kingdom.

=== United States ===
An English presence in North America began with the Roanoke Colony and Colony of Virginia in the late-16th century, but the first successful English settlement was established in 1607, on the James River at Jamestown. By the 1610s an estimated 1,300 English people had travelled to North America, the "first of many millions from the British Isles". In 1620, the Pilgrims established the English imperial venture of Plymouth Colony, beginning "a remarkable acceleration of permanent emigration from England" with over 60% of trans-Atlantic English migrants settling in the New England Colonies. During the 17th century, an estimated 350,000 English and Welsh migrants arrived in North America, which in the century after the Acts of Union 1707 was surpassed in rate and number by Scottish and Irish migrants.

The British policy of salutary neglect for its North American colonies intended to minimise trade restrictions as a way of ensuring that they stayed loyal to British interests. This permitted the development of the American Dream, a cultural spirit distinct from that of its European founders. The Thirteen Colonies of British America began an armed rebellion against British rule in 1775 when they rejected the right of the Parliament of Great Britain to govern them without representation; they proclaimed their independence in 1776, and constituted the first thirteen states of the United States of America, which became a sovereign state in 1781 with the ratification of the Articles of Confederation. The 1783 Treaty of Paris represented Great Britain's formal acknowledgement of the United States' sovereignty at the end of the American Revolutionary War.

Nevertheless, longstanding cultural and historical ties have, in more modern times, resulted in the Special Relationship, the historically close political, diplomatic, and military co-operation between the United Kingdom and United States. Linda Colley, a professor of history at Princeton University and specialist in Britishness, suggested that because of their colonial influence on the United States, the British find Americans a "mysterious and paradoxical people, physically distant but culturally close, engagingly similar yet irritatingly different".

For over two centuries of early U.S. history, all Presidents with the exception of two (Van Buren and Kennedy) were descended from the varied colonial British stock, from the Pilgrims and Puritans to the Scotch-Irish and English who settled the Appalachia. The largest concentrations of self-reported British ethnic ancestry in the United States were found to be in Utah (35%), Maine (30%), New Hampshire (25%) and Vermont (25%) at the 2015 American Community Survey. Overall, 10.7% of Americans reported their ethnic ancestry as some form of "British" in the 2013–17 ACS, behind German and African ancestries and on par with Mexican and Irish ancestries.

=== Chile ===
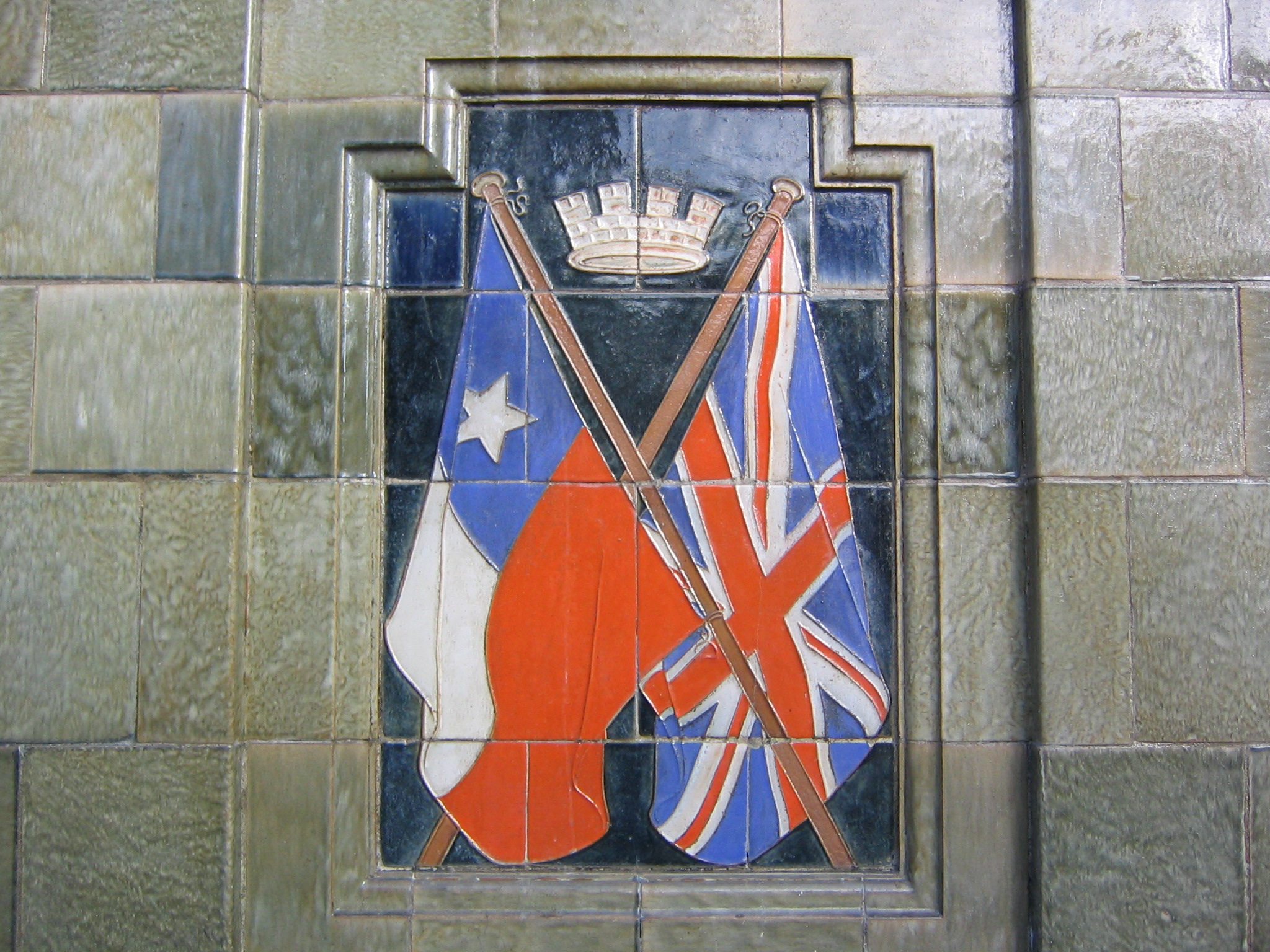
British and Chilean flags in a monument in Antofagasta city

Coat of arms of Coquimbo, with the Union Flag

Approximately 4% of Chile's population is of British or Irish descent. Over 50,000 British immigrants settled in Chile from 1840 to 1914. A significant number of them settled in Magallanes Province, especially in the city of Punta Arenas when it flourished as a major global seaport for ships crossing between the Atlantic and Pacific Oceans through the Strait of Magellan. Around 32,000 English settled in Valparaíso, influencing the port city to the extent of making it virtually a British colony during the last decades of the 19th century and the beginning of the 20th century. However, the opening of the Panama Canal in 1914 and the outbreak of the First World War drove many of them away from the city or back to Europe.

In Valparaíso, they created their largest and most important colony, bringing with them neighbourhoods of British character, schools, social clubs, sports clubs, business organisations and periodicals. Even today, their influence is apparent in specific areas, such as the banks and the navy, as well as in certain social activities, such as football, horse racing and the custom of drinking tea.

During the movement for Chilean independence (1818), it was mainly the British who formed the Chilean Navy, under the command of Lord Cochrane. British investment helped Chile become prosperous and British seamen helped the Chilean navy become a strong force in the South Pacific. Chile won two wars, the first against the Peru-Bolivian Confederation, and the second, the War of the Pacific, in 1878–79, against an alliance between Peru and Bolivia. The liberal-socialist "Revolution of 1891" introduced political reforms modelled on British parliamentary practice and lawmaking.

British immigrants were also important in the northern zone of the country during the saltpetre boom, in the ports of Iquique and Pisagua. The "King of Saltpetre", John Thomas North, was the principal tycoon of nitrate mining. The British legacy is reflected in the streets of the historic district of the city of Iquique, with the foundation of various institutions, such as the Club Hípico (Racing Club). Nevertheless, the British active presence came to an end with the saltpetre crisis during the 1930s.

Some Scots settled in the country's more temperate regions, where the climate and the forested landscape with glaciers and islands may have reminded them of their homeland (the Highlands and Northern Scotland), while English and Welsh made up the rest. The Irish immigrants, who were frequently confused with the British, arrived as merchants, tradesmen and sailors, settling along with the British in the main trading cities and ports. An important contingent of British (principally Welsh) immigrants arrived between 1914 and 1950, settling in the present-day region of Magallanes. British families were established in other areas of the country, such as Santiago, Coquimbo, the Araucanía and Chiloé.

The cultural legacy of the British in Chile is notable and has spread beyond the British Chilean community into society at large. Customs taken from the British include afternoon tea (called onces by Chileans), football, rugby union and horse racing. Another legacy is the widespread use of British personal names by Chileans. Chile has the largest population of descendants of British settlers in Latin America. Over 700,000 Chileans may have British (English, Scottish and Welsh) origin, amounting to 4.5% of Chile's population.

=== South Africa ===
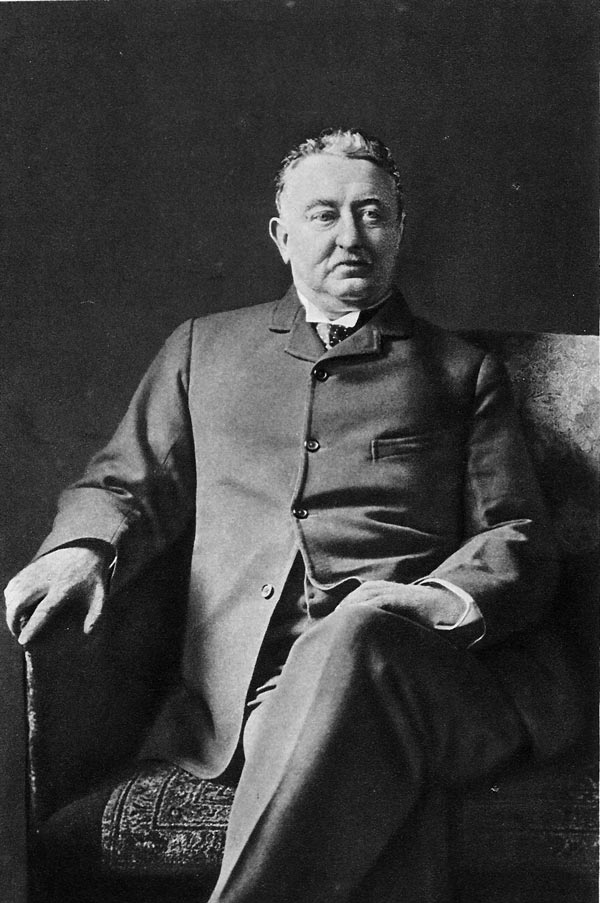
Cecil John Rhodes, the 6th Prime Minister of the Cape Colony (divided between two provinces in modern-day South Africa) and founder of the De Beers diamond company

The British arrived in the area which would become the modern-day South Africa during the early 18th century, yet substantial settlement only started end of the 18th century, in the Cape of Good Hope. In the late 19th century, the discovery of gold and diamonds further encouraged colonisation of South Africa by the British, and the population of the British-South Africans rose substantially, although there was fierce rivalry between the British and Afrikaners (descendants of Dutch colonists) in the period known as the Boer Wars. The latest census in South Africa showed that there are almost 2 million British-South Africans; they make up about 40% of the total White South African demographic, and the greatest white British ancestry populations in South Africa are in the KwaZulu-Natal province and in the cities of Cape Town, Durban and Port Elizabeth.

=== Ireland ===
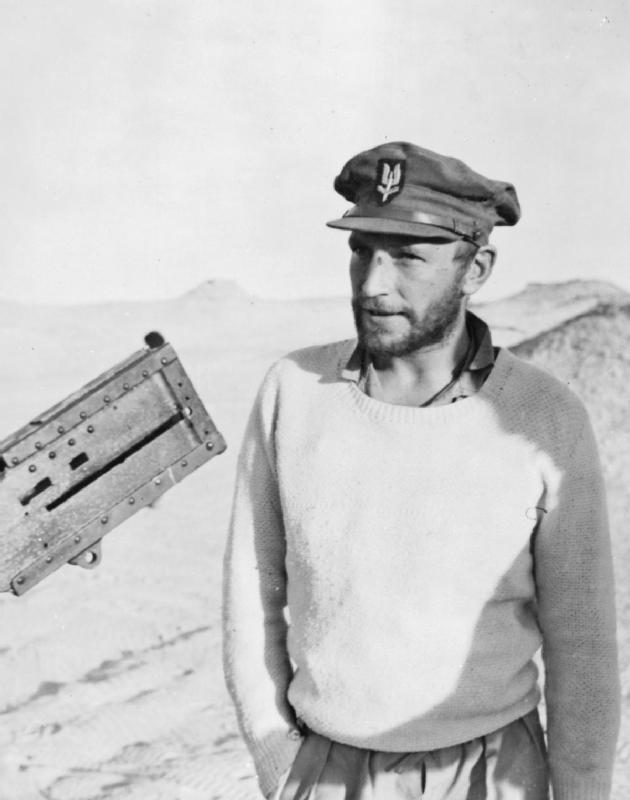
Paddy Mayne from County Down; a founding member of the SAS; was one of the most decorated British soldiers of World War II. He also played rugby for Ireland.

Plantations of Ireland introduced large numbers of people from Great Britain to Ireland throughout the Middle Ages and early modern period. The resulting Protestant Ascendancy, the aristocratic class of the Lordship of Ireland, broadly identified themselves as Anglo-Irish. In the sixteenth and seventeenth centuries, Protestant British settlers subjugated Catholic, Gaelic inhabitants in the north of Ireland during the Plantation of Ulster and the Williamite War in Ireland; it was "an explicit attempt to control Ireland strategically by introducing ethnic and religious elements loyal to the British interest in Ireland".

The Ulster Scots people are an ethnic group of British origin in Ireland, broadly descended from Lowland Scots who settled in large numbers in the province of Ulster during the planned process of colonisations of Ireland which took place in the reign of James VI of Scotland and I of England. Together with English and Welsh settlers, these Scots introduced Protestantism (particularly the Presbyterianism of the Church of Scotland) and the Ulster Scots and English languages to, mainly, northeastern Ireland. With the partition of Ireland and independence for what is now the Republic of Ireland some of these people found themselves no longer living within the United Kingdom.

Northern Ireland itself was, for many years, the site of a violent and bitter ethno-sectarian conflict—The Troubles—between those claiming to represent Irish nationalism, who are predominantly Roman Catholic, and those claiming to represent British unionism, who are predominantly Protestant. Unionists want Northern Ireland to remain part of the United Kingdom, while nationalists desire a united Ireland.

Since the signing of the Good Friday Agreement in 1998, most of the paramilitary groups involved in the Troubles have ceased their armed campaigns, and constitutionally, the people of Northern Ireland have been recognised as "all persons born in Northern Ireland and having, at the time of their birth, at least one parent who is a British citizen, an Irish citizen or is otherwise entitled to reside in Northern Ireland without any restriction on their period of residence". The Good Friday Agreement guarantees the "recognition of the birthright of all the people of Northern Ireland to identify themselves and be accepted as Irish or British, or both, as they may so choose".

== Culture ==
Result from the expansion of the British Empire, British cultural influence can be observed in the language and culture of a geographically wide assortment of countries such as Canada, Australia, New Zealand, South Africa, India, Pakistan, the United States, and the British overseas territories. These states are sometimes collectively known as the Anglosphere. As well as the British influence on its empire, the empire also influenced British culture, particularly British cuisine. Innovations and movements within the wider-culture of Europe have also changed the United Kingdom; Humanism, Protestantism, and representative democracy have developed from broader Western culture. As a result of the history of the formation of the United Kingdom, the cultures of England, Scotland, Wales, and Northern Ireland are diverse and have varying degrees of overlap and distinctiveness.

=== Cuisine ===
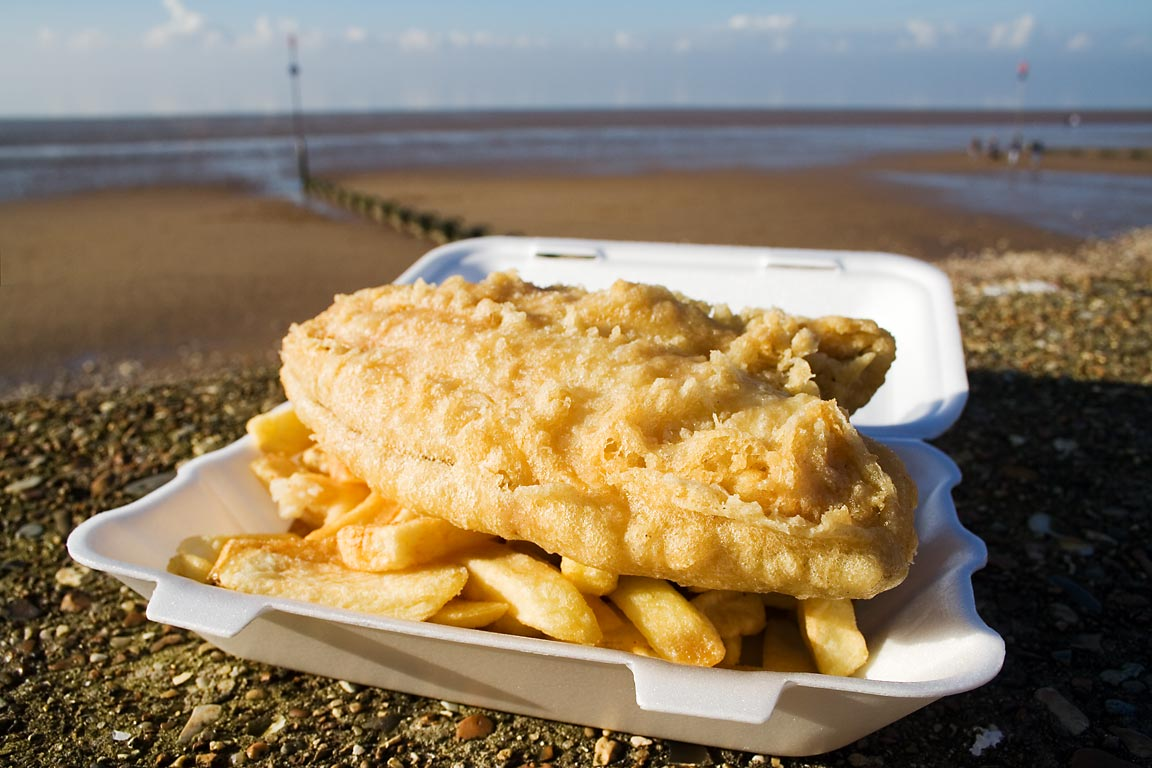
Fish and chips, a popular take-away food throughout the United Kingdom, has been described as the quintessential British dish.

Historically, British cuisine has meant "unfussy dishes made with quality local ingredients, matched with simple sauces to accentuate flavour, rather than disguise it". It has been "vilified as unimaginative and heavy", and traditionally been limited in its international recognition to the full breakfast and the Christmas dinner. This is despite British cuisine having absorbed the culinary influences of those who have settled in Britain, resulting in hybrid dishes such as the British Asian Chicken tikka masala, hailed by some as "Britain's true national dish".

Celtic agriculture and animal breeding produced a wide variety of foodstuffs for Celts and Britons. The Anglo-Saxons developed meat and savoury herb stewing techniques before the practice became common in Europe. The Norman conquest of England introduced exotic spices into Britain in the Middle Ages. The British Empire facilitated a knowledge of India's food tradition of "strong, penetrating spices and herbs". Food rationing policies, imposed by the British government during wartime periods of the 20th century, are said to have been the stimulus for British cuisine's poor international reputation.

British dishes include fish and chips, the Sunday roast, and bangers and mash. British cuisine has several national and regional varieties, including English, Scottish and Welsh cuisine, each of which has developed its own regional or local dishes, many of which are geographically indicated foods such as Cheddar cheese, Cheshire cheese, the Yorkshire pudding, Arbroath Smokie, Cornish pasty and Welsh cakes.

The British are the second largest per capita tea consumers in the world, consuming an average of 2.1 kilograms (4.6 lb) per person each year. British tea culture dates back to the 19th century, when India was part of the British Empire and British interests controlled tea production in the subcontinent.

=== Languages ===
There is no single British language, though English is by far the main language spoken by British citizens, being spoken monolingually by more than 70% of the UK population. English is therefore the de facto official language of the United Kingdom. However, under the European Charter for Regional or Minority Languages, the Welsh, Scottish Gaelic, Cornish, Irish Gaelic, Ulster Scots, Manx and Scots languages are officially recognised as Regional or Minority languages by the UK Government. Insular varieties of Norman are recognised languages of the Bailiwicks of Jersey and Guernsey, although they are dying. Standard French is an official language of both bailiwicks.

As indigenous languages which continue to be spoken as a first language by native inhabitants, Welsh and Scottish Gaelic have a different legal status from other minority languages. In some parts of the UK, some of these languages are commonly spoken as a first language; in wider areas, their use in a bilingual context is sometimes supported or promoted by central or local government policy. For naturalisation purposes, a competence standard of English, Scottish Gaelic or Welsh is required to pass the life in the United Kingdom test. However, English is used routinely, and although considered culturally important, Scottish Gaelic and Welsh are much less used.

Throughout the United Kingdom there are distinctive spoken expressions and regional accents of English, which are seen to be symptomatic of a locality's culture and identity. An awareness and knowledge of accents in the United Kingdom can "place, within a few miles, the locality in which a man or woman has grown up".

=== Literature ===
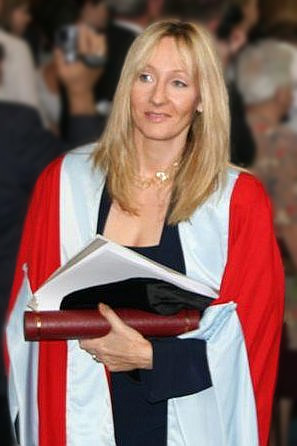
J.K. Rowling is one of the world's best selling British authors. Her Harry Potter series of books have sold more than 400 million copies worldwide.

British literature is "one of the leading literatures in the world". The overwhelming part is written in the English language, but there are also pieces of literature written in Scots, Scottish Gaelic, Ulster Scots, Cornish and Welsh.

Britain has a long history of famous and influential authors. It boasts some of the oldest pieces of literature in the Western world, such as the epic poem Beowulf, one of the oldest surviving written work in the English language. Prior to the formation of British nationhood, famous authors who inhabited Great Britain include some of the world's most studied and praised writers. In England, the playwrights William Shakespeare and Christopher Marlowe defined England's Elizabethan period.

The British Romantic movement was one of the strongest and most recognisable in Europe. The poets William Blake, Robert Burns, Wordsworth and Coleridge were amongst the pioneers of Romanticism in literature. Other Romantic writers that followed these figure further enhanced the profile of Romanticism in Europe, such as John Keats, Percy Bysshe Shelley and Lord Byron. Later periods like the Victorian Era saw a further flourishing of British writing, including Charles Dickens and William Thackeray.

Women's literature in Britain has had a long and often troubled history, with many female writers producing work under a pen name, such as George Eliot. Other great female novelists that have contributed to world literature are Frances Burney, Frances Hodgson Burnett, Virginia Woolf, Jane Austen and the Brontë sisters, Emily, Charlotte and Anne.

Non-fiction has also played an important role in the history of British letters, with the first dictionary of the English language being produced and compiled by Samuel Johnson, a graduate of Oxford University and a London resident.

=== Media and music ===
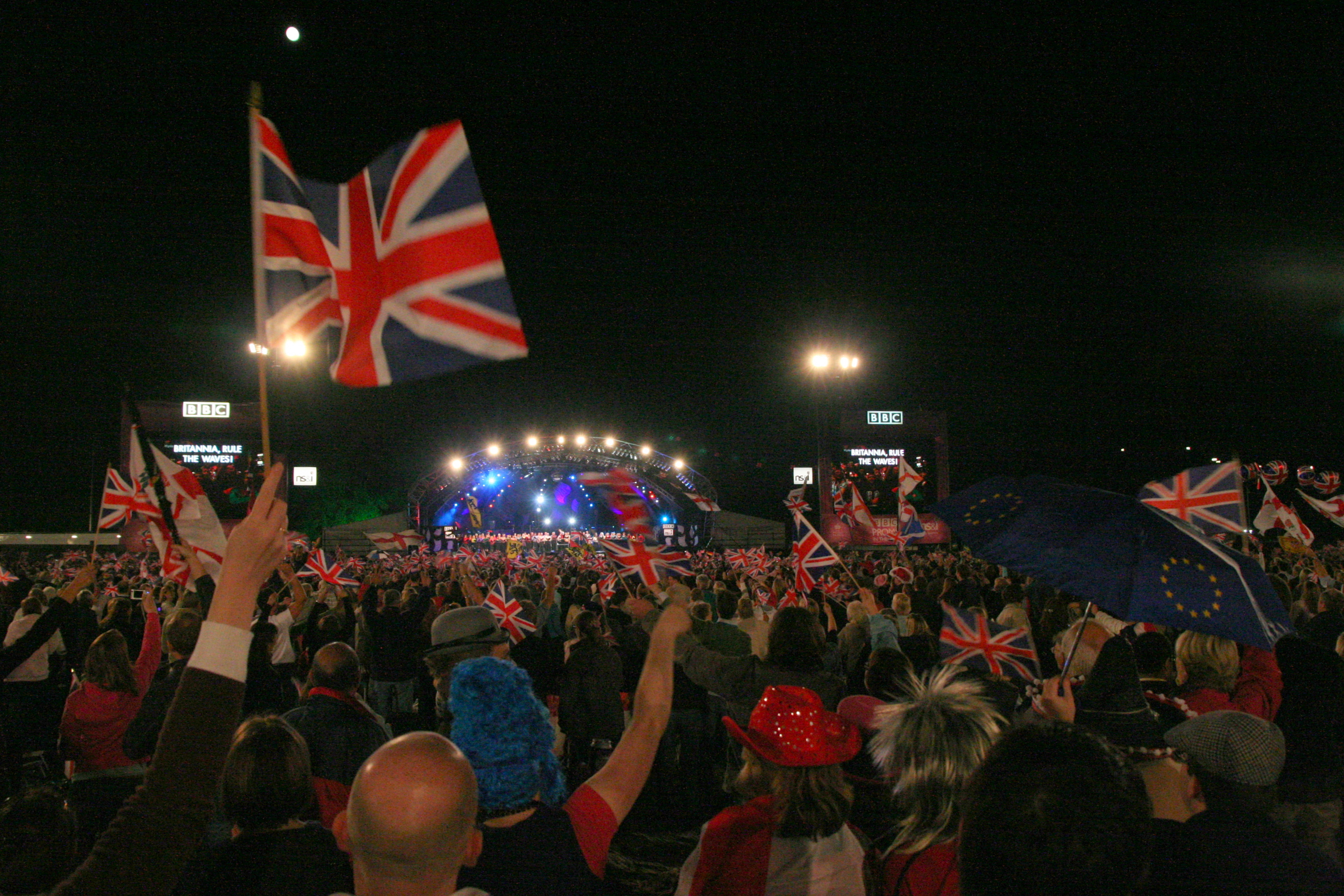
The Proms is an eight-week summer season of daily orchestral classical music concerts held across the United Kingdom. The Last Night of the Proms celebrates British tradition with patriotic classical music of the United Kingdom.

Although cinema, theatre, dance and live music are popular, the favourite pastime of the British is watching television. Public broadcast television in the United Kingdom began in 1936, with the launch of the BBC Television Service (now BBC One). In the United Kingdom and the Crown dependencies, one must have a television licence to legally receive any broadcast television service, from any source. This includes the commercial channels, cable and satellite transmissions, and the Internet. Revenue generated from the television licence is used to provide radio, television and Internet content for the British Broadcasting Corporation, and Welsh language television programmes for S4C. The BBC, the common abbreviation of the British Broadcasting Corporation, is the world's largest broadcaster. Unlike other broadcasters in the UK, it is a public service based, quasi-autonomous, statutory corporation run by the BBC Trust. Free-to-air terrestrial television channels available on a national basis are BBC One, BBC Two, ITV, Channel 4 (S4C in Wales), and Five.

100 Greatest British Television Programmes was a list compiled by the British Film Institute in 2000, chosen by a poll of industry professionals, to determine what were the greatest British television programmes of any genre ever to have been screened. Topping the list was Fawlty Towers, a British sitcom set in a fictional Torquay hotel starring John Cleese.

"British musical tradition is essentially vocal", dominated by the music of England and Germanic culture, most greatly influenced by hymns and Anglican church music. However, the specific, traditional music of Wales and music of Scotland is distinct, and of the Celtic musical tradition. In the United Kingdom, more people attend live music performances than football matches. British rock was born in the mid-20th century out of the influence of rock and roll and rhythm and blues from the United States. Major early exports were the Beatles, the Rolling Stones, the Who and the Kinks. Together with other bands from the United Kingdom, these constituted the British Invasion, a popularisation of British pop and rock music in the United States. Into the 1970s heavy metal, new wave, and 2 tone. Britpop is a subgenre of alternative rock that emerged from the British independent music scene of the early 1990s and was characterised by bands reviving British guitar pop music of the 1960s and 1970s. Leading exponents of Britpop were Blur, Oasis and Pulp. Also popularised in the United Kingdom during the 1990s were several domestically produced varieties of electronic dance music; acid house, UK hard house, jungle, UK garage which in turn have influenced grime and British hip hop in the 2000s. The 2020s saw the rise of the UK underground rap scene, which was heavily inspired by American internet rap genres such as cloud rap and jerk. The BRIT Awards are the British Phonographic Industry's annual awards for both international and British popular music.

=== Religion ===
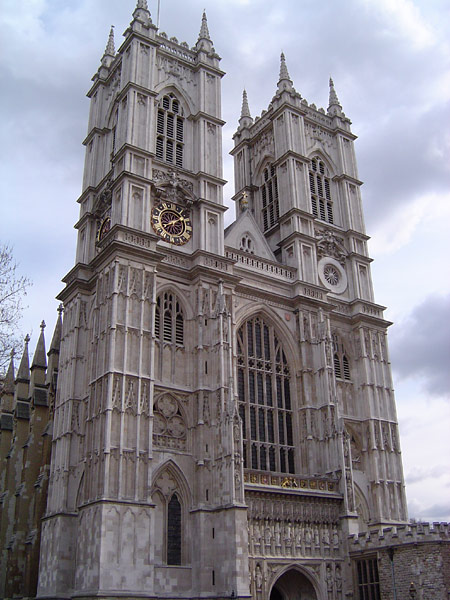
Westminster Abbey is used for the coronation of the British monarchs, who are also made the head of the Church of England.

Historically, Christianity has been the most influential and important religion in Britain, and it remains the declared faith of the majority of the British people. The influence of Christianity on British culture has been "widespread, extending beyond the spheres of prayer and worship. Churches and cathedrals make a significant contribution to the architectural landscape of the nation's cities and towns" whilst "many schools and hospitals were founded by men and women who were strongly influenced by Christian motives". Throughout the United Kingdom, Easter and Christmas, the "two most important events in the Christian calendar", are recognised as public holidays.

Christianity remains the major religion of the population of the United Kingdom in the 21st century, followed by Islam, Hinduism, Sikhism and then Judaism in terms of numbers of adherents. The 2007 Tearfund Survey revealed 53% identified themselves as Christian, which was similar to the 2004 British Social Attitudes Survey, and to the 2001 United Kingdom census in which 71.6% said that Christianity was their religion, However, the Tearfund Survey showed only one in ten Britons attend church weekly. Secularism was advanced in Britain during the Age of Enlightenment, and modern British organisations such as the British Humanist Association and the National Secular Society offer the opportunity for their members to "debate and explore the moral and philosophical issues in a non-religious setting".

The Treaty of Union that led to the formation of the Kingdom of Great Britain ensured that there would be a Protestant succession as well as a link between church and state that still remains. The Church of England (Anglican) is legally recognised as the established church, and so retains representation in the Parliament of the United Kingdom through the Lords Spiritual, whilst the British monarch is a member of the church as well as its Supreme Governor. The Church of England also retains the right to draft legislative measures (related to religious administration) through the General Synod that can then be passed into law by Parliament. The Roman Catholic Church in England and Wales is the second largest Christian church with around five million members, mainly in England. There are also growing Orthodox, Evangelical and Pentecostal churches, with Pentecostal churches in England now third after the Church of England and the Roman Catholic Church in terms of church attendance. Other large Christian groups include Methodists and Baptists.

The Presbyterian Church of Scotland (known informally as The Kirk), is recognised as the national church of Scotland and not subject to state control. The British monarch is an ordinary member and is required to swear an oath to "defend the security" of the church upon his or her accession. The Roman Catholic Church in Scotland is Scotland's second largest Christian church, with followers representing a sixth of the population of Scotland. The Scottish Episcopal Church, which is part of the Anglican Communion, dates from the final establishment of Presbyterianism in Scotland in 1690, when it split from the Church of Scotland over matters of theology and ritual. Further splits in the Church of Scotland, especially in the 19th century, led to the creation of other Presbyterian churches in Scotland, including the Free Church of Scotland. In the 1920s, the Church in Wales became independent from the Church of England and became 'disestablished' but remains in the Anglican Communion. Methodism and other Protestant churches have had a major presence in Wales. The main religious groups in Northern Ireland are organised on an all-Ireland basis. Though collectively Protestants constitute the overall majority, the Roman Catholic Church of Ireland is the largest single church. The Presbyterian Church in Ireland, closely linked to the Church of Scotland in terms of theology and history, is the second largest church followed by the Church of Ireland (Anglican) which was disestablished in the 19th century.

=== Sport ===
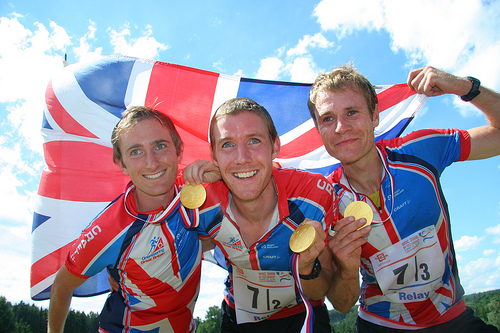
The British gold medalist relay team of the 2008 World Orienteering Championships

Sport is an important element of British culture, and is one of the most popular leisure activities of Britons. Within the United Kingdom, nearly half of all adults partake in one or more sporting activity each week. Some of the major sports in the United Kingdom "were invented by the British", including football, rugby union, rugby league and cricket, and "exported various other games" including tennis, badminton, boxing, golf, snooker and squash.

In most sports, separate organisations, teams and clubs represent the individual countries of the United Kingdom at international level, though in some sports, like rugby union, an all-Ireland team represents both Northern Ireland and Ireland (Republic of), and the British and Irish Lions represent Ireland and Britain as a whole. The UK is represented by a single team at the Olympic Games and at the 2012 Summer Olympics, the Great Britain team won 65 medals: 29 gold (the most since the 1908 Summer Olympics), 17 silver and 19 bronze, ranking them 3rd. In total, sportsmen and women from the UK "hold over 50 world titles in a variety of sports, such as professional boxing, rowing, snooker, squash and motorcycle sports".

A 2006 poll found that association football was the most popular sport in the UK. In England 320 football clubs are affiliated to The Football Association (FA) and more than 42,000 clubs to regional or district associations. The FA, founded in 1863, and the Football League, founded in 1888, were both the first of their kind in the world. In Scotland there are 78 full and associate clubs and nearly 6,000 registered clubs under the jurisdiction of the Scottish Football Association. Two Welsh clubs play in England's Football League and others at non-league level, whilst the Welsh Football League contains 20 semi-professional clubs. In Northern Ireland, 12 semi-professional clubs play in the IFA Premiership, the second oldest league in the world.

Recreational fishing, particularly angling, is one of the most popular participation activities in the United Kingdom, with an estimated 3–4 million anglers in the country. The most widely practised form of angling in England and Wales is for coarse fish while in Scotland angling is usually for salmon and trout.

=== Visual art and architecture ===
For centuries, artists and architects in Britain were overwhelmingly influenced by Western art history. Amongst the first visual artists credited for developing a distinctly British aesthetic and artistic style is William Hogarth. The experience of military, political and economic power from the rise of the British Empire, led to a very specific drive in artistic technique, taste and sensibility in the United Kingdom. Britons used their art "to illustrate their knowledge and command of the natural world", whilst the permanent settlers in British North America, Australasia, and South Africa "embarked upon a search for distinctive artistic expression appropriate to their sense of national identity". The empire has been "at the centre, rather than in the margins, of the history of British art", and imperial British visual arts have been fundamental to the construction, celebration and expression of Britishness.

British attitudes to modern art were "polarised" at the end of the 19th century. Modernist movements were both cherished and vilified by artists and critics; Impressionism was initially regarded by "many conservative critics" as a "subversive foreign influence", but became "fully assimilated" into British art during the early-20th century. Representational art was described by Herbert Read during the interwar period as "necessarily... revolutionary", and was studied and produced to such an extent that by the 1950s, Classicism was effectively void in British visual art. Post-modern, contemporary British art, particularly that of the Young British Artists, has been pre-occupied with postcolonialism, and "characterised by a fundamental concern with material culture ... perceived as a post-imperial cultural anxiety".

Architecture of the United Kingdom is diverse; most influential developments have usually taken place in England, but Ireland, Scotland, and Wales have at various times played leading roles in architectural history. Although there are prehistoric and classical structures in the British Isles, British architecture effectively begins with the first Anglo-Saxon Christian churches, built soon after Augustine of Canterbury arrived in Great Britain in 597. Norman architecture was built on a vast scale from the 11th century onwards in the form of castles and churches to help impose Norman authority upon their dominion. English Gothic architecture, which flourished from 1180 until c. 1520, was initially imported from France, but quickly developed its own unique qualities. Secular medieval architecture throughout Britain has left a legacy of large stone castles, with the "finest examples" being found lining both sides of the Anglo-Scottish border, dating from the Wars of Scottish Independence of the 14th century. The invention of gunpowder and canons made castles redundant, and the English Renaissance which followed facilitated the development of new artistic styles for domestic architecture: Tudor style, English Baroque, The Queen Anne Style and Palladian. Georgian and Neoclassical architecture advanced after the Scottish Enlightenment. Outside the United Kingdom, the influence of British architecture is particularly strong in South India, the result of British rule in India in the 19th century. The Indian cities of Bangalore, Chennai, and Mumbai each have courts, hotels and train stations designed in British architectural styles of Gothic Revivalism and neoclassicism.

=== Political culture ===
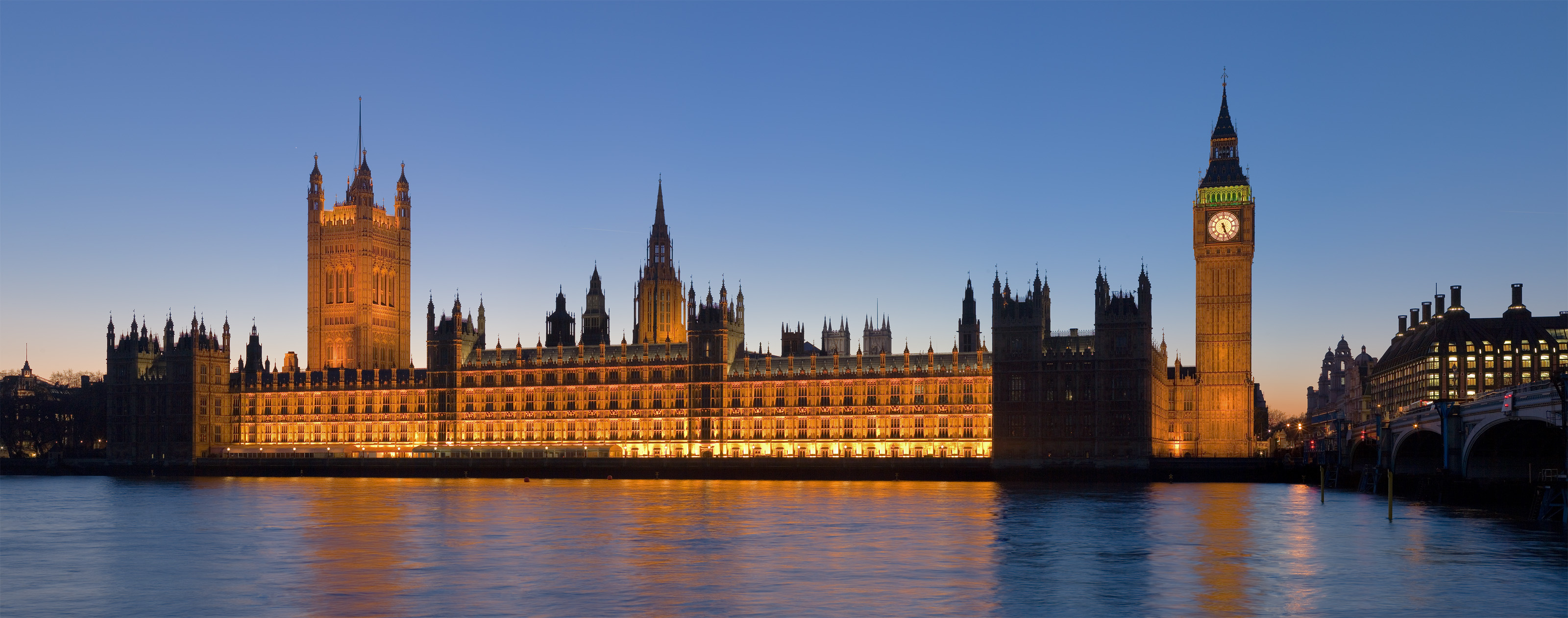
The Palace of Westminster is a UNESCO World Heritage Site which houses the Parliament of the United Kingdom.

British political culture is tied closely with its institutions and civics, and a "subtle fusion of new and old values". The principle of constitutional monarchy, with its notions of stable parliamentary government and political liberalism, "have come to dominate British culture". These views have been reinforced by Sir Bernard Crick who said:

To be British seems to us to mean that we respect the laws, the elected parliamentary and democratic political structures, traditional values of mutual tolerance, respect for equal rights and mutual concern; that we give our allegiance to the state (as commonly symbolised by the Crown) in return for its protection.

British political institutions include the Westminster system, the Commonwealth of Nations and Privy Council of the United Kingdom. Although the Privy Council is primarily a British institution, officials from other Commonwealth realms are also appointed to the body. The most notable continuing instance is the Prime Minister of New Zealand, its senior politicians, Chief Justice and Court of Appeal judges are conventionally made Privy Counsellors, as the prime ministers and chief justices of Canada and Australia used to be. Prime Ministers of Commonwealth countries which retain the British monarch as their sovereign continue to be sworn as Privy Counsellors.

Universal suffrage for all males over 21 was granted in 1918 and for adult women in 1928 after the Suffragette movement. Politics in the United Kingdom is multi-party, with three dominant political parties: the Conservative Party, the Labour Party and the Liberal Democrats. The social structure of Britain, specifically social class, has "long been pre-eminent among the factors used to explain party allegiance", and still persists as "the dominant basis" of party political allegiance for Britons. The Conservative Party is descended from the historic Tory Party (founded in England in 1678), and is a centre-right conservative political party, which traditionally draws support from the middle classes. The Labour Party (founded by Scotsman Keir Hardie) grew out of the trade union movement and socialist political parties of the 19th century, and continues to describe itself as a "democratic socialist party". Labour states that it stands for the representation of the low-paid working class, who have traditionally been its members and voters. The Liberal Democrats are a liberal political party, and third largest in the UK in terms of MPs elected. It is descended from the Liberal Party, a major ruling party of 19th-century UK through to the First World War, when it was supplanted by the Labour Party. The Liberal Democrats have historically drawn support from wide and "differing social backgrounds". The Scottish National Party is the fourth largest political party in the UK in terms of representation in parliament, having won 9 out of 57 Scottish seats at the 2024 General Election. There are over 300 other, smaller political parties in the United Kingdom registered to the Electoral Commission.

== Classification ==
According to the British Social Attitudes Survey, there are broadly two interpretations of British identity, with ethnic and civic dimensions:

The first group, which we term the ethnic dimension, contained the items about birthplace, ancestry, living in Britain, and sharing British customs and traditions. The second, or civic group, contained the items about feeling British, respecting laws and institutions, speaking English, and having British citizenship.

Of the two perspectives of British identity, the civic definition has become "the dominant idea ... by far", and in this capacity, Britishness is sometimes considered an institutional or overarching state identity. This has been used to explain why first-, second- and third-generation immigrants have been (as of 2004) more likely to describe themselves as British, rather than English, because it is an "institutional, inclusive" identity, that can be acquired through naturalisation and British nationality law; the vast majority of people in the United Kingdom who are from an ethnic minority feel British.

However, in 2005 this attitude was more common in England than in Scotland or Wales; "white English people perceived themselves as English first and as British second, and most people from ethnic minority backgrounds perceived themselves as British, but none identified as English, a label they associated exclusively with white people". Contrawise, in Scotland and Wales, White British and ethnic minority people both identified more strongly with Scotland and Wales than with Britain.

Studies and surveys have "reported that the majority of the Scots and Welsh see themselves as both Scottish/Welsh and British though with some differences in emphasis". The Commission for Racial Equality found that with respect to notions of nationality in Britain, "the most basic, objective and uncontroversial conception of the British people is one that includes the English, the Scots and the Welsh". However, "English participants tended to think of themselves as indistinguishably English or British, while both Scottish and Welsh participants identified themselves much more readily as Scottish or Welsh than as British".

Some persons opted "to combine both identities" as "they felt Scottish or Welsh, but held a British passport and were therefore British", whereas others saw themselves as exclusively Scottish or exclusively Welsh and "felt quite divorced from the British, whom they saw as the English". Commentators have described this latter phenomenon as "nationalism", a rejection of British identity because some Scots and Welsh interpret it as "cultural imperialism imposed" upon the United Kingdom by "English ruling elites", or else a response to a historical misappropriation of equating the word "English" with "British", which has "brought about a desire among Scots, Welsh and Irish to learn more about their heritage and distinguish themselves from the broader British identity".

== See also ==
- English people
- Scottish people
- Welsh people
- People of Northern Ireland
- Anti-British sentiment
- Lists of British people
  - 100 Greatest Britons
