= British national identity =

State or quality of embodying British characteristics

The Union Jack, in addition to being the flag of the United Kingdom, also serves as one of the most potent symbols of Britishness.

British national identity is a term referring to the sense of national identity, as embodied in the shared and characteristic culture, languages and traditions, of the British people. It comprises the claimed qualities that bind and distinguish the British people and form the basis of their unity and identity, and the expressions of British culture—such as habits, behaviours, or symbols—that have a common, familiar or iconic quality readily identifiable with the United Kingdom. Dialogue about the legitimacy and authenticity of Britishness is intrinsically tied with power relations and politics; in terms of nationhood and belonging, expressing or recognising one's Britishness provokes a range of responses and attitudes, such as advocacy, indifference, or rejection.

Although the term 'Britishness' "[sprang] into political and academic prominence" only in the late 20th century, its origins lie with the formation of the Kingdom of Great Britain in 1707. It was used with reference to Britons collectively as early as 1682, and the historian Linda Colley asserts that it was after the Acts of Union 1707 that the ethnic groups of Great Britain began to assume a "layered" identity—to think of themselves as simultaneously British but also Scottish, English, and/or Welsh. In this formative period, Britishness was "closely bound up with Protestantism". The Oxford English Dictionary Online dates the first known use of the term Britishness to refer to the state of being British to a June 1857 issue of Putnam's Monthly Magazine.

Since the late 20th century, the exploration and proliferation of Britishness became directly associated with a desire to define, sustain or restore a homogeneous British identity or allegiance to Britain, prompting debate. For instance, the Life in the United Kingdom test—reported as a test of one's Britishness—has been described as controversial. The UK Independence Party have asserted that Britishness is tied with inclusive civic nationalism, whereas the Commission for Racial Equality reported that Scots, Welsh, Irish and ethnic minorities may feel quite divorced from Britishness because of ethnic English dominance; Gwynfor Evans, a Welsh nationalist politician, said that "Britishness is a political synonym for Englishness which extends English culture over the Scots, Welsh, and the Irish." Historians Graham Macphee and Prem Poddar state that Britishness and Englishness are invariably conflated as they are both tied to the identity of the British Empire and UK; slippage between the two words is common. With regard to a proposed oath of allegiance for school leavers, historian David Starkey argued that it is impossible to teach Britishness because "a British nation doesn't exist".

A British identity is more popular in England, while it is a minority identity in the other countries of the United Kingdom. According to the 2021 census, a majority (71.1%) of respondents in England report to have a British identity, while only 26.6% of Wales and 22.1% of Scotland report to have a British identity, most choosing Welsh or Scottish respectively instead. 31.9% of the population of Northern Ireland chose a British identity, compared to 29.1% Irish and 19.8% Northern Irish.

== Government perspective ==
Gordon Brown, then Chancellor of the Exchequer, made a speech in 2006 to promote the idea of Britishness. Brown's speech to the Fabian Society's Britishness Conference proposed that British values demand a new constitutional settlement and symbols to represent a modern patriotism, including a new youth community service scheme and a 'British Day' to celebrate.

One of the central issues identified at the Fabian Society conference was how the English identity fits within the framework of a devolved UK. Does England require a new constitutional settlement for instance?

The British government has sought to promote Britishness with the inaugural Veterans' Day (now called Armed Forces Day), first held on 27 June 2006. As well as celebrating the achievements of members of the armed forces, at the first event for the celebration Brown said:

Scots and people from the rest of the UK share the purpose —that Britain has something to say to the rest of the world about the values of freedom, democracy, and the dignity of the people that you stand up for. So at a time when people can talk about football and devolution and money, it is important that we also remember the values that we share in common.

Critics have argued that Brown's sudden interest in the subject had more to do with countering English opposition to a Scottish Member of Parliament becoming prime minister.

In November 2007, The Times newspaper's Comment Central asked readers to define Britishness in five little words. The winning suggestion was "No motto please, we're British".

A duty to promote democracy forms a key part of the "duty to actively promote fundamental British values in schools" in the United Kingdom in accordance with section 78 of the Education Act 2002. According to the Department for Education's advice for maintained schools in 2014, "Schools should promote the fundamental British values of democracy, the rule of law, individual liberty, and mutual respect and tolerance of those with different faiths and beliefs". The Government's Prevent strategy of 2011 was cited as the source of this list of values, but that strategy also contained a slightly different list: "democracy, rule of law, equality of opportunity, freedom of speech and the rights of all men and women to live free from persecution of any kind." The 2018 version of the CONTEST strategy codified the list as:

- the rule of law
- individual liberty
- democracy
- mutual respect, tolerance and understanding of different faiths and beliefs.

The same advice stated that UK schools must:

- encourage respect for democracy and support for participation in the democratic processes
- [ensure pupils acquire] an understanding of how citizens can influence decision-making through the democratic process

for example by

- [including] in suitable parts of the curriculum, as appropriate for the age of pupils, material on the strengths, advantages and disadvantages of democracy, and how democracy and the law works in Britain, in contrast to other forms of government in other countries;
- [ensuring] that all pupils within the school have a voice that is listened to, and demonstrate how democracy works by actively promoting democratic processes, such as a school council whose members are voted for by the pupils.

After the spread of the COVID-19 pandemic in the United Kingdom in 2020, Queen Elizabeth II delivered a special address that listed "the attributes of self-discipline, of quiet good-humoured resolve and of fellow-feeling" as characteristic of Britain.

== Ethnicity and social trends ==
Due to immigration from other countries, not all people residing in England and the United Kingdom are White. According to the 2011 census in England, around 85.4% of residents are White (British, Irish, other European), 7.8% Asian (mainly South Asian), 3.5% Black, 2.3% are of mixed-race heritage, 0.4% Arab, and 0.6% identified as Other ethnicity, with a significantly higher non-white population in large cities such as London.

A survey conducted in 2007 found that the majority of people in many non-white ethnic minority groups living in Great Britain described their national identity as British, English, Scottish or Welsh. This included almost nine in ten (87%) of people with mixed heritage, 85% of Black Caribbean people, 80% of Pakistanis and 78% of Bangladeshis. Non-whites were more likely to describe themselves as British than whites. One-third of people from the White British group described themselves as British; the remaining two-thirds of respondents identified themselves as English, Welsh, or Scottish ethnic groups.

A study conducted for the Commission for Racial Equality (CRE) in 2005 found that, in England, the majority of ethnic minority participants identified primarily as British, whereas ethnic English participants identified as English first and British second. In Wales and Scotland, the majority of both white and ethnic minority participants identified as Welsh or Scottish first and British second, although they saw no incompatibility between the two identities. Other research conducted for the CRE found that white participants felt that there was a threat to Britishness from large-scale immigration, the "unfair" claims that they perceived ethnic minorities made on the welfare state, a rise in moral pluralism, and political correctness. Much of this frustration was found to be targeted at Muslims rather than minorities in general. Muslim participants in the study reported feeling victimised and stated that they felt that they were being asked to choose between Muslim and British identities, whereas they saw it possible to be both at the same time.

== Within the United Kingdom ==
=== England ===
In the 2021 census, 56.8% of the population of England chose a "British only" identity, while 15.3% chose "English only". A further 14.3% chose both "British" and "English". So 71.1% of the population of England with some sort of British identity, forming a majority. This is a large change compared to the 2011 census, where 19.2% chose "British only", 60.4% chose "English only" and 9.1% for both. However, the Office for National Statistics addressed the large change in identity likely to be due to a change in the order the nationalities were listed, with "British" being listed as the top response option in England for 2021.

=== Northern Ireland ===
In the 2021 census, 31.9% of the population of Northern Ireland chose a "British only" identity, while 29.1% chose "Irish only" and 19.8% chose "Northern Irish only".

=== Scotland ===
National Identity in Scotland from 1997 to 2003 (in %)
Identity	1997	1999	2001	2003
Scottish not British	23	32	36	31
More Scottish than British	38	35	30	34
Equally Scottish and British	27	22	24	22
More British than Scottish	4	3	3	4
British not Scottish	4	4	3	4

There is evidence that people in Scotland are increasingly likely to describe themselves as Scottish, and less likely to say they are British. A 2006 study by social scientists at the Universities of Edinburgh, Dundee, St Andrews and Lancaster shows that more than eight out of ten people in Scotland saw themselves as Scottish. At the same time, there has been a long-term decline in Scots defining themselves as British, although more than half of the people in the survey saw themselves as British.

In the 2011 Census in Scotland:

- 62% identified themselves as Scottish only
- 18% identified themselves as Scottish and British
- 8% identified themselves as British only

In the 2021 Census in Scotland:

- 65.5% identified themselves as Scottish only
- 8.2% identified themselves as Scottish and British
- 13.9% identified themselves as British only

The Scottish National Party MSP and Cabinet Secretary for Justice Kenny MacAskill gave the following submission to the UK Parliament's Joint Committee on Human Rights in March 2008 discussing a British Bill of Rights:

What is meant by Britishness? Is there a concept of Britishness? Yes, just as there is a concept of being Scandinavian. We eat fish and chips, we eat chicken masala, we watch EastEnders. Are [the SNP] British? No, we are not. We consider ourselves Scottish.

=== Wales ===
Similar to Scotland, results from the Annual Population Survey (APS) conducted by the Office for National Statistics, show that the majority of people residing in Wales describe themselves as Welsh. Respondents were asked whether they considered their national identity to be 'Welsh', or 'Non-Welsh' (defined as: 'English', 'Scottish', 'Irish', 'British' or 'Other'). In June 2017, 63.2% of respondents in Wales defined their national identity as 'Welsh'.

In the 2021 census, only 18.5% of the population of Wales chose a "British only" identity, while 55.2% chose "Welsh only". A further 8.1% chose both "British" and "Welsh". So 26.6% of the population of Wales with some sort of British identity, a minority, with the majority adopting Welsh as their identity. This is a small change compared to the 2011 census, where 16.9% chose "British only", 57.5% chose "Welsh only" and 7.1% for both.

=== Identity and politics ===
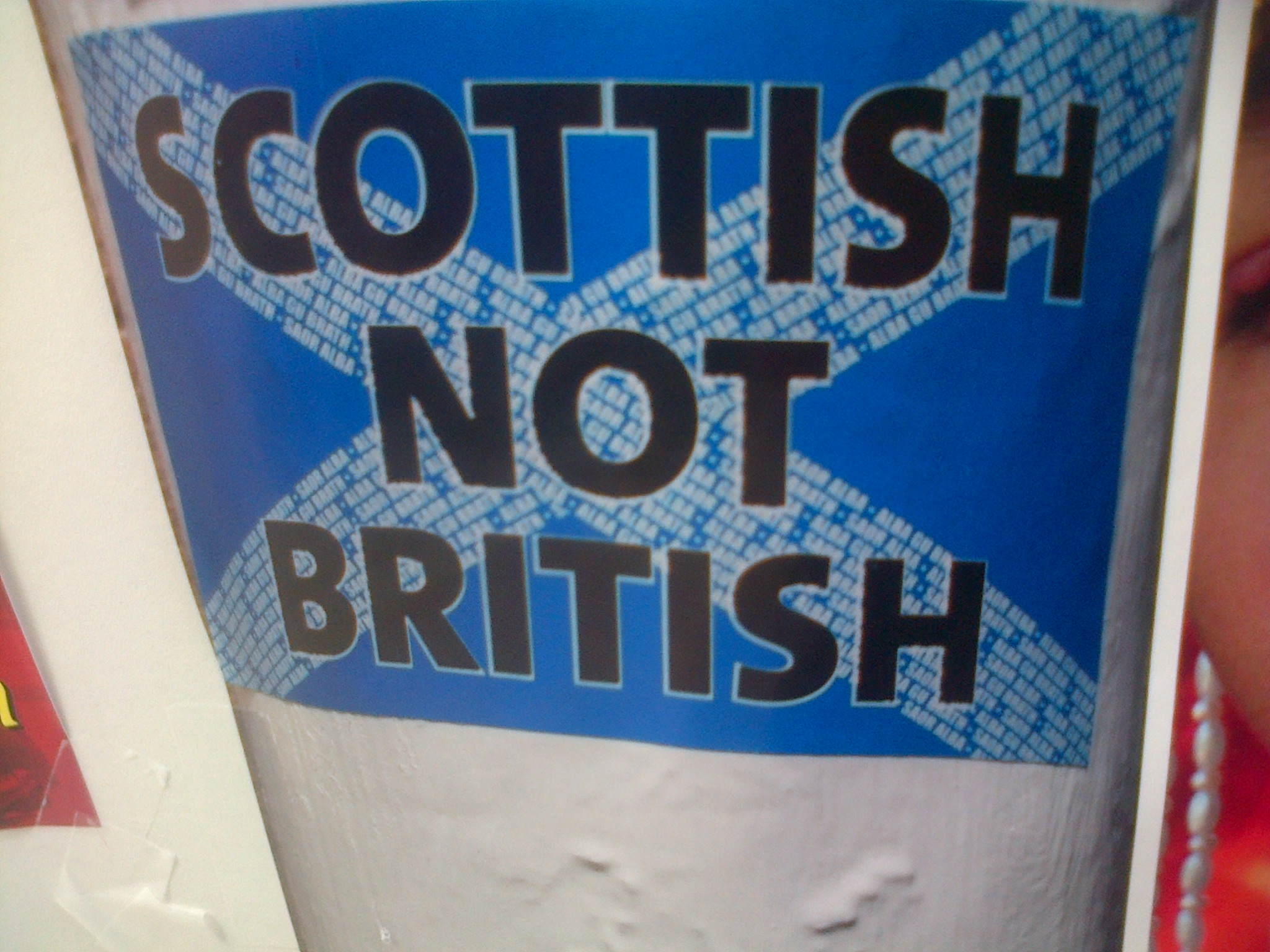
Sticker with the term "Scottish, not British"

In a 1998 poll, 37% of Scottish National Party voters stated themselves to be "Scottish, not British", the rest demonstrating some form of British identity, with the most popular choice being "More Scottish than British" (41%). This conclusion was again put forward in 2002, with similar figures cited. However, the British Social Attitudes Survey of 2007 found that only 21% of Scots saw themselves as 'Equally Scottish and British', with less than half choosing British as a secondary identity. The report concluded that 73% of respondents saw themselves as 'only' or 'mainly' Scottish.

== See also ==
- British humour
- British nationalism
- British studies
- Cool Britannia
- Cricket test
- Jacobean debate on the Union
- National colours of the United Kingdom
- Stiff upper lip
- Tea in the United Kingdom

== Bibliography ==
- Banerjee, Sukanya. Becoming Imperial Citizens: Indians in the Late-Victorian Empire (Duke University Press, 2010)).
- Bell, Duncan. The idea of greater Britain: empire and the future of world order, 1860-1900 (Princeton University Press, 2010).
- Belmessous, Sahila. Assimilation and Empire (Oxford University Press, 2013)
- Bradley, Ian C. Believing in Britain: the spiritual identity of 'Britishness' (Oxford: Lion, 2008).
- Colley, Linda (1992), Britons: Forging the Nation, 1701–1837, Yale University Press, ISBN 978-0-300-05737-9
- Commission for Racial Equality (November 2005), Citizenship and Belonging: What is Britishness? (PDF), Commission for Racial Equality, ISBN 1-85442-573-0, archived from the original (PDF) on 7 January 2009
- Harrington, Jack. "The Imperial Citizen: British India and French Algeria." in Citizenship after Orientalism: Transforming Political Theory (Palgrave Macmillan UK, 2015) pp.53-69. online
- Harrington, Jack. "Orientalism, political subjectivity and the birth of citizenship between 1780 and 1830." Citizenship After Orientalism (Routledge, 2015). 11-24.
- Knaur, Krzysztof, ed. Britishness and cultural studies : continuity and change in narrating the nation (2000) online
- Kong, Vivian. Multiracial Britishness: Global Networks in Hong Kong, 1910–45 (Cambridge University Press, 2023) online review of this book
- Maclean, Kama. British India, White Australia: Overseas Indians, Intercolonial Relations, and the Empire (Sydney: NewSouth, 2020)
- Modood, Tariq, and John Salt, eds. Global migration, ethnicity and Britishness (Palgrave Macmillan, 2013) online
- Shilliam, Robert. “Ethiopianism, Englishness, Britishness: Struggles over Imperial Belonging,” Citizenship Studies 20#2 (2016): 243-59
- Wright, Tony; Gamble, Andrew (2009), Britishness: Perspectives on the British Question, John Wiley and Sons, ISBN 978-1-4051-9269-9
