= British National Day =

Proposed UK national day

British National Day is a proposed official national day for the United Kingdom and a celebration of British national identity. Currently the UK has no single official national day, although the King's Official Birthday is used for this purpose in some contexts.

== Overview ==
Britain has no unique national day. It has a number of days of celebration which go largely uncelebrated, and others which are associated with the constituent countries of the United Kingdom. The latter category includes Saint George's Day in England, Saint Andrew's Day in Scotland, Saint David's Day in Wales and Saint Patrick's Day in Northern Ireland.

At present, the King's Official Birthday is marked as a de facto national day by British diplomatic missions overseas but not in the UK itself.

=== Labour government ===
In June 2008, Immigration Minister Liam Byrne suggested that the "August bank holiday" be made a weekend of national celebration in a speech to Labour Party and think tank Progress. However, Scotland's August bank holiday is held on a different date from that in Wales and England. He later retracted this—after pressure from the Scottish National Party (SNP)—saying that he was merely trying to "get the debate started". Angus Robertson MP and Westminster SNP group leader stated, "Labour's cack-handed attempts to resuscitate a British 'national' identity are just desperate, motivated by self interest rather than national interest".

In October 2008, in response to a question in the House of Commons from Andrew Rosindell, Minister of State Michael Wills of the Ministry of Justice revealed that "there are no plans to introduce a national day at the present time", leading to suggestions that the proposal had been "scrapped". Immediately thereafter, however, a Ministry of Justice spokesman confirmed that national day proposals were still "very much alive", adding that Wills had only meant that no plans had been drawn up at the present time.

=== Coalition government ===
In 2011, the coalition government composed of the Conservative Party and the Liberal Democrats proposed moving the May Day bank holiday in the United Kingdom to October, suggesting it be called 'UK Day' or be associated with Trafalgar Day. The removal of the May Day holiday was opposed by trade unions as a result of its associations with being an International Workers' Day. and by those who supported the continuance of an ancient folk tradition that may have existed since Anglo-Saxon times.

== Candidates for a new national day ==
Most of the suggested proposals for a British Day are already existing holidays or days of celebration in the UK which either are poorly marked by the government and the people, or are not readily associated with the idea of Britishness at present. They include:

- 1 May, being both May Day and the date that the Acts of Union 1707 took effect. The existing May Day bank holiday sometimes falls on 1 May.
- Birthday of Elizabeth II (21 April)
- Victory in Europe Day (8 May)
- D-Day (6 June)
- Democracy Day (7 June) to remember the Reform Act 1832, also known as the Great Reform Act.
- The date of the signing of Magna Carta (15 June) (a legal Charter for the Kingdom of England).
- The King's Official Birthday (a Saturday chosen in June).
- Wilberforce Day (24 August) to remember the ending of slavery and the part played by William Wilberforce.
- Battle of Hastings (14 October) Anniversary of the Battle of Hastings.
- Trafalgar Day (21 October)
- Armistice Day (11 November)
- Remembrance Sunday (Sunday following Armistice Day)

== Opposition ==
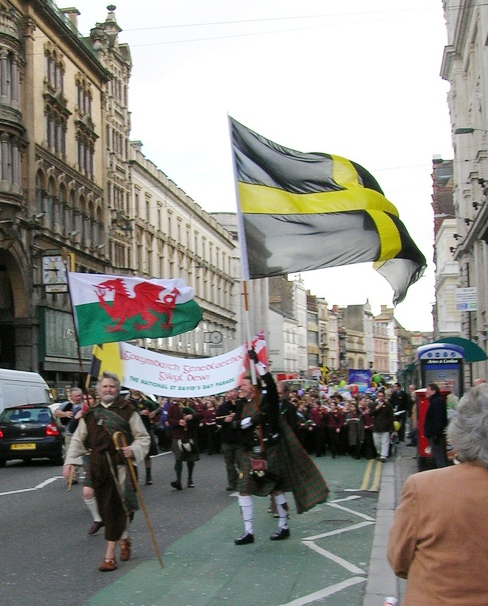
Celebrating St David's Day in Cardiff, 2007

On a report about a potential British Day, Peter Goldsmith, Baron Goldsmith said:

"There were undoubtedly issues raised about how a national day would be received in Scotland, Wales or Northern Ireland. But the important point to stress in this regard is that there ought to be nothing in the framework of the national day to prevent particular areas from creating events that celebrate other shared identities alongside our bond of shared citizenship. People have multiple identities and it would be false for events organised for a national day not to be responsive to that."

David Cameron, as Leader of the Opposition, criticised it as a gimmick in response to the 2006 Queen's Speech.

In Wales, the proposed British Day has been criticised by Plaid Cymru and others. There have been repeated calls for St David's Day, the feast day of the patron saint of Wales, to be made a bank holiday. One poll found this idea to have the support of 87% of the Welsh public, and in the National Assembly for Wales all 60 members, representing Labour, Plaid Cymru, the Liberal Democrats and the Conservatives, voted unanimously for it to be declared so. The UK government rejected the proposal on the grounds that it was not practical to introduce an additional public holiday. On 3 June 2008, the Deputy Leader of Plaid Cymru in the National Assembly for Wales, Alun Ffred Jones AM, said about the proposed British Day:

"This goes to prove how out of touch Labour is in Westminster. It's just another stunt to try and push Gordon Brown's agenda to make us all feel British instead of Welsh, Scottish, English or Northern Irish. While we don’t even have a bank holiday on our recognised national day in Wales, this London Labour government wants us to celebrate a special day that's being created to support their political goals. It would be far more constructive for the Westminster government to support Plaid Cymru's call for a national holiday on St David's day – a national celebration that is already widely observed across the country."

This contrasts with other parts of the United Kingdom. St Patrick's Day has been a bank holiday in Northern Ireland since the enactment of the Bank Holiday (Ireland) Act 1903, and in 2007 the Scottish Parliament – which has greater devolved powers than the Senedd – passed the St Andrew's Day Bank Holiday (Scotland) Act 2007 which made St Andrew's Day a bank holiday in Scotland. Bank holidays in the United Kingdom do not entitle workers to a statutory holiday or extra pay on these days.

== British Day in Germany ==
A British Day has been held in Hamburg in Germany for many years ("British Day" 1991–2010, "British Flair" since 2011) with a full Proms with Union Flag waving, "Land of Hope and Glory" and "God Save the King", on 5 and 6 September 2009. The observance of British Day in Hamburg being in Germany goes back to the time of the House of Hanover of the 18th century, when a Hanoverian branch of the British royal family had the British crown.

Karlsruhe city hall hoists the flag of EU member countries on their national day. The UK flag was hoisted on 21 April, the actual birthday of Queen Elizabeth II.

== See also ==
- British diaspora
- St Piran's Day
