= Armed Forces Day (United Kingdom) =

Annual military-themed public event in the United Kingdom

- Official name: Armed Forces Day
- Also called: AFD
- Observed by: United Kingdom
- Significance: Celebration and recognition of the contributions, both past and present, of those who have served in the British Armed Forces
- Observances: Parades, demonstrations of military equipment, flypasts and air displays, silences for the fallen, celebrations, reunions
- Date: Last Saturday of June
- Frequency: annual
- Related to: Remembrance Day

Armed Forces Day (AFD) in the United Kingdom (UK) is an annual public event celebrated in late June to commemorate the service of men and women of all ranks, trades and professions in the British Armed Forces. Originally known as Veterans' Day, it was first observed in 2006 on 27 June. Although an official British military event, supported by all three service branches, it is not a public holiday in the UK. Its name was changed to Armed Forces Day in 2009. Armed Forces Day has more recently been observed on the last Saturday in June, held at various locations throughout the UK.

== Origins ==
The first Veterans' Day was announced in February 2006 by then-Chancellor of the Exchequer, who said the aim was to ensure the contribution of [military] veterans was never forgotten. The day was marked across the United Kingdom with local ceremonies, and the presentation of medals to living ex-servicemen and women. 27 June was chosen, as it is the day following the date of the first ceremony of awards of the Victoria Cross (VC), held in Hyde Park, London on 26 June 1857.

Veterans' Day was created as a permanent extension of Veterans' Awareness Week held in 2005. Subsequently renamed Armed Forces Day, it generally focuses on celebrating living current/ex servicemen and women; whereas Remembrance Day focuses on honouring the dead. Although it used to be called Veterans' Day in the UK, it is not the same as the United States' Veterans Day which is more similar to Remembrance Day in the Commonwealth.

On 25 June 2007, Jim Devine, the Member of Parliament for Livingston, tabled a House of Commons Early Day Motion calling for the day to be a public holiday, stating "that this House recognises the outstanding contribution that veterans have made to the country; and believes that Veterans' Day should be a national public holiday across the United Kingdom."

== Veterans' Day ==
=== 2006 ===
The first Veterans' Day in 2006 featured a series of events across the UK, which included an event at the Imperial War Museum in London; attended by Lachhiman Gurung VC, a Nepalese recipient of the Victoria Cross, which was awarded for bravery in 1945 when he was a Rifleman in the 4th Battalion of The 8th Gurkha Rifles, British Indian Army during World War II in Burma (Myanmar), and Corporal Christopher Finney GC of the Blues and Royals who was awarded the George Cross for bravery under friendly fire during the 2003 invasion of Iraq. Parades were held in Dundee and Staffordshire, as well as a national service of thanksgiving at Westminster Abbey. There was also an evening reception at 10 Downing Street for representatives of veterans associations.

=== 2007 ===
The 2007 national event was held in Birmingham as the start of a five-day event from 27 June to 1 July. In the morning there was a 'Parade of Standards', which was led by The Central Band of the Royal Air Force, from the International Convention Centre (ICC) to the Hall of Memory in Centenary Square.

The day also included celebrations in Victoria Square, where a replica Supermarine Spitfire WW2-era fighter aircraft was on display. The Minister for Veterans Derek Twigg, presented five Veterans' Badges, and met the families of service personnel who died in the line of duty.

=== 2008 ===
For the 2008 Veterans' Day, the main national event was hosted in Blackpool as part of the resort's annual National Veterans' Week, which ran from 21 to 29 June 2008.

Local events were held throughout the UK, and the day was promoted by a nationwide television advert. The National Veterans' Day Service was held at Blackpool Cenotaph, a Grade II Listed building which had just been restored, by North Pier on central promenade. The service was led by the Bishop of Blackburn and was attended by Camilla, Duchess of Cornwall, Derek Twigg, and General Sir Richard Dannatt, the Chief of the General Staff, as well as Henry Allingham (at the time, he was the oldest surviving veteran of World War I). The service was followed by a 'Schools Veterans' Day Thank You', performed by local school children.

Various other events were held throughout Blackpool during the day, including a 'Badge Presentation ceremony' in the Tower Ballroom with the Duchess of Cornwall presenting veteran badges to among others, Martin Bell. Furthermore, there was a Veterans' Parade along the promenade, and a Falklands War veteran abseiled down Blackpool Tower.

The weekly BBC Radio 2 programme Friday Night is Music Night was broadcast live from the Opera House of the Winter Gardens, presented by Ken Bruce, with the BBC Concert Orchestra, Alfie Boe, and Rebecca Thornhill. The Red Devils parachute display team performed an illuminated 'night-time parachute drop' outside North Pier, and the day ended with a Firework Finalé from the pier.

Other events around the UK included a commemoration at Trafalgar Square in London.

== Armed Forces Day ==
=== 2009 ===
Armed Forces Day

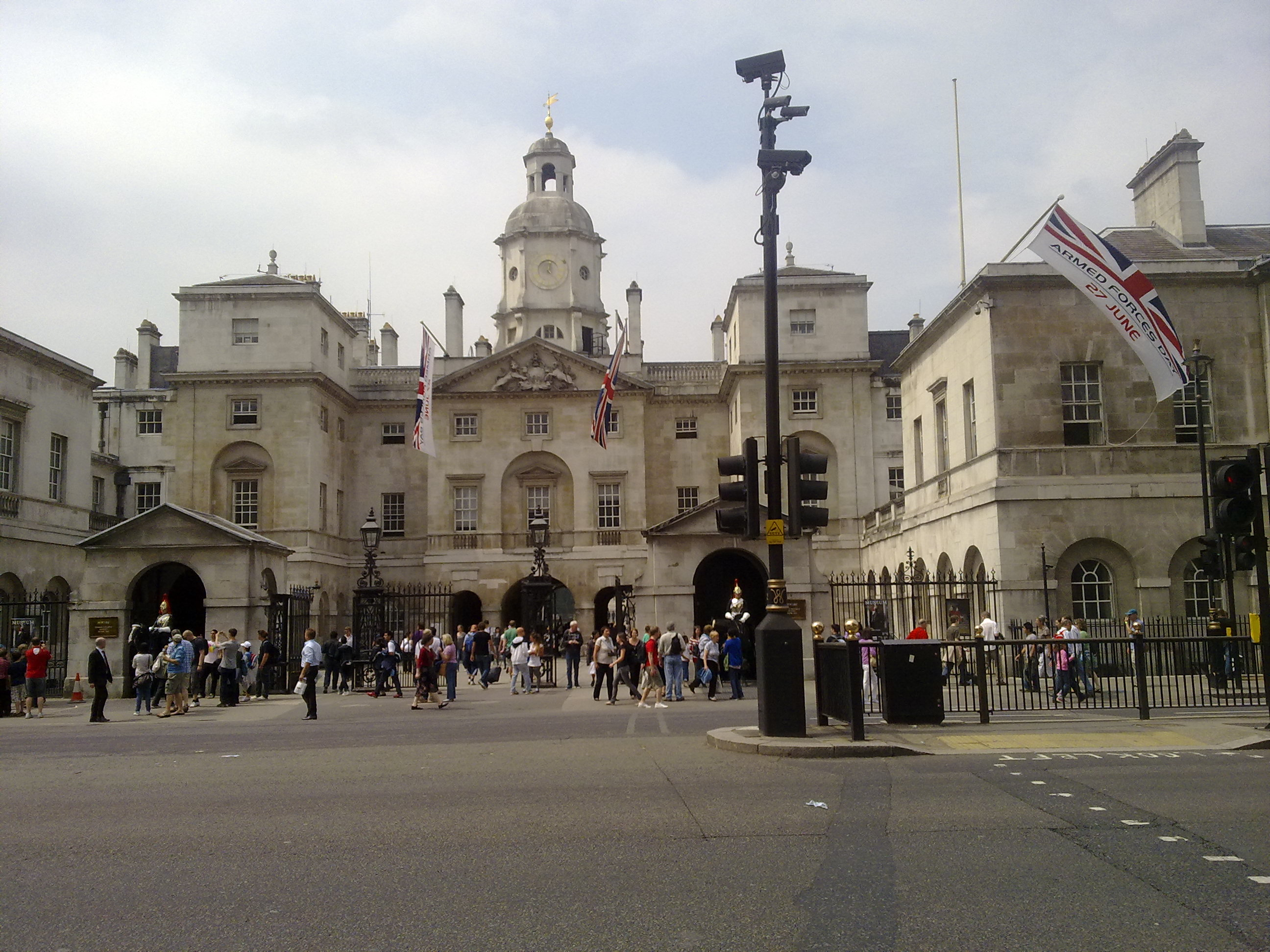
2009 London

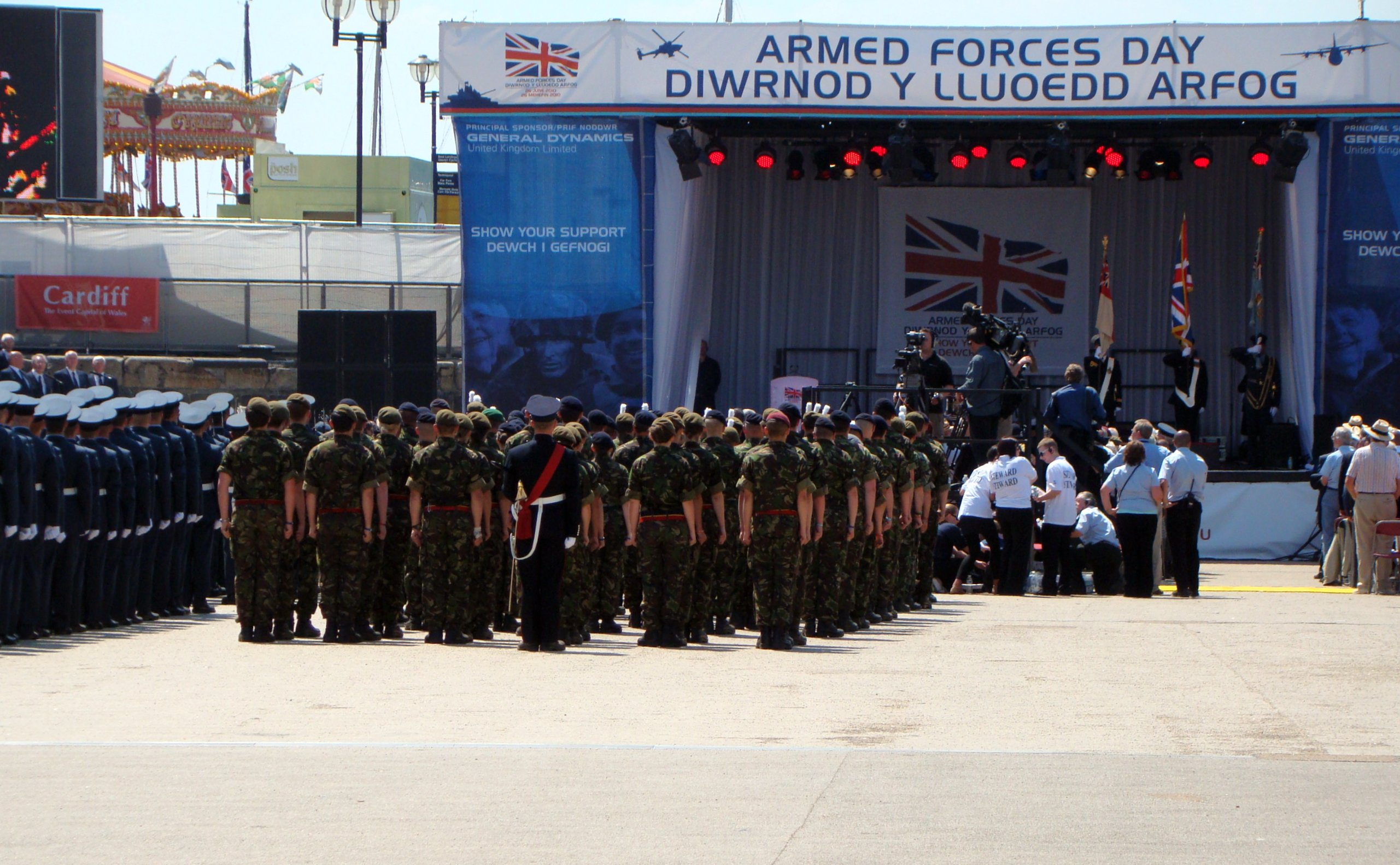
2010 Cardiff

In 2009 the name of the event was changed to Armed Forces Day, to raise awareness and appreciation for those on active duty. It took place on Saturday 27 June. The host town was Chatham, Kent with events elsewhere, including London.

=== 2010 ===
Armed Forces Day 2010 was held on Saturday 26 June, hosted in the Welsh capital of Cardiff.

The day-long celebrations included a military parade from Cardiff Castle to Cardiff Bay and the city's waterfront, where a range of events, activities and artistic performances were staged on land, sea and air. The parade was led by the Prince of Wales and the Duchess of Cornwall. Royal Navy frigate HMS Kent was docked in Cardiff to take part in the events. An estimated 50,000 people attended the celebrations in the city.

Among the cities joining Cardiff in hosting events were Glasgow, Edinburgh, Aberdeen, Plymouth, Nottingham, Bristol and Manchester.

Events in Cardiff included:

- A traditional Drumhead Service in Roald Dahl Plass
- Fly-overs by the Battle of Britain Memorial Flight, the Red Arrows and Helicopter Formation
- Arena displays in Roald Dahl Plass including the Royal Marine Commando Display Team, and the Royal Marine Band
- Military displays representing all of the armed forces throughout Cardiff Bay
- Search and rescue Sea King rescue display on the water
- The opportunity to go aboard HMS Kent docked in Roath Basin for the weekend
- An evening of stage performances featuring The Soldiers and Welsh male voice choir Only Men Aloud!
- A firework finale over the waters of Cardiff Bay

=== 2011 ===
Armed Forces Day 2011 took place on Saturday 25 June, with the main parade held on the Royal Mile in the Scottish capital of Edinburgh, which was that year's host city. The personnel of the Royal Navy, British Army and Royal Air Force took the salute from Prince Charles, at the Scottish Parliament, in the presence of dignitaries, including the Prime Minister, the Foreign Secretary, the Defence Secretary, the First Minister of Scotland, and the Chief of the Defence Staff. Over Edinburgh there was a fly-past by the Battle of Britain Memorial Flight and the Red Arrows. HMS Portland, a Royal Navy frigate, was moored at Leith, Edinburgh's port, for public tours.

In Windsor, Berkshire, at the Victoria Barracks, the Irish Guards were awarded their Afghan operational medals by Prince William – who is their ceremonial Colonel of the Regiment – and Catherine, Duchess of Cambridge.

Further events and parades were held across the United Kingdom. At the Royal Navy's base in Portsmouth, a number of public events took place over the weekend, and Royal Navy destroyers HMS Gloucester and HMS Daring were docked and available to the public.

=== 2012 ===
UK Armed Forces Day 2012 was centred on Plymouth and took place on Saturday 30 June. Similar events were held throughout the United Kingdom. The day was focused around local celebrations of their armed forces, with the prime minister David Cameron coming into lend support for the armed forces, according to the British Government. Highlights of this service include but is not limited to: a Battle of Britain memorial flight, a Spitfire being on display, and a performance by the Red Arrows for the navy.

=== 2013 ===
The national event took place In Nottingham and took place on Saturday 29 June. Over 300 similar events were held throughout the United Kingdom.

=== 2014 ===
The national event took place in Stirling and took place on Saturday 28 June. Hundreds of similar events were held throughout the United Kingdom.

=== 2015 ===
The national event took place in Guildford on Saturday 27 June. Hundreds of similar local events were held throughout the United Kingdom.

=== 2016 ===
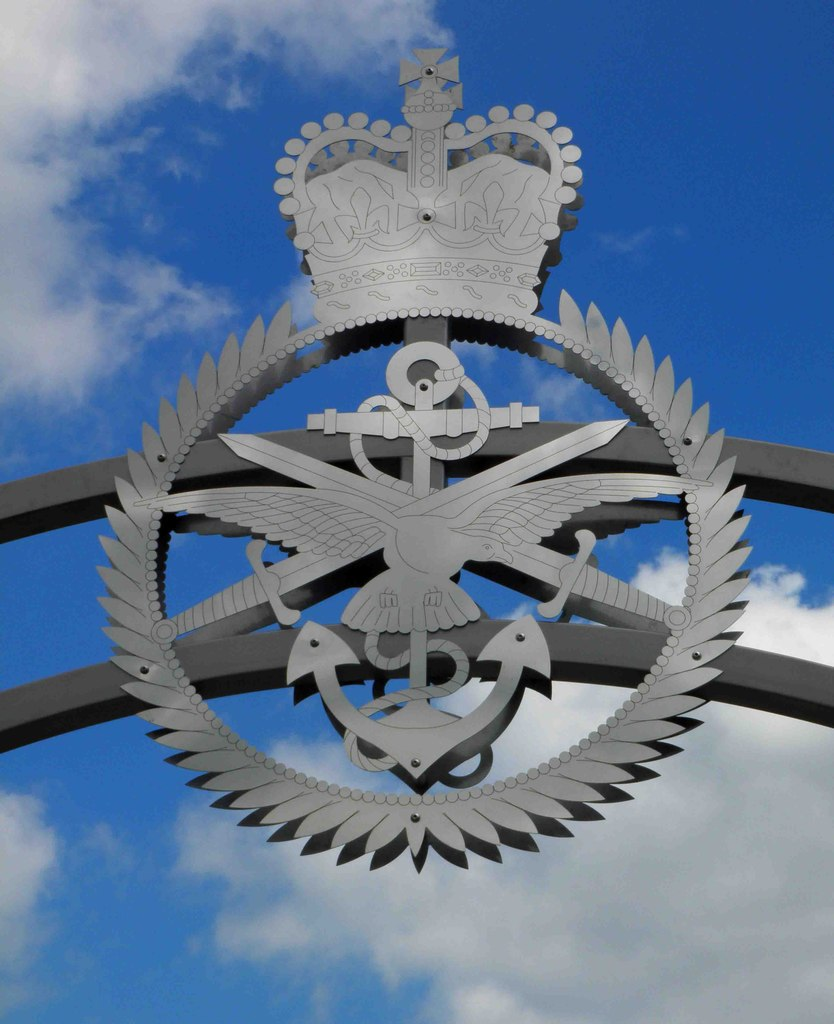
Detail of armed services memorial gate, Cleethorpes

The national event took place in the Lincolnshire resort of Cleethorpes on Saturday 25 June, with some activities on 26 June hosted in Grimsby Docks.

=== 2017 ===
The national event took place in Liverpool and featured a Red Arrows flypast and a parade to the waterfront.

=== 2018 ===
Llandudno was the host city for UK Armed Forces Day 2018, which was celebrated on Saturday 2 June.

=== 2019 ===
Salisbury was the host city for UK Armed Forces Day 2019, which was celebrated on Saturday 28 June.

=== 2020 ===
Scarborough was to be the host location for the 2020 UK Armed Forces Day event on Saturday 27 June. Scarborough was chosen to host the national event in June 2018 after submitting a bid which was described by the MoD as “outstanding”.

The event was due to take place on 27 June 2020, but has been postponed until 2022 due to the COVID-19 pandemic.

=== 2021 ===
Not held due to the COVID-19 Pandemic.

=== 2022 ===
Planned for 25 June, with the host town being Scarborough, which was to be host in the cancelled 2020 day.

=== 2025 ===
Is to be held in Cleethorpes again over the weekend of 27-29 June. With activities taking place a long the sea front from the Pier to the local leisure centre.

== Controversy ==
Armed Forces Day has been criticised by the Peace Pledge Union (PPU), a non-governmental organisation based in the United Kingdom which promotes pacifism. The PPU has argued the event "has fuelled the rise of militarism in everyday life in the UK" and "presents children with a simplistic image of armed force as glamorous and fun". In addition, the PPU has denounced the perceived failure of Armed Forces Day to support British veterans and criticises its compulsory nature in some locations. The PPU, along with other affiliated groups promoting pacifism in the UK, has regularly staged protests at Armed Forces Day events across Britain.

In Northern Ireland, Armed Forces Day is celebrated in some locations, including the town of Banbridge. However, the event has proved divisive, with unionists, including the Democratic Unionist Party (DUP), largely supporting it and republicans, including Sinn Féin, mostly opposing it (due to some of the actions of the British military during the Troubles). In 2012, the Ministry of Defence requested that the day be marked in Belfast by flying the Armed Forces Flag for six days in the last week of June. The request was criticised by the Social Democratic and Labour Party (SDLP) and Sinn Féin but supported by the Alliance Party of Northern Ireland (APNI) and the DUP. In 2020, the DUP attempted to pass legislation implementing the event in Belfast, which was supported by the APNI and opposed by the SDLP and the Green Party Northern Ireland. Sinn Féin politician Ciaran Beattie stated that " [many] in [Belfast] will feel this is an offensive display, that it is unnecessary, that it will divide the city. It is unwanted, and it certainly won’t be supported by us", adding that "I’m sure the vast majority of nationalists out there think it is offensive". The proposal narrowly failed in a vote held on 18 September 2020 at the Belfast City Hall.
