= Athletics in Russia =

Sport in Russia

Athletics is a sport in Russia. Russian athletes competed in international athletics competitions such as Olympic Games or World athletics championships. Athletics was governed in Russia by the All-Russia Athletic Federation. The World Anti-Doping Agency (WADA) found widespread doping and large-scale cover ups by the Russian authorities, the All-Russia Athletic Federation (ARAF) was declared non-compliant with respect to the World Anti-Doping Code, and in 2015 the IAAF council overwhelmingly voted in favour of prohibiting Russia from world sports events with immediate effect. ARAF accepted the indefinite IAAF suspension. As of 2022, due to the 2022 Russian invasion of Ukraine, World Athletics has banned all Russian athletes, support personnel, and officials from all World Athletics Series events for the foreseeable future, including those with ANA status. Beginning in March 2022, after the 2022 Russian invasion of Ukraine, the Diamond League excluded Russian and Belarusian athletes from all of its track and field meetings.

== Russian athletes at international competitions ==
=== Medal tables ===
Event	Medals			
Event	Gold medal	Silver medal	Bronze medal	Tot.
Olympic Games	25	26	25	76

=== Olympic Games ===
As the Russian Empire, the nation first competed at the 1900 Games, and returned again in 1908 and 1912. After the Russian revolution in 1917, and the subsequent establishment of the Soviet Union in 1922, it would be thirty years until Russian athletes once again competed at the Olympics, at the 1952 Summer Olympics in Helsinki. Following the dissolution of the Soviet Union in 1991, Russian athletes participated in the 1992 Summer Olympics in Barcelona as part of the Unified Team.

Games	Participants	Men				Women				Total			
Games	Participants	Gold medal	Silver medal	Bronze medal		Gold medal	Silver medal	Bronze medal		Gold medal	Silver medal	Bronze medal	
1900–1912	as part of the Russian Empire (RU1)												
1920–1948	did not participate												
1952–1988	as part of the Soviet Union (URS)												
(Spain) 1992 Barcelona	as part of the Unified Team (EUN)												
(United States) 1996 Atlanta	85	0	3	0	3	3	3	1	7	3	6	1	10
(Australia) 2000 Sydney	109	1	0	4	5	2	4	2	8	3	4	6	13
(Greece) 2004 Athens	115	1	1	3	5	5	6	3	14	6	7	6	19
(China) 2008 Beijing	104	2	1	3	6	4	4	4	12	6	5	7	18
(United Kingdom) 2012 London	97	1	0	0	1	6	4	5	15	7	4	5	16
(Brazil) 2016 Rio de Janeiro	1	0	0	0	0	0	0	0	0	0	0	0	0
Total		5	5	10	20	20	21	15	56	25	26	25	76

=== Doping ban ===
In December 2014, a documentary by German broadcaster ARD made wide-ranging allegations of state involvement in systematic doping in Russian athletics, accusing Russia of an "East German-style" doping programme. The allegations resulted in the resignation of ARAF President Valentin Balakhnichevas Treasurer of the International Association of Athletics Federations (IAAF).

The World Anti-Doping Agency (WADA) subsequently investigated the allegations. The 323-page report, published on 9 November 2015, confirmed widespread doping and large-scale cover ups by the authorities. It recommended that the All-Russia Athletic Federation (ARAF) be declared non-compliant with respect to the World Anti-Doping Code, and recommended that the International Olympic Committee not accept any entries from ARAF until compliance was reached. Based on this report, which The Guardian described as "damning", the IAAF council overwhelmingly voted 22–1 in favour of prohibiting Russia from world sports events with immediate effect, in its 13 November session. Russia has been also prohibited from hosting the 2016 World Race Walking Team Championships (Cheboksary) and 2016 World Junior Championships (Kazan), and ARAF must entrust doping cases to Court of Arbitration for Sport. ARAF accepted the indefinite IAAF suspension and did not request a hearing. ARAF's efforts towards regaining full IAAF membership will be monitored by a five-person IAAF team.

=== Russian invasion of Ukraine ban ===
As of 2022, due to the 2022 Russian invasion of Ukraine, World Athletics banned all Russian athletes, support personnel, and officials from all World Athletics Series events for the foreseeable future, including those with ANA status. Beginning in March 2022, after the 2022 Russian invasion of Ukraine, the Diamond League excluded Russian and Belarusian athletes from all of its track and field meetings.

== See also ==
- List of Russian records in athletics
- All-Russia Athletic Federation
