= Yuliya Stepanova =

Russian distance runner

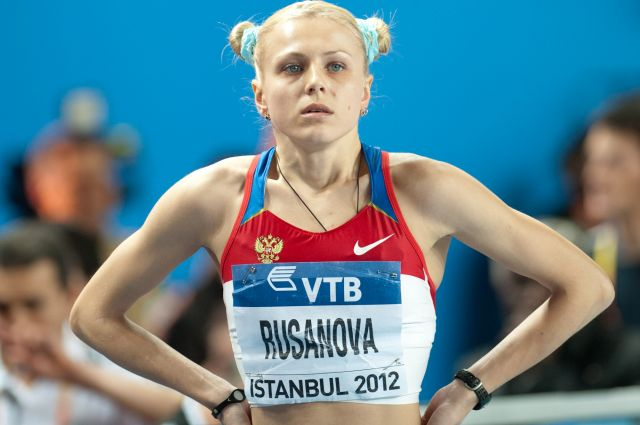
- Rusanova at the 2012 World Indoor Championships in Istanbul

Personal information
- Born: 3 July 1986 (age 39) Kursk, Russian SFSR, Soviet Union

Sport
- Sport: Athletics
- Event: 800–1500 m

Achievements and titles
- Personal best(s): 800 m – 1:56.99 (2011); 1000 m – 2:39.81 (2009); 1500 m – 4:06.08 (2009)

Yuliya Igorevna Stepanova (née Rusanova; Russian: Ю́лия И́горевна Степанова (Русанова); born 3 July 1986) is a Russian runner who specializes in the 800 metres track event. Stepanova was also an informant for World Anti-Doping Agency (WADA) about Russia's large-scale doping program. She and her husband, Vitaly Stepanov, exposed widespread doping in Russia.

== Career ==
Stepanova, then known as Yuliya Rusanova, started having testosterone injections at the suggestion of her coach, Vladimir Mokhnev, and later took anabolic steroids. Stepanova's athletic results began to improve rapidly and she was offered a place on the Russian national team. In 2011 she won 3rd place in the 800 m race at the European Athletics Indoor Championships in Paris and 2nd place in the 800 m race at the Russian Championships in Cheboksary the same year. All her results since March 2011 was stripped, because of abnormalities in her biological passport, which were found in 2013. She was banned for two years.

She said in a 2016 interview, "I knew it was banned but I think my coach prepared me well because he was telling me stories about how it's normal, that's what all athletes do." On 26 February 2013, the International Association of Athletics Federations (IAAF) announced that Rusanova had been banned for two years following abnormalities in her biological passport. All of her results from 3 March 2011 were forfeited.

Stepanova and her husband Vitaliy Stepanov, a former Chief Specialist of the Education Department of the Russian Anti-Doping Agency (RUSADA), wrote letters to the World Anti-Doping Agency describing doping in Russia but received little response. Deciding she needed more evidence, she began secretly recording conversations between leading Russian sports officials, trainers, doctors and athletes about the use of illegal performance-enhancing drugs. In 2014, the couple appeared in a documentary by Hajo Seppelt for the German TV network Das Erste, accusing the Russian sports system of large-scale doping fraud. Both said that Russian athletics officials supplied banned substances in exchange for 5% of an athlete's earnings and falsified tests together with doping control officers. The revelations led to an investigation by the World Anti-Doping Agency. Russia was subsequently accused of running a state-sponsored doping program.

A spokesman for Russian President Vladimir Putin called Stepanova a "Judas". The Russian media have attacked her character and her mother received criticism at work for raising an "unpatriotic" daughter.

Although the IAAF decided not to lift the ban on Russian athletes before the 2016 Summer Olympics, it stated that "three or four" Russian athletes might be permitted to appear as independent competitors. Its taskforce recommended that Stepanova be allowed to compete due to her "truly exceptional contribution to the fight against doping in sport" including "great personal risks". WADA's former chief investigator, Jack Robertson, praised Stepanova for giving information without asking for a reduction of her sentence, to which she was entitled as a whistleblower. She completed her full sentence.

On 1 July 2016, the IAAF approved Stepanova's application to compete as a neutral athlete. Five days later, she competed at the European Championships but finished last in her heat with a torn ligament in her foot. On 24 July, the International Olympic Committee (IOC) rejected the recommendation to allow Stepanova to compete at the 2016 Summer Olympics, citing her drug infraction in 2013, for which she had served her sentence. WADA director general Olivier Niggli stated that his agency was "very concerned by the message that this sends whistleblowers for the future." Stepanova said, "Unfortunately, the behaviour of [IOC President] Thomas Bach was the same as Russia's behaviour towards us." In August 2016, WADA reported that Stepanova's athlete account, where she enters information about her whereabouts, had been hacked. According to WADA, "A subsequent investigation allowed the agency to determine that no other athlete accounts on ADAMS have been accessed." Bach said that the IOC was "not responsible for dangers to which Ms. Stepanova may be exposed."

In October 2016, the IOC announced that it had offered to assist Stepanova to continue her sports career. Later the same year, she was chosen as one of BBC's 100 Women and Germany's Doping-Opfer-Hilfe (Doping Victims Assistance) awarded her its 2016 Anti-Doping Prize.

Yuliya trained to compete at the 2017 World Championships in Athletics but did not compete.

In July 2018, Stepanova testified before the U.S. Helsinki Commission in Washington, DC on the subject of doping in sports. She was on a panel alongside Travis Tygart, CEO of the U.S. Anti-Doping Administration, Jim Walden, the attorney for Russian Whistle-blower Grigory Rodchenkov, and Katie Uhlaender, a four-time Olympian competitor in skeleton. Stepanova claimed that speaking out against doping in Russia would have put her life at risk.

== Personal life ==
Rusanova was born and raised in Kursk. She married Vitaly Stepanov in 2009, and gave birth to their son in November 2013. She now uses the surname Stepanova, the feminine form of Stepanov. Together with her husband and son, she moved from Russia to Germany in December 2014. As of 2016, they lived in the United States.

== Competitions ==
Year	Competition	Venue	Position	Event	Notes
Representing Russia
2011	European Indoor Championships	Paris, France	Disqualified	800 m	2:00.80
2011	World Championships	Daegu, South Korea	Disqualified	800 m	1:59.74
2012	World Indoor Championships	Istanbul, Turkey	Disqualified	800 m	2:01.87
