= Doping in Russia =

Systematic doping of Russian athletes has resulted in 51 Olympic medals stripped from Russia (and Russian associated teams), four times the number of the next highest, and more than 30% of the global total. Russia has the most competitors who have been caught doping at the Olympic Games in the world, with more than 150.

The World Anti-Doping Agency (WADA) has described doping among Russian competitors as state-sponsored and systematic, with the Russian state being found to have supplied steroids and other drugs to athletes. Due to widespread violations of anti-doping regulations, including an attempt to sabotage ongoing investigations by the manipulation of computer data, WADA in 2019 banned the Russian Federation from all major sporting events, including the Olympic Games, for four years, but in 2020 the Court of Arbitration for Sport (CAS) reduced the ban period to two years following an appeal by Russia. Competitors from Russia meanwhile may take part in international competitions under a neutral flag and designation.

In May 2026, the International Olympic Committee lifted its suspension on Russia, paving the way for Russian teams to return to the Olympic fold before the Los Angeles 2028 Games.

== Soviet era ==
According to British journalist Andrew Jennings, a KGB colonel stated that the agency's officers had posed as anti-doping authorities from the International Olympic Committee (IOC) to undermine doping tests and that Soviet competitors were "rescued with [these] tremendous efforts". Regarding the 1980 Summer Olympics in the Soviet Union, a 1989 Australian study said, "There is hardly a medal winner at the Moscow Games, certainly not a gold medal winner, who is not on one sort of drug or another: usually several kinds. The Moscow Games might as well have been called the Chemists' Games."

Documents obtained in 2016 revealed the Soviet Union's plans for a statewide doping system in track and field in preparation for the 1984 Summer Olympics in Los Angeles. Dated prior to the country's decision to participate in the 1984 Summer Olympics boycott, the document detailed the existing steroids operations of the program, along with suggestions for further enhancements. The communication, directed to the Soviet Union's head of track and field, was prepared by Dr. Sergei Portugalov of the Military Institute of Physical Culture. Portugalov was also one of the main figures involved in the implementation of the Russian doping program prior to the 2016 Summer Olympics.

== Timeline of the doping ==
=== Doping issues from 2008 to 2009 ===
In 2008, seven Russian track and field athletes were suspended ahead of the Summer Olympics in Beijing for manipulating their urine samples.

Multiple Russian biathletes were involved in doping offences in run-up to the 2010 Winter Olympics. The president of the International Biathlon Union, Anders Besseberg, said, "We are facing systematic doping on a large scale in one of the strongest teams of the world."

Reviewing 7,289 blood samples from 2,737 competitors from 2001 to 2009, a report found that the number of suspicious samples from "Country A" notably exceeded other countries. One of the authors said that Country A was Russia.

In October 2009, International Association of Athletics Federations (IAAF) general secretary Pierre Weiss wrote to Valentin Balakhnichev that blood samples from Russian athletes "recorded some of the highest values ever seen since the IAAF started testing" and that tests from the 2009 World Championships "strongly suggest a systematic abuse of blood doping or EPO-related products".

=== 2010–2014: allegations of state-sponsored doping and 2014 ARD documentary ===
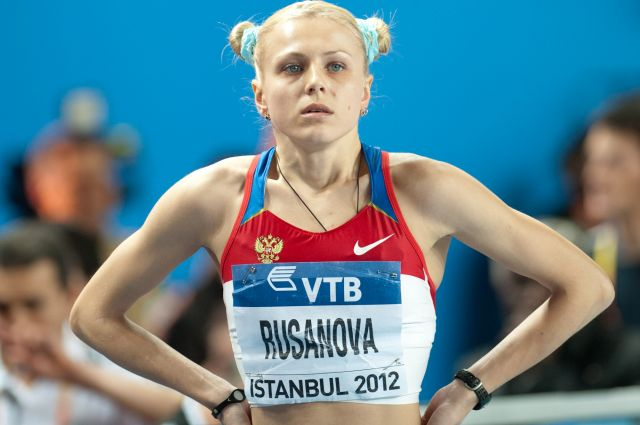
Yuliya Stepanova

In 2010, an employee at the Russian Anti-Doping Agency (RUSADA), Vitaly Stepanov, began sending information to the World Anti-Doping Agency (WADA) alleging that RUSADA was enabling systemic doping in athletics. He said that he sent two hundred emails and fifty letters over the course of three years. In December 2012, Darya Pishchalnikova sent an email to WADA containing details of an alleged state-run doping program in Russia. According to The New York Times, the email reached three top WADA officials but the agency decided not to open an inquiry but instead forwarded her email to Russian sports officials. In April 2013, having failed a doping test for the second time (after a previous two-year doping ban in 2008–2010), Pishchalnikova was banned by the Russian Athletics Federation (RusAF) for ten years, in a move that was likely in retaliation. Her results from May 2012 were annulled, thus setting her on track to lose her Olympic medal. British journalist Nick Harris said that he contacted the IOC with allegations about Grigory Rodchenkov's laboratory in Moscow in early July 2013.

According to Stepanov, "Even at WADA there were people who didn't want this story out," but he said that a person at the organization put him in contact with the German broadcaster ARD. WADA's chief investigator Jack Robertson believed that the organization was reluctant to take action and that media attention was necessary, so he obtained the permission of WADA's director-general, David Howman, to approach an investigative reporter called Hajo Seppelt, who had previously reported on doping in East Germany and other countries. In December 2014, ARD aired Seppelt's documentary, "Geheimsache Doping: 'Wie Russland seine Sieger macht'" ("The Doping Secret: 'How Russia Creates its Champions'"), which uncovered alleged Russian state involvement in systematic doping, describing it as "East German-style". In the documentary, Stepanov and his wife Yuliya Stepanova (née Rusanova), claimed that Russian athletics officials had supplied banned substances in exchange for 5% of an athlete's earnings and had also falsified tests in cooperation with doping control officers. It included conversations that had been secretly recorded by Stepanova, e.g. Russian athlete Mariya Savinova saying that contacts at a Moscow drug-testing laboratory had covered up her doping. Russian long-distance runner Liliya Shobukhova allegedly paid €450,000 to cover up her positive doping result. According to the allegations, Dr. Sergei Portugalov of the Institute for Physical Culture, who stands accused of organising state-sponsored doping in the Soviet Union, dating back to the early 1980s, was also involved in the recent Russian doping programme.

=== 2015 ===
In January 2015, then-All-Russia Athletic Federation (ARAF) President Valentin Balakhnichev resigned as treasurer of the International Association of Athletics Federations (IAAF).

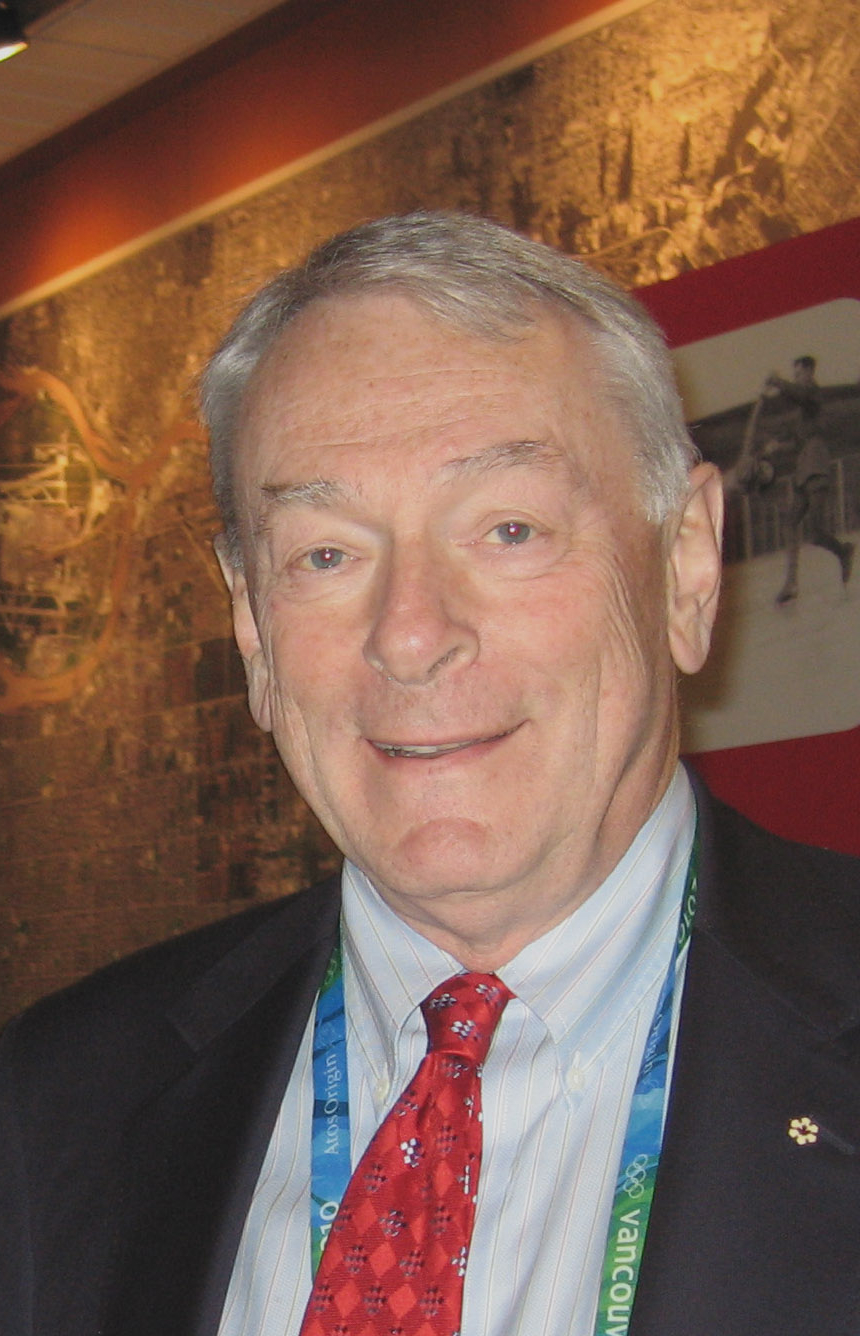
Dick Pound led the 2015 WADA investigation and became a vocal critic of the IOC's indecision

In response to the ARD documentary, WADA commissioned an investigation headed by former anti-doping agency President Dick Pound, the report of which was published on 9 November 2015. The 335-page document, described as "damning" by The Guardian, reported widespread doping and large-scale cover-ups by the Russian authorities. It stated that the Federal Security Service (FSB) had regularly visited and questioned laboratory staff and instructed some of them not to cooperate with the WADA investigation. Two staff members said that they suspected that the offices and telephones were bugged. The report recommended that ARAF be declared non-compliant with respect to the World Anti-Doping Code and that the IOC should not accept any 2016 Summer Olympics entries from ARAF until compliance was reached.

A day later, WADA suspended the Moscow Anti-doping Center, prohibiting the laboratory "from carrying out any WADA-related anti-doping activities including all analyses of urine and blood samples". On 13 November, the IAAF council voted 22–1 in favour of prohibiting Russia from world track and field events with immediate effect. Under other penalties against the ARAF, Russia has been also prohibited from hosting the 2016 World Race Walking Team Championships (Cheboksary) and 2016 World Junior Championships (Kazan), and ARAF must entrust doping cases to Court of Arbitration for Sport. ARAF accepted the indefinite IAAF suspension and did not request a hearing. ARAF's efforts towards regaining full IAAF membership will be monitored by a five-person IAAF team. On 18 November 2015 WADA suspended RUSADA, meaning that Russia does not have a functioning NADO for any sport.

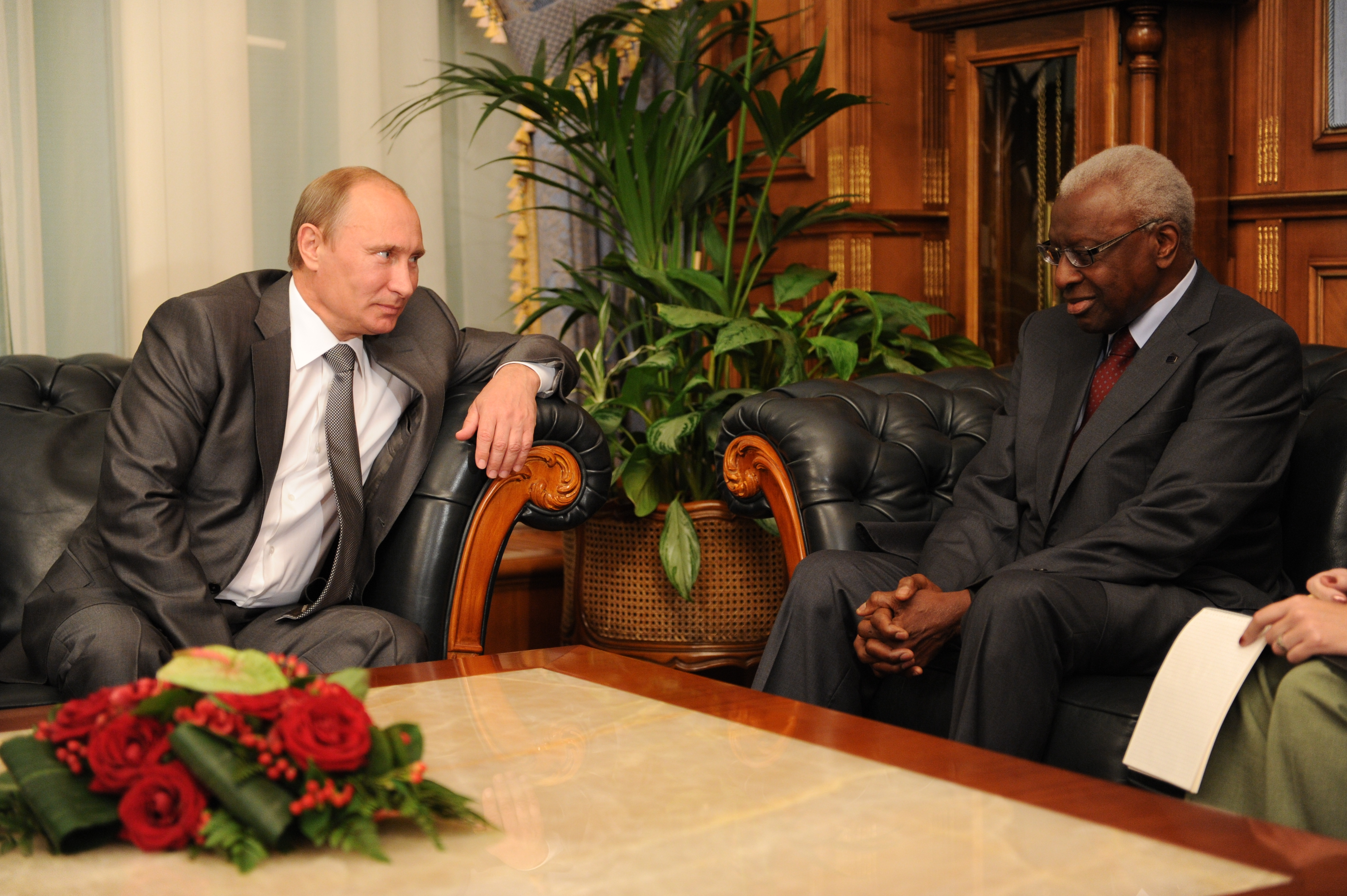
Vladimir Putin and Lamine Diack

In November, France began a criminal investigation into former IAAF president Lamine Diack, alleging that he accepted a 1 million euro bribe from the ARAF in 2011 to cover up positive doping results of at least six Russian athletes.

=== 2016 ===
==== January to May 2016 ====
In January 2016, the IAAF gave lifetime bans to the former head of the Russian athletics federation, Valentin Balakhnichev, and a top Russian coach, Aleksey Melnikov.

In mid-January, WADA released the second report by its independent commission. The following month, the United Kingdom Anti-Doping (UKAD) agency was tasked to oversee testing in Russia.

Two former directors of RUSADA, Vyacheslav Sinev and Nikita Kamaev, both died unexpectedly in February 2016. The Sunday Times reported that Kamaev had approached the newspaper shortly before his death planning to publish a book on "the true story of sport pharmacology and doping in Russia since 1987". Grigory Rodchenkov, the director of a prominent laboratory who has been described by WADA as "the heart of Russian doping", was fired by Russian authorities and fled in fear of his safety to the United States, where he shared information with the help of filmmaker Bryan Fogel, which was documented in the film Icarus.

In March, German broadcaster ARD aired a documentary called "Russia's Red Herrings", alleging that competitors were alerted about testing plans and offered banned substances by individuals at RUSADA and ARAF. According to a May 2016 report in The New York Times, whistleblower Grigory Rodchenkov said that doping experts collaborated with Russia's intelligence service on a state-sponsored doping programme in which urine samples were switched through a "mouse hole" in the laboratory's wall. Tamper-resistant bottles were opened in a nearby building and the urine samples were replaced with athletes' urine taken months in advance. Rodchenkov said that at least fifteen medalists at the 2014 Winter Olympics were involved. On 19 May, WADA appointed Richard McLaren to lead an investigation into the 2014 Winter Olympics in Sochi.

On 15 March, the International Olympic Committee (IOC) announced that they were re-analyzing stored urine samples from the 2008 and 2012 Olympics using more advanced analytical methods to detect banned substances that would have gone unnoticed at the time of competition. Specific sports and countries were targeted, including in particular competitors likely to compete in Rio de Janeiro who also competed in London 2012 and Beijing 2008. Participants from the 2006 and 2010 Winter Olympics were also being targeted as urine samples can only be stored for 10 years. The re-analysis programme would eventually conclude in November 2017.

Away from the Olympics, Russian heavyweight boxer Alexander Povetkin and tennis player Maria Sharapova would both fail drug tests in March and May respectively, both testing positive for Meldonium. Russian-Finnish footballer Roman Eremenko would also fail a drugs test later on in the year.

==== June 2016 ====
An ARD documentary in June 2016 implicated Russian sports minister Vitaly Mutko in covering up doping by a football player at FK Krasnodar. In the same month, IAAF deputy general secretary Nick Davies was provisionally suspended over allegations that he took money to delay naming Russian athletes. According to the BBC, emails from July 2013 showed that Davies had discussed how to delay or soften an announcement on Russians who had tested positive.

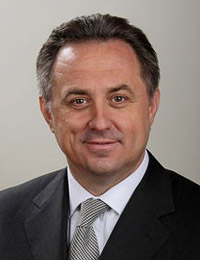
Vitaly Mutko, The Minister of Sport, Tourism and Youth of Russia

In June, WADA released a report stating that the work of its Doping Control Officers (DCO) had been limited by a "significant amount of unavailable competitor reports and missed tests", insufficient or incorrect competitor location information, and little information about the location or date of competitions. Some competitors named military cities requiring special permission to enter as their location and some national championships, including Olympic qualifiers, were held in cities with restricted access due to civil conflicts, preventing testing of the competitors. WADA also reported intimidation of DCOs by armed Federal Security Service (FSB) agents; "significant delays" before being allowed to enter venues; consistent monitoring by security staff; delays in receiving competitor lists; and opening of sample packages by Russian customs. 90% of Russian competitors did not respond or "emphatically" refused when WADA requested to interview them as part of its investigation. Director-general David Howman stated, "It was the very right time for those who considered themselves clean [to approach WADA]. They had nine months, plenty of time, and none came forward."

On 17 June, the IAAF Council held an extraordinary meeting "principally to give the Russian Athletics Federation (RusAF) a further opportunity to satisfy the Reinstatement Conditions for IAAF Membership". A task force chaired by Rune Andersen recommended against reinstating Russia after reporting that criteria had not been met and that there were "detailed allegations, which are already partly substantiated, that the Russian authorities, far from supporting the anti-doping effort, have in fact orchestrated systematic doping and the covering up of adverse analytical findings". The IAAF voted unanimously to uphold its ban.

A week later, the International Weightlifting Federation (IWF) decided to give a one-year ban to Russia, along with two other countries; on 3 August 2016 the IOC ratified the decision, and Russia's weightlifting team missed the 2016 Summer Olympics.

==== July 2016 ====
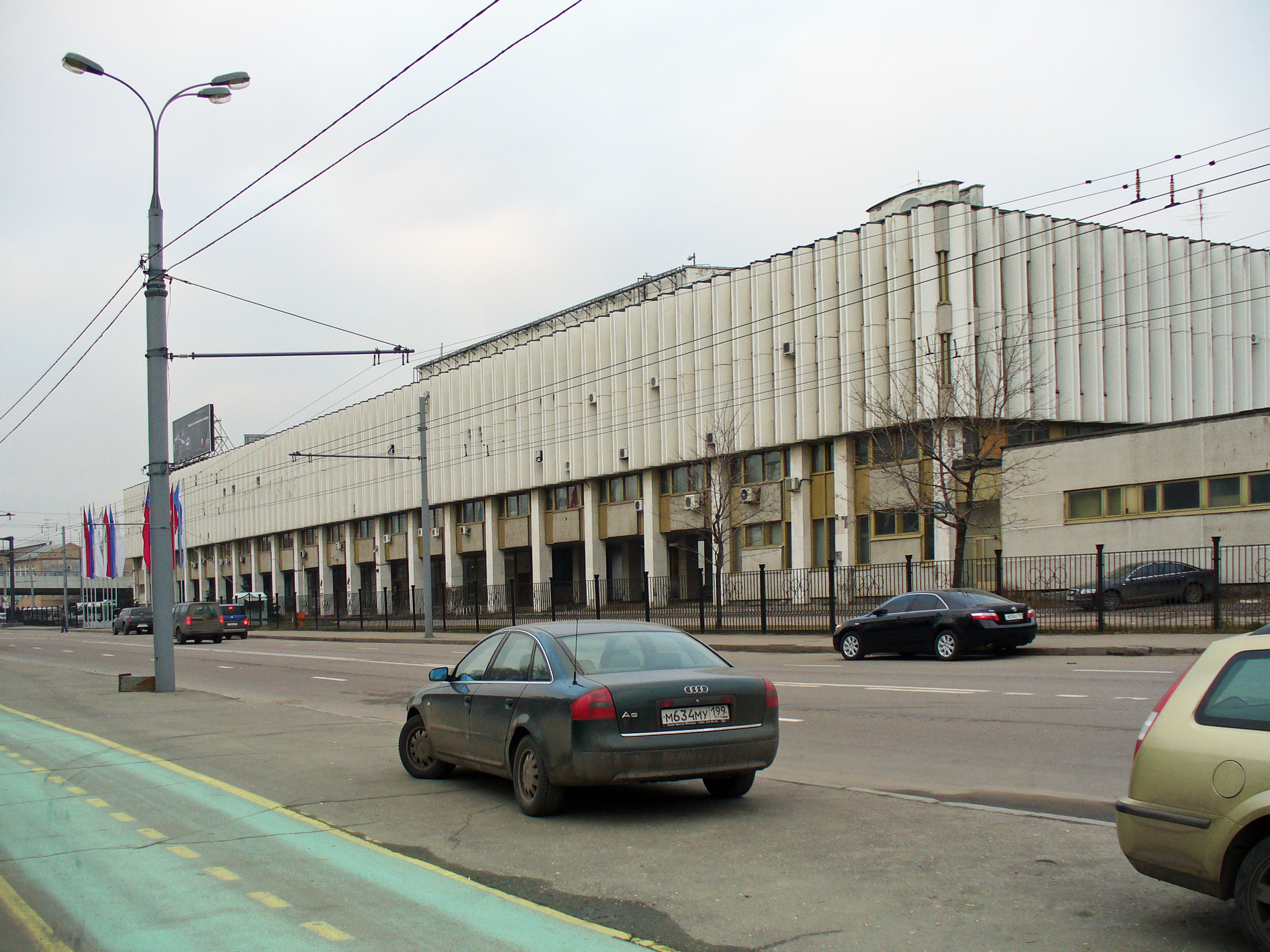
Headquarters of the Russian Olympic Committee in Moscow

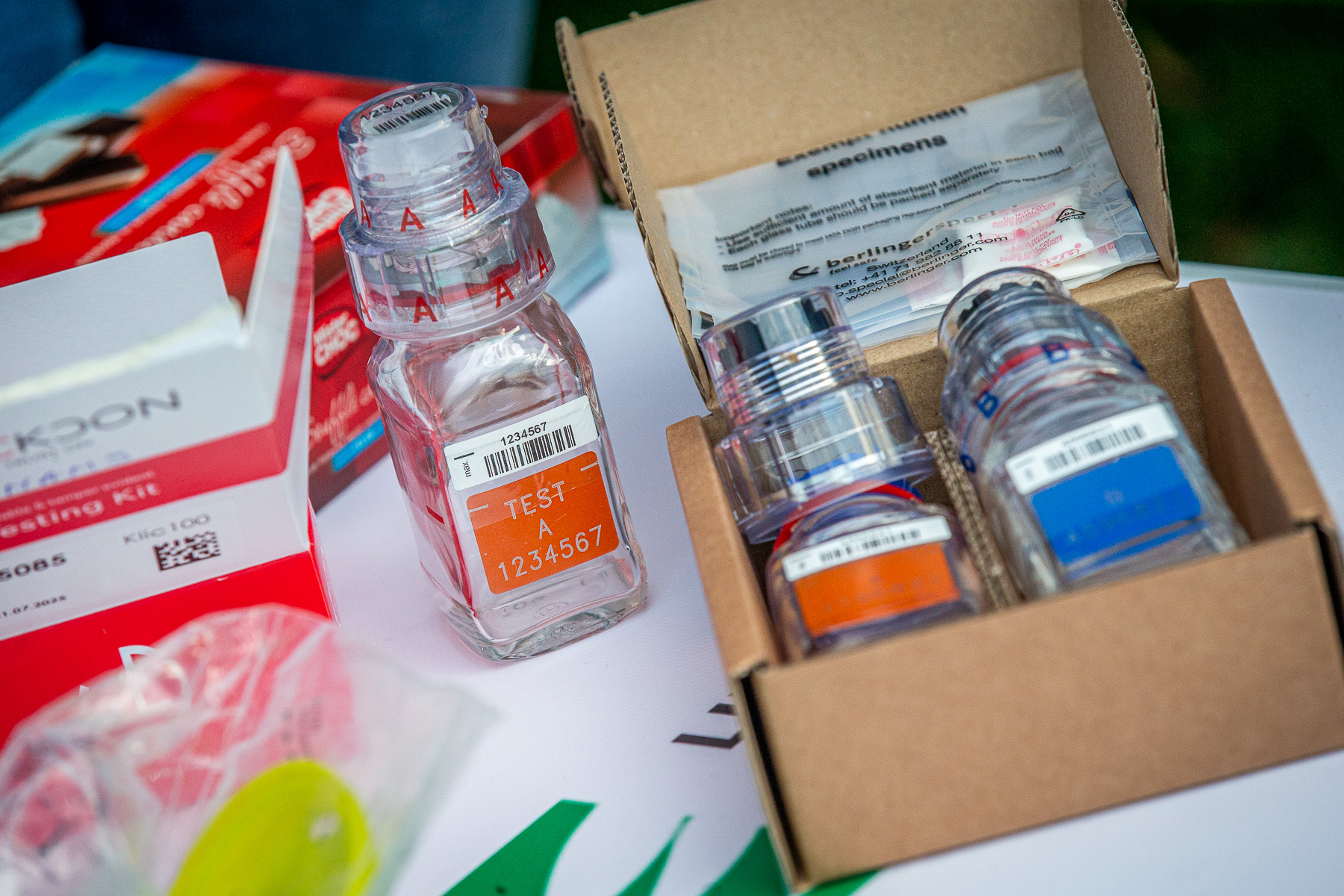
BEREG-KIT doping sampling security bottles

On 18 July 2016, Richard McLaren, a Canadian attorney retained by WADA to investigate Rodchenkov's allegations, published a 97-page report covering significant state-sponsored doping in Russia. Although limited by a 57-day time frame, the investigation found corroborating evidence after conducting witness interviews, reviewing thousands of documents, analysis of hard drives, forensic analysis of urine sample collection bottles, and laboratory analysis of individual competitor samples, with "more evidence becoming available by the day". The report concluded that it was shown "beyond a reasonable doubt" that Russia's Ministry of Sport, the Centre of Sports Preparation of the National Teams of Russia, the Federal Security Service (FSB), and the WADA-accredited laboratory in Moscow had "operated for the protection of doped Russian competitors" within a "state-directed failsafe system" using "the disappearing positive [test] methodology" (DPM) after the country's poor medal count during the 2010 Winter Olympic Games in Vancouver. McLaren stated that urine samples were opened in Sochi in order to swap them "without any evidence to the untrained eye". The official producer of BEREG-KIT security bottles used for anti-doping tests, Berlinger Group, stated, "We have no knowledge of the specifications, the methods or the procedures involved in the tests and experiments conducted by the McLaren Commission."

According to the McLaren report, the DPM operated from "at least late 2011 to August 2015". It was used on 643 positive samples, a number that the authors consider "only a minimum" due to limited access to Russian records. The system covered up positive results in a wide range of sports:

- Athletics (139)
- Weightlifting (117)
- Non-Olympic sports (37)
- Paralympic sport (35)
- Wrestling (28)
- Canoe (27)
- Cycling (26)
- Skating (24)
- Swimming (18)
- Ice hockey (14)
- Skiing (13)
- Football (11)
- Rowing (11)
- Biathlon (10)
- Bobsleigh (8)
- Judo (8)
- Volleyball (8)
- Boxing (7)
- Handball (7)
- Taekwondo (6)
- Fencing (4)
- Triathlon (4)
- Modern pentathlon (3)
- Shooting (3)
- Beach volleyball (2)
- Curling (2)
- Basketball (1)
- Sailing (1)
- Snowboard (1)
- Table tennis (1)
- Water polo (1)

In response to these findings, WADA announced that RUSADA should be regarded as non-compliant with respect to the World Anti-Doping Code and recommended that Russian participants be banned from competing at the 2016 Summer Olympics. The IOC decided to decline 2016 Summer Olympics accreditation requests by Russian sports ministry officials and any individuals implicated in the report, to begin re-analysis and a full inquiry into Russian competitors at the Sochi Olympics, and to ask sports federations to seek alternative hosts for major events that had been assigned to Russia.

On 21 July 2016, the Court of Arbitration for Sport (CAS) turned down an appeal by the Russian Olympic Committee and 68 Russian competitors. The following day, the International Paralympic Committee began suspension proceedings against the National Paralympic Committee of Russia. On 24 July, the IOC rejected WADA's recommendation to ban Russia from the Summer Olympics and announced that a decision would be made by each sport federation. With each positive decision having to be approved by a CAS arbitrator. WADA's president Craig Reedie said, "WADA is disappointed that the IOC did not heed WADA's Executive Committee recommendations that were based on the outcomes of the McLaren Investigation and would have ensured a straight-forward, strong and harmonized approach." On the IOC's decision to exclude Stepanova, WADA director general Olivier Niggli stated that his agency was "very concerned by the message that this sends whistleblowers for the future".

On 30 July, the IOC announced that a final decision on each competitor would be made by a newly established IOC panel consisting of Uğur Erdener, Claudia Bokel, and Juan Antonio Samaranch Jr.

==== August to September 2016 ====
Originally Russia submitted a list of 389 participants for the Rio Olympics competition. On 7 August 2016, the IOC cleared 278 competitors, while 111 were removed because of the scandal (including 67 athletes removed by IAAF before the IOC's decision).

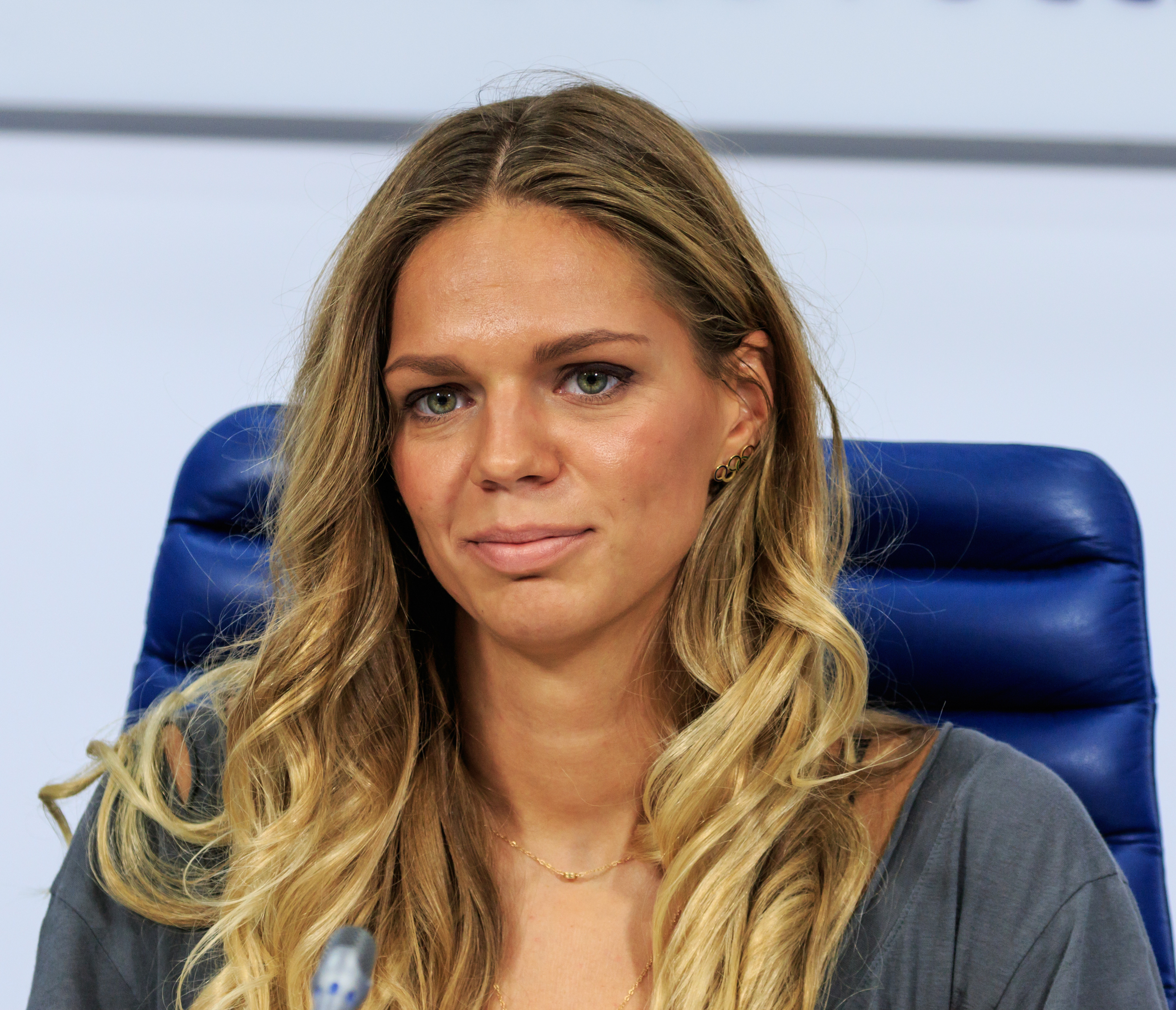
Yulia Efimova, who had been banned for doping, competed in Rio

Critics noted that Kuwaitis were banned from competing under their own flag (for a non-doping related matter) while Russians were permitted to do so. Due to governmental interference, Kuwaiti competitors were permitted to enter only as independent athletes. Dick Pound stated, "It is not a consistent standard which is being applied now. Not all Kuwait competitors banned from competing in Rio under their own flag were supporters of the regime, and not all South African participants were supporters of apartheid, but the greater good called for South Africa to be expelled." Germany's Deutsche Welle wrote of "troublesome questions, like why Kuwait's Olympic federation faced a ban from Rio, while Russia's did not. Kuwait's tiny team [...] was suspended because of improper political conduct by the government; Russia's was not, after systematically organizing a doping program for many of its competitors."

Having sent samples for forensic analysis, the International Paralympic Committee (IPC) found evidence that the Disappearing Positive Methodology (DPM) was in operation at the 2014 Winter Paralympics in Sochi. On 7 August 2016, the IPC's Governing Board voted unanimously to ban the entire Russian team from the 2016 Summer Paralympics, citing the Russian Paralympic Committee's (RPC) inability to enforce the IPC's Anti-Doping Code and the World Anti-Doping Code, which is "a fundamental constitutional requirement". IPC President Sir Philip Craven described the Russian anti-doping system as "entirely compromised" and 18 July 2016 as "one of the darkest days in the history of all sport", and stated that the Russian government had "catastrophically failed its Para athletes". IPC Athletes' Council Chairperson Todd Nicholson said that Russia had used competitors as "pawns" in order to "show global prowess". On 23 August 2016, the Court of Arbitration for Sport dismissed Russia's appeal, stating that the IPC's decision was "made in accordance with the IPC Rules and was proportionate in the circumstances" and that Russia "did not file any evidence contradicting the facts on which the IPC decision was based". The Federal Supreme Court of Switzerland rejected another appeal by Russia, saying that the RPC "needed to demonstrate it had fulfilled its obligations in upholding... anti-doping protocols, and that its interests in an immediate lifting of its suspension outweigh the International Paralympics Committee's interests in fighting doping and in the integrity of athletics. It did not succeed in this in any way." Rejecting an appeal by ten competitors, a German court stated that the IPC had no obligation to allow them to compete and that the committee had "comprehensibly justified" its decision.

In an interview with NRK, WADA's director general Olivier Niggli said that "Russia is threatening us and our informers", mentioning daily hacking attempts and bugging of houses. He said that the agency had "a pretty good suspicion" that the hackers were Russian and that Western governments were already familiar with them. He stated, "I think this will cease if they stop looking at us as an enemy, and instead accept that there is a problem that we must work together to solve. But for the moment they are sending out completely the wrong signals."

==== October to December 2016 ====
In October 2016, Russia's sports minister Vitaly Mutko was promoted to deputy prime minister amid allegations that Mutko had covered up a doping violation.

On 3 November, Russia approved an anti-doping law targeting coaches.

On 15 November, Berlinger introduced a new design for doping sample bottles. A spokesman later said, "We work with forensic specialists from different nations. We want to always stay a little bit ahead of those cheating but you cannot avoid a system like the Russians built up."

On 7 December, Yelena Isinbayeva became the chair of the supervisory board of the Russian Anti-Doping Agency.

On 9 December, McLaren published the second part of his report. The report claimed that from 2011 to 2015, more than 1,000 Russian competitors in various sports (including summer, winter, and Paralympic sports) benefited from the cover-up. However, McLaren later walked back from that assertion when the cases went to court, rephrasing it as not a fact but only a possibility, as recorded on page 68 of the CAS verdict for Alexander Legkov: "Prof. McLaren went on to explain that, in this respect, if his investigation obtained evidence that a particular competitor may have benefited from the scheme, then 'It didn't mean that they did benefit. It didn't mean that they committed [an] anti-doping rule violation.'" Emails indicate that those who might have benefited from a cover-up included five blind powerlifters, who may have been given drugs without their knowledge, and a fifteen-year-old. An IAAF taskforce announced that Russia could not be reinstated because the country still had no functional drug-testing agency and had not accepted the findings of investigations.

=== 2017 ===
==== January to October 2017 ====
In February 2017, All-Russia Athletic Federation vice-president Andrey Silnov held a press conference in Moscow alongside a former Soviet competitor who said that East German successes due to state-sponsored doping are legitimate results of "good pharmacology" and should not be condemned. Later that month, WADA stated that evidence against many individuals named in the McLaren report might be insufficient because the Moscow laboratory had disposed of doping samples and Russian authorities were not answering requests for additional evidence.

An IAAF taskforce chaired by Rune Andersen published an interim report in April. President Sebastian Coe stated, "There is testing but it is still far too limited. The Russian investigative committee is still refusing to hand over competitor biological passport samples for independent testing from labs, we still have got competitors in closed cities that are difficult or impossible to get to, the ongoing employment of coaches from a tainted system, and we have got the head coach of RUSAF effectively refusing to sign their own pledge to clean athletics." The report also noted the case of whistleblower Andrei Dmitriev, who had fled Russia after being threatened with imprisonment. Coe said, "Anyone with information about a system which has failed to protect the goals and aspirations of clean competitors must feel it is safe to speak out." Andersen questioned the selection of Yelena Isinbayeva, who had called for whistleblower Yuliya Stepanova to be "banned for life", as the chair of RUSADA's supervisory board. Andersen stated, "It is difficult to see how this helps to achieve the desired change in culture in track and field, or how it helps to promote an open environment for Russian whistleblowers", noting that Isinbayeva had called a WADA report "groundless" without reading it, publicly criticised whistleblowers (Dmitriev and the Stepanovs), and had not signed a pledge for clean sport or endorsed a Russian anti-doping group.

In September, WADA rejected Russia's claims that WADA should be held responsible for Rodchenkov, noting that Russia had chosen to appoint him as head of the Moscow laboratory. The organisation also stated, "WADA would expect the Russian authorities to take responsibility for this deliberate system of cheating that was uncovered by the McLaren Investigation – as is stipulated within RUSADA's Roadmap to Compliance – rather than continually shifting the blame onto others." Seventeen national anti-doping organisations criticised the IOC for a "continuing refusal to hold Russia accountable for one of the biggest doping scandals in sports history" and "dereliction of duty [sending] a cynical message that those of favored, insider nations within the Olympic Movement will never be punished or held accountable". They stated that cases had been "shut prematurely before the IOC or IFs have obtained complete evidence from the Moscow laboratory or interviewed the relevant witnesses". An additional 20 NADOs have signed on.

==== November to December 2017 ====
In November 2017, the IOC disciplinary commission headed by Denis Oswald imposed its first sanctions after a year-long Sochi investigation. As of 22 December, 43 Russian competitors had been sanctioned and 13 medals had been stripped.

On 10 November, the day after Vladimir Putin accused the U.S. of stirring up problems for Russian competitors, WADA said in a news release that it had obtained an electronic file that contained "all testing data" from January 2012 to August 2015 – thousands of drug screenings run on Russian competitors. The database, which the Russian authorities were unwilling to share with antidoping investigators, arrived through a whistleblower. The head of the Russian Ski Association, Yelena Välbe, told the press that "whistleblowers are traitors to their country" shortly thereafter. Russia's ski team coach went even further and accused Ilia Chernousov (a skier who won a bronze medal in the 50 km freestyle event) of "leaking information" to WADA.

On 11 November, it was revealed that Grigory Rodchenkov had provided new evidence of Russian state-sponsored doping to the IOC, noting that he would consider going public if the Schmid Commission did not give due weight to his evidence in any public findings.

On 16 November, WADA announced that Russia remained non-compliant with its Code. On 26 November, IAAF decided to maintain Russia's ban from international track and field competitions, saying the country had not done enough to tackle doping.

In an interview with the New York Times, Rodchenkov reported that Yuri Nagornykh, the deputy minister of sport, had asked him to incriminate a Ukrainian competitor, Vita Semerenko, during a competition in Moscow leading up to the Olympics. Rodchenkov did not comply, convincing the minister that a retest of the drug sample would show the drugs had been spiked into the sample rather than passed through a human body. "I could not have done this to an innocent athlete," he said. "During my career, I reported many Dirty Samples as clean, but never the other way around."

==== Official sanctions ====
Approved OAR logo

On 5 December 2017, the IOC announced that the Russian Olympic Committee had been suspended with immediate effect from the 2018 Winter Olympics, but their concession was to allow those Russians with no previous drug violations and a consistent history of drug testing to compete under the Olympic Flag as an "Olympic Athlete from Russia" (OAR). Under the terms of the IOC's edict, no Russian government officials were permitted to attend the Games, and neither the Russian flag nor the Russian national anthem would be featured; the Olympic Flag and Olympic Anthem were to be used instead. On 20 December 2017, the IOC proposed an alternative logo for the OAR competitors' uniforms (shown on right). IOC President Thomas Bach said that "after following due process [the IOC] has issued proportional sanctions for this systematic manipulation while protecting the clean competitors."

As of January 2018, the IOC had identified 43 Russian competitors from the 2014 Winter Olympics in Sochi that it intended to ban from competing in the 2018 Winter Olympics and all other future Olympic Games as part of the Oswald Commission. All but one of those competitors appealed against their bans to the Court of Arbitration for Sport (CAS). The court overturned the sanctions on 28 of the appellants, resulting in their Sochi medals and results being reinstated, but the court ruled that there was sufficient evidence against eleven of the competitors to uphold their Sochi sanctions. The IOC issued a statement saying "the result of the CAS decision does not mean that athletes from the group of 28 will be invited to the Games. Not being sanctioned does not automatically confer the privilege of an invitation" and that "this [case] may have a serious impact on the future fight against doping". The IOC found it imperative to point out that the CAS Secretary General "insisted that the CAS decision does not mean that these 28 competitors are innocent" and that they would consider an appeal against the court's decision. The court also downgraded the punishment by deciding that the 39 competitors should only be banned from the 2018 Games, not all future Olympic Games. The remaining three Russian competitors did not appeal their decisions until March 2020 and in September 2020, two of them were cleared of doping whilst the remaining one was found guilty, however all three had their life bans overturned. After the partially successful appeal, 47 Russian competitors and coaches launched a further appeal to the CAS, in a final attempt to secure an invitation to the Games. This appeal was dismissed on 9 February 2018, the day of the opening ceremony, a decision that was welcomed by the IOC.

An original pool of 500 Russians was put forward for consideration for the 2018 Games and 111 of them were immediately eliminated from the pool; this included the 43 competitors who had been sanctioned by the Oswald Commission. The remaining 389 were required to meet a number of pre-games conditions, such as a further round of tests and re-analysis of stored samples, and they would only be considered for invitation to the Games providing these requirements were met. The final number of neutral Russian competitors that were invited to compete was 169. However, speed skater Olga Graf chose not to compete, stating that "the sport has become a bargaining chip in dirty political games", bringing the eventual total to 168.

==== Reaction in Russia ====
In the past, the President of Russia, Vladimir Putin, and other government officials had stated that it would be a humiliation for Russia if its competitors were not allowed to compete at the Olympics under the Russian flag. However, despite rumours to the contrary, his spokesman Dmitry Peskov later revealed that no boycott had been discussed leading up to the IOC's announcement. After the IOC decision was made public, Ramzan Kadyrov, the Head of Chechnya, announced that no Chechen competitors would be allowed to compete under a neutral flag.

On 6 December 2017, Putin confirmed that the Russian government would not prevent any of its competitors from participating at the 2018 Games as individuals, despite there being calls from other leading Russian politicians for a boycott. Gennady Zyuganov, leader of the Communist Party of the Russian Federation, put forward a proposal to send fans to the Games with a Soviet Victory Banner. Russian Minister of Foreign Affairs, Sergey Lavrov, commented that the United States "fears honest competition", affirming Vladimir Putin's position that the United States used its influence within the IOC to "orchestrate the doping scandal".

According to Komsomolskaya Pravda, 86% of the Russian population opposed participation in the Winter Olympics under a neutral flag.

Many Russians believed that the IOC was retaliating against Russia for their discriminatory anti-gay law which provoked considerable controversy with the IOC during the 2014 Winter Olympics when it was hosted in Sochi, Russia.

=== 2018 ===
==== January to February 2018 ====
In January 2018, it was reported that all leading Russian competitors avoided meeting doping officers and passing anti-doping tests in a track and field competition in Irkutsk.

During the Pyeongchang Winter Olympics in February, two Russian competitors from the Olympic Athletes from Russia (OAR) delegation failed doping tests and were disqualified: curler Aleksandr Krushelnitckii who won a bronze medal in the mixed doubles event; and bobsleigh pilot Nadezhda Sergeeva who finished twelfth in the two-woman event. The IOC expressed their disappointment at the positive doping tests and stated that the OAR team would consequently not be allowed to parade under the Russian flag at the closing ceremony.

Despite the two disqualifications, the IOC announced on 28 February that it had chosen to reinstate Russia's Olympic membership, just days after the end of the Winter Games, as no more cases of doping had been found in the delegation. The surprise decision to lift the suspension provoked anger among the international sporting community. The IOC had planned all along to reinstate Russia after the Games provided there were no more failed tests. Their statement read "The suspension of the Russian Olympic Committee is automatically lifted with immediate effect."

==== May to August 2018 ====
In the buildup to the 2018 FIFA World Cup hosted by Russia, lab director and whistleblower Grigory Rodchenkov said that he recognised one of Russia's players as a doper in one of his own doping programmes. FIFA had opened an inquiry into Russian doping in football after the McLaren report was published with 33 Russian footballers named in it, but said in May that they had found 'insufficient evidence' of doping but said that some cases with players unrelated to the World Cup were ongoing. The tournament eventually concluded with no players failing a drugs test. A few months after the tournament had concluded in September, the father of Russian player Denis Cheryshev said that his son had been taking growth hormone during the tournament. He was later cleared of doping by anti-doping authorities.

On 20 July, the Athletics Integrity Unit (AIU) released details of 120 doping cases with some 85 of the cases involving Olympic and World Championships medallists and almost half (47.5%) involving Russians. On 27 July, 10 days before the start of the 2018 European Athletics Championships, the IAAF announced that despite making improvements in key areas, Russia would still remain suspended from international athletics competitions. 29 Russian athletes still competed in the championships as Authorised Neutral Athletes, and Russia eventually topped the medal table of the inaugural European Championships.

==== September 2018 ====
The World-Anti Doping Agency voted on 20 September whether or not to re-instate the Russian Anti-Doping Agency after they were suspended in 2015. A WADA compliance review committee had recommended that RUSADA be re-instated, which sparked anger from international competitors and officials. One of the members of the six-person review committee, Beckie Scott, the chair of WADA'S athletes commission, left her role on the committee in protest over the recommendation to reinstate RUSADA and the vice president of the agency, Linda Helleland, said that she would vote against their re-admission. A group of competitors from UK-Anti-Doping had earlier called for Russia to remain banned until it had overhauled its Anti-Doping System, saying that Russia's re-admission would be "a catastrophe for clean sport" and a member of US Anti-Doping Agency was quoted as saying 'frankly, it stinks to high heaven'. The former head of the Moscow laboratory turned whistle-blower Grigory Rodchenkov said that lifting Russia's ban would be a 'catastrophe'.

WADA had insisted that Russia meet two criteria before RUSADA could be re-admitted; accept the findings of the McLaren Report and grant access to Moscow's anti-doping laboratory. The compliance review committee had reviewed a letter from the Russian Sports Ministry that said it had 'sufficiently acknowledged the issues identified in Russia' and that they agree to accept the two remaining conditions'.

WADA voted unanimously to re-instate the Russian Anti-Doping Agency at their congress in the Seychelles, going against the wishes of numerous national Anti-Doping agencies around the world. The lawyer for whistle-blower Grigory Rodchenkov called it "the greatest treachery against clean athletes in Olympic history" whilst US Anti-Doping Agency head Travis Tygart said the decision is "bewildering and inexplicable" and a "devastating blow to the world's clean competitors". The decision received so much criticism that the head of WADA, Craig Reedie, had to publicly defend the decision as he came under mounting criticism.

With RUSADA now re-instated, the Russian Athletics Federation launched a legal challenge to the IAAF to overturn their ban from athletics competitions from which they were still suspended. The IAAF, however, refused the request, which was later withdrawn by the Russian athletics federation. By 26 September, 77 Russians were serving doping bans in the sport of athletics including 72 athletes and five coaches and athlete support personnel.

==== November to December 2018 ====
It was announced in November that the International Olympic Committee would further re-analyse stored samples from the 2012 Olympics, testing for all banned substances. This came after 48 adverse analytical findings were found in previous re-analysis of samples with 22 of them being Russian

On 14 December, The i newspaper reported from Moscow that officials at the Russian Ministry of Sport were still reluctant to cooperate fully with WADA over turning over the testing data from its anti-doping laboratory. WADA subsequently released a statement that said their Expert Team had flown to extract the data. Later, it emerged that WADA was unsuccessful in retrieving the data because their equipment had allegedly not been properly certified.

The reinstatement of RUSADA prompted allegations of bullying and a call for reform within the World Anti-Doping Agency, however the IAAF decided to uphold Russia's suspension from athletics into 2019 with 63 Russians cleared to compete as neutral athletes for the year. A team of five WADA experts traveled to Moscow on 17 December expected to be given full access to the laboratory, but on arrival, they were refused full access which put RUSADA on the brink of being suspended once more with their president Yuri Ganus appealing personally to Putin for a resolution.

=== 2019 ===
==== January 2019 ====
WADA had set Russia a strict deadline to hand over data from their Moscow laboratory by 31 December, a deadline which they evidently missed. There were calls for the WADA compliance review committee to meet immediately to consider their next steps, however they decided to meet much later on 14 January which caused anger among the international community with 16 national anti-doping bodies calling for Russia's suspension once more. WADA president Dick Pound described the reaction to their decision as like a "lynch mob".

WADA eventually gained full access to the Moscow laboratory on 10 January, 10 days after the initial deadline. The WADA president described it as a "major breakthrough for clean sport" and said that they were now starting their second phase of authentication and review of the data that had been collected to make sure that it had not been compromised and to build strong cases against Russian competitors that might have doped. WADA eventually managed to retrieve 2262 samples from the Moscow lab. Despite missing the deadline, RUSADA was still deemed compliant and was not punished. The Institute of National Anti-Doping Organisations (iNADO) said that "Russia has been granted more chances and, ultimately, leniency than any individual competitor or small country could expect to receive. This is very troubling".

==== February to March 2019 ====
It was announced on 8 February that the International Paralympic Committee would now re-instate Russia by 15 March after they were suspended in July 2016. They stated that 69 of the 70 reinstatement criteria had been met with the last criterion being to accept the findings of the McLaren report. Meanwhile, Russia's ban in athletics was upheld by the IAAF 'until further notice' stating that there were two outstanding issues that needed to be resolved.

On 19 March, France issued arrest warrants for two former Russian athletics officials as part of an investigation into a doping cover-up. The former head of Russian athletics Valentin Balakhnichev and the ex-coach of the Russian athletics team Alexei Melnikov, who were both banned from the sport for life in 2016, were targeted.

==== June to July 2019 ====
Russia's 2008 Olympic high jump champion Andrey Silnov stepped down from his position as the vice-president of the Russian Athletics Federation in June after it was reported that he was under investigation for a possible doping violation following a re-analysis of his sample from 2013. It was also reported that seven Russian track and field athletes, including athletes from the national team, were caught training in Kyrgyzstan with Vladimir Kazarin, a coach who was banned from the sport for life in 2017 for doping offences. With all of that in mind, Russia was in danger of remaining suspended for the 2019 World Athletics Championships in September after the IAAF voted to uphold their ban, the 11th time they had done so. In July Reuters reported that two Olympic Russian boxers competed in 2018 while serving doping bans applied by RUSADA. Reuters said this indicated an inconsistency in Russia's reform of its anti-doping practices. After Reuters notified it of the two cases RUSADA said it would investigate.

The first cases of possible Anti-Doping violations against Russian competitors' samples taken from the Moscow Laboratory were handed over to the individual sporting federations in July. WADA said that the data of 43 competitors had been handed over out of a target pool of 298. The first sporting federation to suspend competitors from the data received was the International Weightlifting Federation who suspended 12 Russian weightlifters including Olympic, World and European medalists.

==== September to November 2019 ====
On 21 September, it was widely reported that some of the data retrieved from the Moscow laboratory may have been manipulated and tampered with before it was retrieved by the World Anti-Doping Agency. This meant that Russia would remain suspended from the then-upcoming 2019 World Athletics Championships, and faced a possible ban from hosting and competing in all major sporting events including the upcoming 2020 Olympics and possibly the 2022 Olympics, 2022 FIFA World Cup, 2023 FIFA Women's World Cup and the 2024 Olympics.

Two months later, on 21 November, a number of Russian athletics officials were suspended for obstructing and failing to co-operate with an investigation into the whereabouts of high-jumper Danil Lysenko. President of the Russian Athletics Federation Dmitry Shlyakhtin was suspended along with 6 others associated with RusAF, including the athlete and his coach.

==== Doping ban ====
WADA then recommended that Russia be declared non-compliant once more and banned from hosting sporting events for four years. On 9 December, WADA banned Russia from major international sporting events for four years, on charges of tampering with doping-related reports. Russia will be barred from hosting, participating in, or establishing bids for international sporting events during this period. As before, WADA will allow cleared Russian competitors to compete neutrally, but not under the Russian flag. This will not affect Russia's co-hosting of UEFA Euro 2020, as WADA does not recognize UEFA as a "major event organization" covered by the ban. In regard to this sanction, WADA president Craig Reedie said that "For too long, Russian doping has detracted from clean sport". He also added that "Russia was afforded every opportunity to get its house in order and rejoin the global anti-doping community for the good of its competitors and of the integrity of sport, but it chose instead to continue in its stance of deception and denial". Russia appealed the decision to the Court of Arbitration for Sport.

=== 2020 ===
==== January to April 2020 ====
In January 2020, WADA suspended the Moscow laboratory from carrying out its only remaining accreditation, analysis of blood samples. The Moscow laboratory had been allowed to carry out analysis of blood samples since May 2016 as "practically impossible for laboratories to interfere with the blood variables of samples due to the nature of the analytical equipment and the athlete biological passport principles in place".

In March, World Athletics announced that no more than 10 Russian track and field athletes would be allowed to compete as neutrals at the summer's Olympics. It also fined the Russian Athletics Federation $10 million due to the obstruction and forgery of documents relating to the doping case of Danil Lysenko and stated that all Russian neutrals would be banned if half of the fine was not paid by 1 July. The 2020 Summer Olympics were later delayed until 2021 due to the ongoing COVID-19 pandemic.

On 30 April, WADA announced that they had completed their 'painstaking' investigation of the 298 Russian competitors whose data they had received from the Moscow laboratory in January 2019. The first data was handed over in July and a total of 27 international sporting federations and one major event organisation received the data in order to decide on possible anti-doping violations being brought forward.

==== July to December 2020 ====
The Russian athletics federation failed to pay half of its $10 million World Athletics fine by 1 July. RusAF's chief, Yevgeny Yurchenko, stated that the federation did not have the sufficient funds to pay the fine. RusAF avoided expulsion from World Athletics after the Russian Sports Minister Oleg Matytsin made an 'unconditional' guarantee to pay the fine by a new deadline of 15 August. Russia paid the fine of $5 million and $1.31 million in costs three days before the set deadline and avoided expulsion by doing so.

In a case that was described as 'almost identical' to that of Danil Lysenko, Russian figure skater Maria Sotskova was handed a 10-year ban from the sport by RUSADA for submitting a forged medical document in relation to her three missed doping tests and the presence of a prohibited substance in her body.

The Court of Arbitration for Sport, on review of Russia's appeal of its case from WADA, ruled on 17 December to reduce the penalty that WADA had placed. Instead of banning Russia from sporting events, the ruling allowed Russia to participate at the Olympics and other international events, but for a period of two years, athletes and teams who were to represent Russia are not allowed to use the Russian name, flag, or anthem, and are instead required to present themselves as "Neutral Athlete" or "Neutral Team". The ruling does allow for their uniforms to display "Russia" on the uniform but only up to equal predominance as the "Neutral Athlete/Team" designation, as well as the use of the Russian flag colors within the uniform's design.

However, the ruling also clarified that the sanctions do extend to any official World Championship and, subsequently, racing drivers from Russia are unable to officially represent Russia in FIA-sanctioned World Championships as long as the sanctions are in place.

=== 2021 ===
The IOC announced on 19 February 2021 that Russia would compete in both the 2020 Summer Olympics (which was postponed to 2021 due to the COVID-19 pandemic in Russia) and 2022 Winter Olympics under the acronym "ROC", after the name of the Russian Olympic Committee. However, the name of the committee itself in full could not be used to refer to the delegation. The ROC team would be represented by the flag of the Russian Olympic Committee. On 22 April, the IOC approved a fragment of Pyotr Tchaikovsky's Piano Concerto No. 1 to be used in place of the Russian national anthem.

At the 2020 Summer Olympics, no more than ten Russians were allowed to compete in the Athletics competition and no more than two Russians (one male and one female) were allowed to compete in the Weightlifting competition due to doping. Two qualified Russian rowers, Nikita Morgachyov and Pavel Sorin, were replaced in the rowing team after testing positive for the banned substance Meldonium and two qualified Russian swimmers, Veronika Andrusenko and Aleksandr Kudashev, were removed from the swimming team based on evidence from the Moscow Anti-Doping laboratory. On appeal to CAS, Andrusenko and Kudashev were reinstated to the swimming squad and cleared to compete. Only one doping violation related to Russians competing at the Olympics was recorded. Triathlete Igor Andreyevich Polyanski tested positive for Erythropoietin (EPO) in an out of competition test five days before he competed at the Olympics.

=== 2022 ===
The medal ceremony for the Olympic figure skating team event, where the ROC won gold, originally scheduled for 8 February, was delayed over what International Olympic Committee (IOC) spokesperson Mark Adams described as a situation that required "legal consultation" with the International Skating Union. Several media outlets reported on 9 February that the issue was over a positive test for trimetazidine by the ROC's Kamila Valieva, which was officially confirmed on 11 February. Valieva's sample in question was taken by the Russian Anti-Doping Agency (RUSADA) at the 2022 Russian Figure Skating Championships on 25 December, but the sample was not analyzed at the World Anti-Doping Agency (WADA) laboratory where it was sent for testing until 8 February, one day after the team event concluded.

Valieva was assessed a provisional suspension after her positive result. But upon appeal, she was cleared by RUSADA's independent Disciplinary Anti-Doping Committee (DAC) on 9 February, just a day after receiving the provisional suspension. Following formal appeals lodged by the IOC, the International Skating Union (ISU), and WADA to review RUSADA DAC's decision, the CAS was expected to hear the case on 13 February with a decision scheduled for announcement on 14 February ahead of her scheduled appearance in the women's singles event beginning 15 February. Due to Valieva being a minor at the time, as well as being classified as a "protected person" under WADA guidelines, RUSADA and the IOC announced on 12 February that they would broaden the scope of their respective investigations to include members of her entourage (e.g., coaches, team doctors, etc.).

On 14 February, the CAS ruled that Valieva would be allowed to compete in the women’s single event, deciding that preventing her from competing "would cause her irreparable harm in the circumstances", though her gold medal in the team event was still under consideration. The favorable decision from the court was made in part due to her age, as minor athletes are subject to different rules than adult athletes.

=== 2023 ===
On 23 March 2023, World Athletics announced that Russia's doping suspension had been lifted almost seven and a half years after they were suspended in November 2015. However, Russian athletes would still be banned due to the ongoing Russian invasion of Ukraine.

== International competitions ==
=== Russian hosting ===
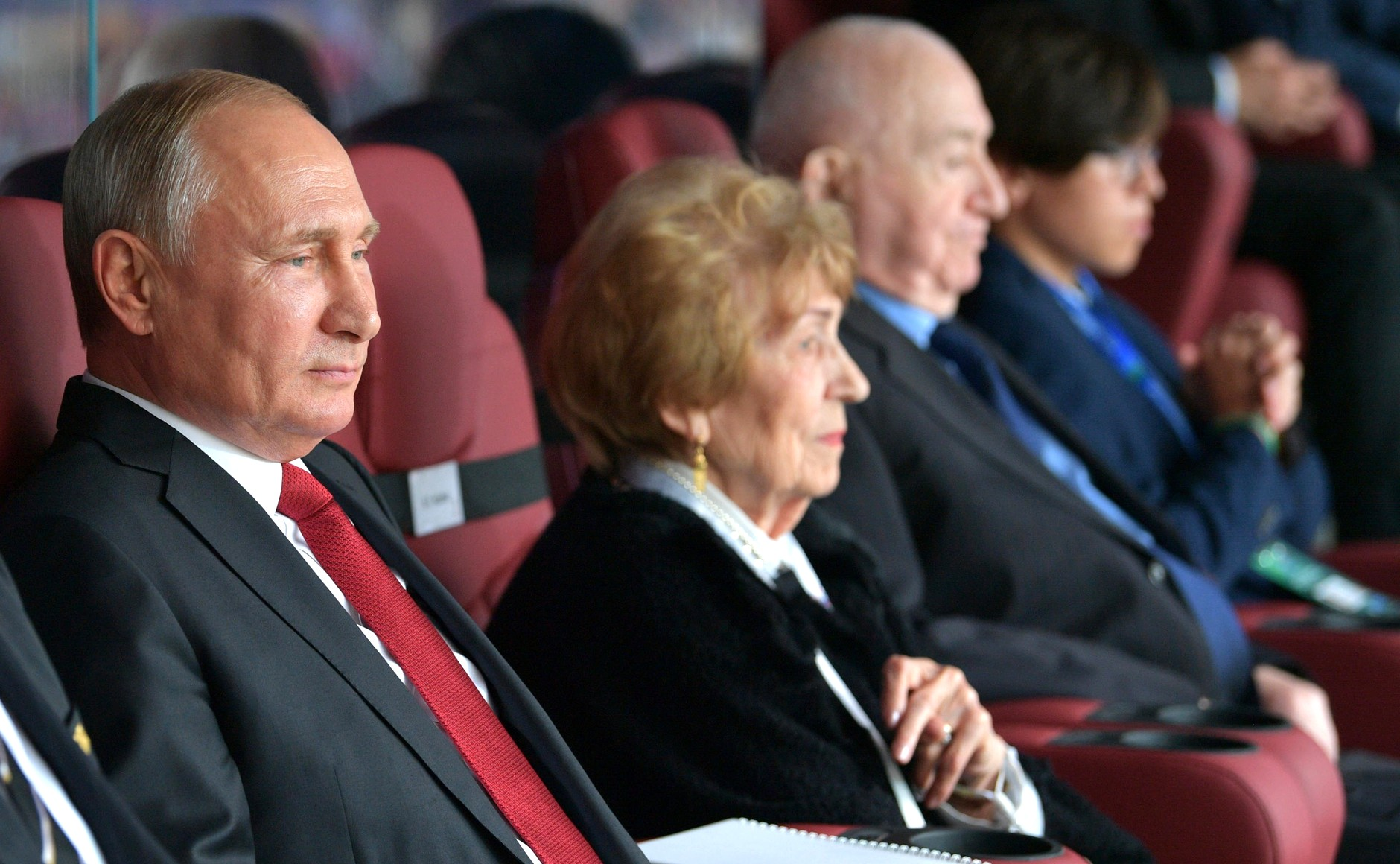
Vladimir Putin at the 2018 FIFA World Cup opening ceremony

Although the IOC stated in July 2016 that it would ask sports federations to seek alternative hosts, Russia has retained hosting rights for some major international sports events, including the 2017 FIFA Confederations Cup, 2018 FIFA World Cup, and 2019 Winter Universiade. In September 2016, Russia was awarded hosting rights for the 2021 World Biathlon Championships because the IOC's recommendation did not apply to events that had already been awarded or planned bids from the country.

Olympic medalists Steven Holcomb, Matthew Antoine, Martins Dukurs, and Lizzy Yarnold questioned the decision to hold the FIBT World Championships 2017 in Sochi, with boycotts considered by Austria, Latvia, and South Korea. Latvia's skeleton team confirmed that it would boycott if Sochi remained the host, saying that the "Olympic spirit was stolen in 2014." On 13 December 2016, the International Bobsleigh and Skeleton Federation announced that it would relocate the event. Some competitors were concerned that they might unwittingly ingest a banned substance if the host tampered with food or drinks, while others "were worried about the evidence that Russian laboratories had been opening tamper-proof bottles. If they have opened these bottles to help their competitors, what is to stop them also opening them to tamper with samples from any athlete in the competition?"

Biathlon teams from the Czech Republic and Great Britain decided to boycott a 2016–17 Biathlon World Cup stage in Tyumen. On 22 December 2016, Russia announced it would not host the World Cup event or the 2017 Biathlon Junior World Championships in Ostrov. The same day, the International Skating Union decided to relocate a speed skating event, the 2016–17 ISU Speed Skating World Cup stage in Chelyabinsk, due to "a substantial amount of critical evidence and the uncertainty relating to the attendance of the competitors". Russia was later removed as host of the FIBT World Championships 2017, 2016–17 FIS Cross-Country World Cup final stage and 2021 World Biathlon Championships in Tyumen.

On 22 December 2017, it was reported that FIFA fired Jiri Dvorak, a doctor, who had been investigating doping in Russian football. However, FIFA stated that removal of Dvorak was unrelated to his investigation of doping in Russian sports.

=== Russian participation ===
The IAAF permitted Russians who have undergone testing by non-Russian agencies to compete as neutral athletes. The Russian flag, national colours, and anthem were not allowed to display.

There were calls to ban Russia from participating in the 2018 Winter Olympics and 2018 Winter Paralympics or to allow Russians to compete only as neutrals. Russia would later be allowed to compete as Olympic Athletes from Russia at the former and Neutral Paralympic Athletes at the latter.

Following the CAS ruling in late 2020, the FIA, the international governing body for automobile racing, announced that racing drivers from Russia would not be allowed to represent their country in any world championship series as long as the sanctions are in place, though they are still allowed to participate as neutral competitors.

== Media coverage ==
Russian doping has been featured in several documentaries broadcast in Germany, France, and the United States:

- Geheimsache Doping: Wie Russland seine Sieger macht (The Doping Secret: How Russia Creates Champions), ARD / Das Erste, aired 3 December 2014
- Geheimsache Doping. Im Schattenreich der Leichtathletik (The Doping Secret: The Shadowy World of Athletics), ARD / Das Erste, aired 1 August 2015
- Geheimsache Doping: Russlands Täuschungsmanöver (The Doping Secret: Russia's Red Herrings), ARD / Westdeutscher Rundfunk, aired 6 March 2016
- Russia's Dark Secret, 60 Minutes / CBS News, aired 8 May 2016
- Plus vite, plus haut, plus dopés (Faster, higher, more doped), Arte in partnership with Le Monde, aired 7 June 2016
- Icarus, Netflix, directed by Bryan Fogel, 2017

== Reactions ==
=== International ===
Some sportspeople from other countries have criticised WADA, alleging that the agency has been reluctant to investigate Russia despite multiple tips over several years. WADA officials stated that the agency lacked the authority to carry out its own investigations until 2015. Arne Ljungqvist, WADA's former vice chairman, commented that "WADA always had an excuse as to why they wouldn't move forward. They expected Russia to clean up themselves." In June 2016, The Guardian reported that a letter approved by over twenty competitors' groups from multiple sports and countries as well as the chairs of the IOC's and WADA's athletes committees, Claudia Bokel and Beckie Scott, had been sent to IOC president Thomas Bach and WADA head Craig Reedie; the letter criticised the organisations for inaction and silence until the media became involved and said that competitors' confidence in the anti-doping system had been "shattered".

On 18 July 2016, WADA's Athlete Committee stated, "Although we have known of the allegations, to read the report today, to see the weight of the evidence, and to see the scale of doping and deception is astounding." The athlete committee, the Institute of National Anti-Doping Organizations, and the leaders of anti-doping agencies in Austria, Canada, Denmark, Egypt, Finland, Germany, Japan, the Netherlands, New Zealand, Norway, Spain, Sweden, Switzerland, and the United States called for Russia to be banned from the 2016 Olympics in Rio. After Bach delayed a decision on whether to ban the entire Russian team, IOC member Dick Pound said, "the IOC is for some reason very reluctant to think about a total exclusion of the Russian team. But we've got institutionalized, government-organised cheating on a wide scale across a whole range of sports in a country. You've got to keep from turning [zero tolerance] into: 'We have zero tolerance except for Russia.'" Bruce Arthur of the Toronto Star said, "If the threshold Russia established is not high enough to merit a total ban from an Olympic Games, it's a remarkable precedent to set." Former IOC vice president, Kevan Gosper of Australia, said, "we have to be very careful [about making] the wrong move with an important country like Russia", to which Richard Hind of The Daily Telegraph (Sydney) responded, "And there is the IOC in a nutshell. There are nations, and there are 'important nations'. Not everyone pees in the same specimen jar."

The IOC's decision on 24 July 2016 was criticised by competitors and writers. It received support from the European Olympic Committees, which said that Russia is "a valued member". Cam Cole of Canada's National Post said that the IOC had "caved, as it always does, defaulting to whatever compromise it could safely adopt without offending a superpower". Expressing disappointment, a member of the IOC Athletes' Commission, Hayley Wickenheiser, wrote, "I ask myself if we were not dealing with Russia would this decision to ban a nation [have] been an easier one? I fear the answer is yes." Writing for Deutsche Welle in Germany, Olivia Gerstenberger said that Bach had "flunked" his first serious test, adding, "With this decision, the credibility of the organization is shattered once more, while that of state-sponsored doping actually receives a minor boost." Bild (Germany) described Bach as "Putin's poodle". Paul Hayward, chief sports writer of The Daily Telegraph (UK), remarked, "The white flag of capitulation flies over the International Olympic Committee. Russia's deep political reach should have told us this would happen."

Leaders of thirteen national anti-doping organisations wrote that the IOC had "violated the competitors' fundamental rights to participate in Games that meet the stringent requirements of the World Anti-Doping Code" and "[demonstrated that] it lacks the independence required to keep commercial and political interests from influencing the tough decisions necessary to protect clean sport". WADA's former chief investigator, Jack Robertson, said "The anti-doping code is now just suggestions to follow or not" and that "WADA handed the IOC that excuse [not enough time before the Olympics] by sitting on the allegations for close to a year." McLaren was dissatisfied with the IOC's handling of his report, saying "It was about state-sponsored doping and the misrecording of doping results and they turned the focus into individual competitors and whether they should compete. [...] it was a complete turning upside down of what was in the report and passing over responsibility to all the different international federations."

=== In Russia ===
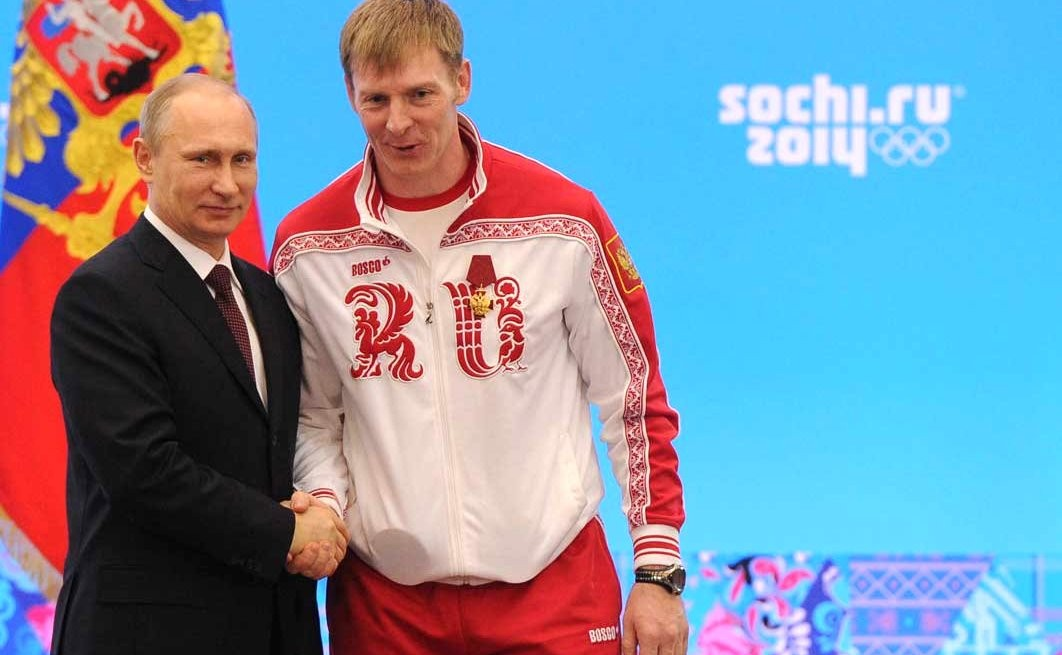
Vladimir Putin awards Alexandr Zubkov at the ceremonies for Russian athletes, 24 February 2014. Zubkov would be stripped of his gold medals 3 and a half years later.

Some Russians described the allegations as an anti-Russian plot while others stated that Russia was "just doing what the rest of the world does", also claims that it is being targeted and framed due to political events in Crimea. Russian President Vladimir Putin said that Russia had "never supported any violations in sport, we have never supported it at the state level, and we will never support this" and that the allegations were part of an "anti-Russia policy" by the West. Aleksey Pushkov, chairman of Russia's parliamentary foreign affairs committee, said that the IAAF's decision to uphold its ban was "an act of political revenge against Russia for its independent foreign policy". A member of Russia's parliament, Vadim Dengin, stated, "The entire doping scandal is a pure falsification, invented to discredit and humiliate Russia." After the Court of Arbitration for Sport turned down an appeal by Russian athletes, pole vaulter Yelena Isinbayeva wrote, "Let all those pseudo-clean foreign athletes breathe a sigh of relief and win their pseudo gold medals in our absence. They always did fear strength." The Ministry of Foreign Affairs called the ruling a "crime against sport". A poll by the Levada Center found that 14% of Russians believed that the country's competitors had doped in Sochi, 71% did not believe WADA's reports, and 15% decided not to answer.

A spokesman for Putin called Stepanova a "Judas". The Russian media have also criticised the Stepanovs. Yuliya Stepanova said, "All the news stories call me a traitor and not just traitor but a traitor to the Motherland." Vitaly Stepanov said, "I wasn't trying to expose Russia, I was trying to expose corrupt sports officials that are completely messing up competitions not just inside the country but globally." Frankfurter Allgemeine Zeitung reported that the Russian media portrayed the German documentaries as "part of a Western conspiracy with the aim of weakening the great nation that Vladimir Putin lifted from its knees". Hajo Seppelt had the "impression that he and the Stepanovs were being styled as enemies of the state".

Dick Pound described Russia's response as "a bit like when you get stopped for speeding on the freeway by the police and you say 'Why me? Everyone else was doing it'." He stated that if Russia's authorities had "responded to their issues they could easily have enough time to sort everything out in time for Rio. But instead, they played the role of victims, claiming there was a plot against them for too long." Leonid Bershidsky, a Russian writer for Bloomberg View, wrote that Russia's "officials need to understand that "whataboutism" doesn't avert investigations". The Moscow correspondent of Deutsche Welle, Juri Rescheto, wrote that the response he saw in Russia "shows that the country is living in a parallel universe" and seeks to blame others. Writing for The New York Times, Andrew E. Kramer said that Russia responded to the IAAF's decision against reinstatement with "victimhood" reflecting a "culture of grievances that revolves around perceived slights and anti-Russian conspiracies taking place in the outside world, particularly in Western countries". The newspaper's editorial board also saw a "narrative of victimization" in Russia, and wrote that it resembled how the Soviet Union would respond to a punishment – by saying that it was "politically motivated, always a provocation, never justified. [Even] though the Cold War is long over, President Vladimir Putin remains stuck in the same, snarling defensive crouch in his responses to any accusations of Russian foul play". Andrew Osborn of Reuters wrote that the Russian government had "deftly deflected the blame by passing it off as a Western Cold War-style plot to sabotage Russia's international comeback". In response to Russia's opinion that the allegations were "politically motivated", WADA's former chief investigator, Jack Robertson, said that he saw politics "when Craig Reedie tried to intervene by writing emails to the Russian ministry to console them".

Match TV said that Americans had orchestrated the doping scandal, and modern pentathlon champion Aleksander Lesun called it an unfair "attack", because "Doping is in all countries and there are violators everywhere." Following the IOC's announcement on 24 July 2016, Russian sports minister Vitaly Mutko said it was "a just and fair decision and we hope every federation will take the same kind of decision. Doping is a worldwide evil, not only of Russia." The Russian media's reaction was "nearly euphoric at points".

A reporter from Russian state-owned television told IOC President Thomas Bach that "It looked like you personally were helping us," and asked whether the doping investigation was a "political attack" on Russian competitors. After Russian competitors said that McLaren was about "politics" rather than sport, the British biathlon association stated that their comments were "brain-washed, deluded and dishonest" and decided to boycott an event in Russia. Russia's Deputy Prime Minister Vitaly Mutko said that competitors should be "punished" for calls to boycott.

On 7 December 2017, it was reported that Russian oligarch Mikhail Prokhorov paid a Russian Olympic athlete millions of rubles in hush money not to reveal Russia's elaborate doping scheme. Prokhorov had run the Russian Biathlon Union from 2008 to 2014 and offered legal services to disqualified Russian biathletes.

In Russia, the December 2019 sanction was received with outrage. President Vladimir Putin slammed the decision as a "politically motivated" ruling that "contradicted" the Olympic Charter. "There is nothing to reproach the Russian Olympic Committee for and if there is no reproach towards this committee, the country should take part in competitions under its own flag," Putin said. Russian Prime Minister Dmitry Medvedev also said the ban was politically motivated. "This is the continuation of this anti-Russian hysteria that has already become chronic," Medvedev told domestic press.

==== 2017 Sochi bans ====
The fallout from the IOC bans of Russian competitors caught doping at the Sochi Olympics, which left previous Russian whistleblowers in fear of their own personal safety, has been likened to a "witch-hunt" within the Russian winter sports community. On 9 November 2017, Vladimir Putin called the decisions to ban Russian competitors for doping violations an attempt by the U.S. to undermine his nation and affect the Russian presidential election in March.

According to Russian news agency TASS, the Russian sports minister Pavel Kolobkov said that the investigative committee had found no evidence that the state was operating a doping system; that same committee was seeking whistleblower Grigory Rodchenkov's extradition from the United States, where he is in witness protection. Despite reassurances from Russian officials that no doping system existed, IOC official Dick Pound said: "empirical evidence is totally to the contrary, so I think what we're seeing in the Russian press is for domestic consumption."

On 17 November 2017, top Russian Olympic official Leonid Tyagachev said that Grigory Rodchenkov, who had alleged that Russia was running a systematic doping programme, "should be shot for lying, like Stalin would have done".

=== 2018 Olympic ban ===
The IOC's decision was criticized by Jack Robertson, primary investigator of the Russian doping programme on behalf of WADA, who said that the IOC had issued "a non-punitive punishment meant to save face while protecting the [IOC’s] and Russia’s commercial and political interests". He also emphasized that Russian whistleblowers provided empirical evidence that "99 per cent of [their] national-level teammates were doping." According to Robertson, "[WADA] has discovered that when a Russian competitor [reaches] the national level, he or she [has] no choice in the matter: [it is] either dope, or you’re done"; he added "There is currently no intelligence I have seen or heard about that indicates the state-sponsored doping program has ceased." It was also reported that Russian officials intensively lobbied U.S. politicians in an apparent attempt to achieve the extradition to Russia of the main whistleblower, Grigory Rodchenkov.

On 6 December 2017, Putin announced his decision "not to prevent individual Russian competitors" from participating at the 2018 Winter Games. He also stated that he is pleased that the IOC Inquiry Commission chaired by Samuel Schmid "didn't find any proof that the Russian government was involved in a doping conspiracy". However, the Inquiry Commission only said that there's not enough evidence to claim that highest Russian state authorities were involved. The fact that Russian Ministry of Sport and Federal Security Service were part of the scheme was never in doubt.

Deputy (member) of the Russian State Duma and former professional boxer Nikolai Valuev has said that Russia should go to the Olympics and "tear everyone apart to spite these bastards who want to kill our sport".

Despite the "Olympic Athletes from Russia" (OAR) designation, many Russian fans still attended the 2018 Games, wearing the Russian colours and chanting "Russia!" in unison, in an act of defiance against the ban.

Justin Peters of Slate magazine wrote during the Games that the IOC "ended up with a situation that seemed to negate the entire point of the sanctions against Russia. The IOC did not want there to be a Russian Olympic team at the Pyeongchang Games… [yet] arenas are full of teams of Russian Olympians… [this is] a half-hearted wrist slap issued by an entity that appears more interested in saving face than in protecting competitors".

The CAS decision to overturn the life bans of 28 Russian competitors and restore their medals met fierce criticism among Olympic officials, including IOC president Thomas Bach who described the decision as "extremely disappointing and surprising". Grigory Rodchenkov's lawyer has stated that "the CAS decision would allow doped competitors to escape without punishment" and also that "[the CAS decision] provides yet another ill-gotten gain for the corrupt Russian doping system generally, and Putin specifically".

== Statistics ==
WADA publishes annual summaries of anti-doping rule violations (ADRV). Russia ranked first in the world for ADRVs during 2013, 2014, 2015, and 2018–2022.

Anti-doping rule violations
Year	Russian ADRV	Total world ADRV	Russian proportion	Russian rank	As of
2013	225	1,953	11.5%	1	15 May 2015
2014	148	1,647	9%	1	21 February 2016
2015	176	1,901	9.3%	1	31 January 2017
2016	69	1,326	5.2%	6	31 December 2017
2017	82	1,459	5.6%	5	31 May 2019
2018	144	1,640	8.7%	1	2 March 2020
2019	167	1,537	10,9%	1	31 January 2021
2020	135	672	20,1%	1	31 December 2020
2021	183	1,094	16,7%	1	31 December 2021
2022	164	1,979	8,3%	1	31 December 2022

=== Stripped Olympic medals ===
Due to doping violations, Russia had been stripped of 43 Olympic medals in 2019 – the most of any country, nearly four times the number of the runner-up, and almost a third of the global total. It was the leading country in terms of the number of medals removed due to doping at the 2002 Winter Olympics (5 medals), the 2006 Winter Olympics (1 medal), the 2008 Summer Olympics (14 medals), the 2010 Winter Olympics (1 medal), the 2012 Summer Olympics (15 medals), 2014 Winter Olympics (4 medals) and the joint most at the 2004 Summer Olympics (3 medals) and the 2016 Summer Olympics (1 medal). The 43 revoked medals include 12 Golds, 20 Silvers, and 11 Bronzes. This does not include other medals stripped from Russian associated Olympic teams. By 2021, the total number of stripped medals increased to 51.

Olympics	Competitor	Medal	Event	Ref
2002 Winter Olympics	Olga Danilova	Gold	Cross-country skiing, women's 5 km + 5 km combined pursuit	
2002 Winter Olympics	Olga Danilova	Silver	Cross-country skiing, women's 10 km classical	
2002 Winter Olympics	Larisa Lazutina	Gold	Cross-country skiing, women's 30 km classical	
2002 Winter Olympics	Larisa Lazutina	Silver	Cross-country skiing, women's 15 km freestyle	
2002 Winter Olympics	Larisa Lazutina	Silver	Cross-country skiing, women's 5 km + 5 km combined pursuit	
2004 Summer Olympics	Irina Korzhanenko	Gold	Athletics, women's shot put	
2004 Summer Olympics	Svetlana Krivelyova	Bronze	Athletics, women's shot put	
2004 Summer Olympics	Oleg Perepetchenov	Bronze	Weightlifting, men's 77 kg	
2006 Winter Olympics	Olga Medvedtseva	Silver	Biathlon, women's individual	
2008 Summer Olympics	Relay team (Yuliya Chermoshanskaya)	Gold	Athletics, women's 4 × 100 m relay	
2008 Summer Olympics	Relay team (Anastasiya Kapachinskaya, Tatyana Firova)	Silver	Athletics, women's 4 × 400 m relay	
2008 Summer Olympics	Maria Abakumova	Silver	Athletics, women's javelin throw	
2008 Summer Olympics	Tatyana Lebedeva	Silver	Athletics, women's triple jump	
2008 Summer Olympics	Tatyana Lebedeva	Silver	Athletics, women's long jump	
2008 Summer Olympics	Khasan Baroyev	Silver	Wrestling, men's Greco-Roman 120 kg	
2008 Summer Olympics	Marina Shainova	Silver	Weightlifting, women's 58 kg	
2008 Summer Olympics	Relay team (Denis Alexeev)	Bronze	Athletics, men's 4 × 400 m relay	
2008 Summer Olympics	Yekaterina Volkova	Bronze	Athletics, women's 3000 m steeplechase	
2008 Summer Olympics	Anna Chicherova	Bronze	Athletics, women's high jump	
2008 Summer Olympics	Khadzhimurat Akkayev	Bronze	Weightlifting, men's 94 kg	
2008 Summer Olympics	Dmitry Lapikov	Bronze	Weightlifting, men's 105 kg	
2008 Summer Olympics	Nadezhda Evstyukhina	Bronze	Weightlifting, women's 75 kg	
2008 Summer Olympics	Tatyana Chernova	Bronze	Athletics, women's heptathlon	
2010 Winter Olympics	Relay team (Evgeny Ustyugov)	Bronze	Biathlon, men's relay	
2012 Summer Olympics	Tatyana Lysenko	Gold	Athletics, women's hammer throw	
2012 Summer Olympics	Yuliya Zaripova	Gold	Athletics, women's 3000 m steeplechase	
2012 Summer Olympics	Sergey Kirdyapkin	Gold	Athletics, men's 50 km walk	
2012 Summer Olympics	Mariya Savinova	Gold	Athletics, women's 800 m	
2012 Summer Olympics	Ivan Ukhov	Gold	Athletics, men's high jump	
2012 Summer Olympics	Darya Pishchalnikova	Silver	Athletics, women's discus throw	
2012 Summer Olympics	Yevgeniya Kolodko	Silver	Athletics, women's shot put	
2012 Summer Olympics	Olga Kaniskina	Silver	Athletics, women's 20 km walk	
2012 Summer Olympics	Apti Aukhadov	Silver	Weightlifting, men's 85 kg	
2012 Summer Olympics	Aleksandr Ivanov	Silver	Weightlifting, men's 94 kg	
2012 Summer Olympics	Natalia Zabolotnaya	Silver	Weightlifting, women's 75 kg	
2012 Summer Olympics	Svetlana Tsarukayeva	Silver	Weightlifting, women's 63 kg	
2012 Summer Olympics	Relay team (Antonina Krivoshapka, Yulia Gushchina, Tatyana Firova)	Silver	Athletics, women's 4 × 400 m relay	
2012 Summer Olympics	Tatyana Chernova	Bronze	Athletics, women's heptathlon	
2012 Summer Olympics	Svetlana Shkolina	Bronze	Athletics, women's high jump	
2014 Winter Olympics	Two-man (Alexandr Zubkov, Alexey Voyevoda)	Gold	Bobsleigh, two-man	
2014 Winter Olympics	Four-man (Alexandr Zubkov, Alexey Voyevoda)	Gold	Bobsleigh, four-man	
2014 Winter Olympics	Relay team (Evgeny Ustyugov)	Gold	Biathlon, men's relay	
2014 Winter Olympics	Relay team (Olga Zaitseva)	Silver	Biathlon, women's relay	
2016 Summer Olympics	Mikhail Aloyan	Silver	Boxing, men's flyweight	

== Hashtag controversy ==
According to Reuters, Russian trolls were involved in spreading the Twitter hashtag #NoRussiaNoGames following the announcement from IOC that Russia was suspended from the 2018 Winter Olympics. One of the accounts identified by Reuters as driving activity around #NoRussiaNoGames was @ungestum, which lists its location as the Russian city of Orenburg. The account had sent 238 tweets consisting of just the hashtag to other users since the ban was announced, indicating that these were computer-generated. The campaign was also highly promoted by a group of at least five accounts which tweeted the hashtag numerous times along with the links that were not related to Russian-language news articles, and repeatedly reposted tweets from each other. One of those accounts, @03_ppm, has sent at least 275 such tweets.

== See also ==
- Category:Sportspeople in doping cases by nationality
- Doping in sport
- Doping at the Olympics
- List of stripped Olympic medals
- Houston Astros sign stealing scandal
