= Hajo Seppelt =

German journalist and author (born 1963)

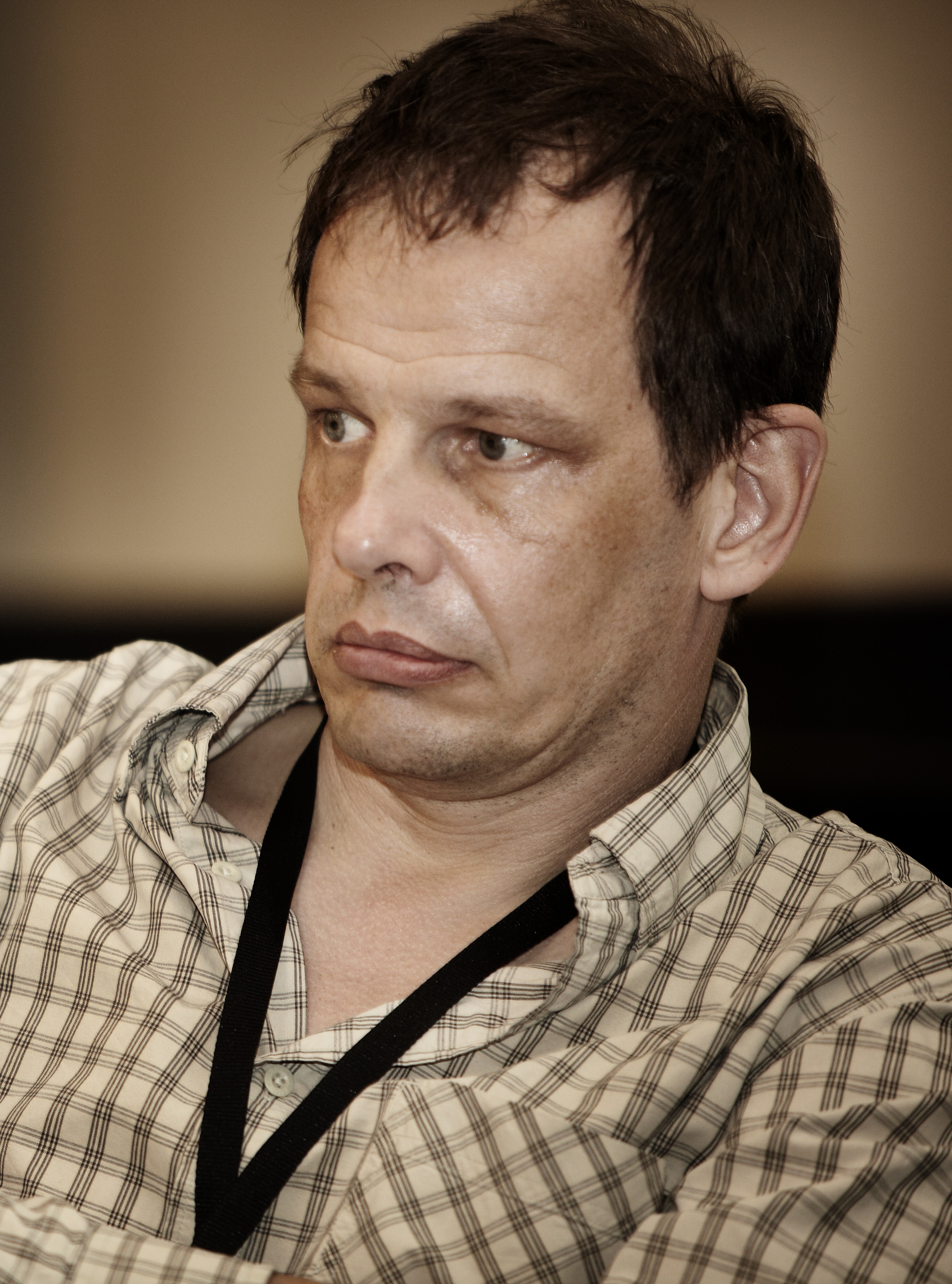
- Born: 1963 (age 62–63); West Berlin, West Germany
- Occupations: German journalist and author

Hans-Joachim "Hajo" Seppelt (born 1963) is a German journalist and author.

He is considered an expert on doping issues in German and international sport. The documentaries produced by him and his team have played a key role in exposing doping offences and attempts to cover them up.

Internationally he is particularly well-known for his role in exposing the comprehensive Russian state-sponsored system of doping in international sports.

== Personal life and education ==
Seppelt was born in West Berlin, and is the son of Alfred Seppelt, who was the head of the Berlin Chess Federation from 1984 to 2004.

In 1981, he obtained his college preparatory degree (Abitur) at the Beethoven High School in Berlin's Lankwitz neighborhood. He studied sports, social studies, journalism and French at the Free University of Berlin for a few semesters but did not complete a degree.

== Career ==
Since 1985, Seppelt has worked as a sports reporter for Germany's premier public broadcaster ARD. He has also worked for the Berlin public broadcaster Sender Freies Berlin and its 2003 successor Rundfunk Berlin-Brandenburg. After working for many years as a live commentary for swimming events for ARD, he was stripped of this duty in the early summer of 2006. Seppelt said that this was in reaction to a private email, in which he criticized ARD's uncritical reporting on doping, becoming public. Since 2006, he has worked as a freelance journalist for ARD and has made a number of reports and documentary films about doping.

=== Doping in Germany ===
Together with former Canadian swimmer Karin Helmstaedt, Seppelt made the documentary film Staatsgeheimnis Kinderdoping (State Secret Child Doping) about the perpetrators and victims of doping in East German swimming. It was broadcast by ARD. Together with Holger Schück, he published the book Anklage: Kinderdoping. Das Erbe des DDR-Sports (Indictment child-doping: The Legacy of East German Sports) in 1999. It also dealt with the topic of state doping in Communist East Germany.

In 2006, Seppelt reported extensively about the doping problem in cycling. Among other things, his research led to the identification of the German physician Markus China as a member of the doping network organized by Spanish doctor Eufemiano Fuentes. In November of that year, he was awarded the Leuchtturm für besondere publizistische Leistungen (Lighthouse Prize for Special Journalist Achievement) by the journalists' association Netzwerk Recherche for his research, reports and exclusive revelations about cyclists Jan Ullrich and Floyd Landis and Eufemiano Fuentes.

In the documentary "Mission: Clean Sport" Hajo Seppelt and Jo Goll documented the work of German doping control officers. The film highlighted flaws in Germany's doping-control system and caused heady public discussions, which contributed to structural changes in Germany's National Anti Doping Agency (NADA). The report won the Silver Chest Award 2007 at the International Television Film Festival in Plovdiv and the international Sports Movie and TV Award 2007 in Milan. The film was also nominated for the German Television Prize and the Prix Europa.

In mid-January the German Skiing Association (DSV) took legal action, and a Hamburg court issued an injunction against Seppelt for refusing to make a cease-and-desist declaration demanded by the DSV about suspicions that German cross-country skiers and biathletes had engaged in blood doping in a Vienna laboratory. A superior court in Hamburg overturned that ruling in Seppelt's favor, concluding that DSV had no right to demand the cease-and-desist declaration because it was not affected by the journalist's reporting. The ruling was based constitutional guarantees of journalist freedom in cases of anonymous sources. The judgement also overturned an injunction from 21 October 2008. Seppelt's suspicion could not be proved after extensive investigations.

In January 2012 Seppelt and colleagues from the Western German public broadcaster WDR had reports featured on ARD and WDR sports programs about the blood of thirty athletes being exposed to ultra-violet radiation by a sports doctor in the Eastern German city of Erfurt. Several of the athletes concerned were named. In the wake of the broadcasts, a discussion arose as to whether such procedures were banned according to the World Anti-Doping Agency (WADA) code. WADA itself considered them to be. Anti-doping investigations of the athletes ended up with discontinuations and acquittals due to extenuating circumstances, and a criminal investigation of the doctor concerned was also discontinued. Nonetheless, many experts declared that blood treatments were banned in principle by the laws governing sports. The doctor tried to get a superior court in Cologne to issue an injunction against WDR, but the broadcaster won out, and the report was allowed to contain references to "forbidden blood treatments."

=== Doping in China ===
Parallel with the 2008 Summer Olympics in Beijing, ARD broadcast the 45-minute-documentary Olympia im Reich der Mittel: Doping in China (Flying High in the Middle Kingdom: Doping in China), which Seppelt made with Jo Goll. The film reported about doping and doping controls in China, in particularly above proven case of stem-cell manipulation carried out on top athletes. At the International New York Film Festival, it won a world gold medal for long-form reporting. It was also awarded the main prize at 2009 Sportfilm Liberec 2007 – World Facts Challenge festival.

=== Doping in Kenya ===
In the spring and summer of 2012, Seppelt and Kempe reported for the first time about doping among Kenyan track-and-field athletes. The focus was primarily on practices among doctors in the background. One athlete told of widespread doping among Kenyan long-distance runners. The reports caused intense reactions in Kenya and met with considerable international resonance. As a result, doping controls were stepped up in the country.

The documentary Doping – Top Secret: The Shadowy World of Athletics shows that it is relatively easy to obtain banned performance-enhancing drugs in Kenya. It traces the story of an impoverished young runner who seems to have died from the side effects of taking EPO.

Kenyan athletics authorities refused to speak with Seppelt about the issue, and his film presents circumstantial evidence of corruption among Kenyan sports functionaries. Former Boston marathon winner Rito Jeptoo asserts that Kenyan athletes are not subjected to blood tests while training. Another Kenyan runner claims that the national federation suppresses positive doping results in return for bribes.

Seppelt also suggests the International Association of Athletics Federations isn't doing enough to address the problem of doping in endurance disciplines. After evaluating data on athletes' blood collected at major athletics competitions over a number of years, two Australian scientists conclude that doping is the only plausible explanation for some of the measurements. The IAAF also refused to speak with Seppelt about his suspicions.

In August 2015, he presented a nearly hour-long report questioning athletics in general and Kenya's long-distance runners in particular.

Shortly before the IAAF World Championships in London, German broadcaster ARD aired a new episode of Doping Top Secret in August 2017, titled "The Big Money Run. Africa's Athletes on Sale." The feature by Hajo Seppelt, Benjamin Best, Ulrike Unfug, and Grit Hartmann particularly examines people surrounding and influencing African Athletes in track and field disciplines. It focuses not only on doping, but also delves into shady practices of managers and into the numerous changes of nationality that occur in this core Olympic sport.

=== Doping in Russia ===
In December 2014 ARD broadcast Seppelt's film Geheimsache Doping: Wie Russland seine Sieger macht (The Doping Secret: How Russia Makes its Winners), made with the help of Russian athletes who told their stories in front of the camera. In this 60-minute documentary, whistleblowers testified to systematic doping in athletics and other sports in Russia. The film presents evidence for these allegations in form of footage and audio recordings secretly made by the whistleblowers as well as official documents. The documentary attracted global media attention and was broadcast worldwide in a number of languages. After its broadcast in Germany, several figures in international sports organizations and anti-doping institutions either resigned their posts or were suspended.

In March 2016, in its Sport Inside program, the WDR broadcast another film on doping in athletics with a focus on Russia: "Geheimsache Doping: Russlands Täuschungsmanöver" ("The Doping Secret: Russia's Red Herrings"). In it, Hajo Seppelt, together with co-author Florian Riesewieck, showed how Russian coaches and officials avoided conditions of the World Athletics Federation IAAF and the World Anti-Doping Agency WADA. The 30-minute documentary once again received extensive international attention and was broadcast in several countries. In November 2016 the documentary "Doping – Top secret: The protection racket" (by Hajo Seppelt, Florian Riesewieck, Olga Sviridenko and Felix Becker) was aired in ARD's weekly programme "Sportschau". It is based on a joint investigation by the French newspaper Le Monde and the ARD doping editorial team. The documentary is about criminal activities linked to doping and cover up in international athletics.

In May 2018 ARD announced that Russia had declared void a visa issued to Seppelt so he could report on the 2018 FIFA World Cup, citing Russia stating that Seppelt is on a list of unwanted persons. In May 2018 Seppelt and Florian Riesewieck produced another episode of the documentary series "Doping Top Secret" on ARD – titled "Russia's Football Friends". This time they focused on suspicious facts in football in Russia, host country of the World Cup.

=== Doping in Weightlifting ===
On 5 January 2020, Seppelt released a documentary on ARD titled 'Secret Doping – the Lord of the Lifters'. In the documentary, Seppelt uncovers that weightlifters as young as 13 in Thailand are encouraged to take performance-enhancing drugs. In a secret recording, Seppelt also captures footage of Olympic bronze medalist Siripuch Gulnoi admitting to taking performance-enhancing drugs before winning bronze at the 2012 Olympics. Other secret footage also captures a doctor with the Moldovan weightlifting team claiming that they used doppelgangers to give urine samples for athletes in exchange for payments. The documentary also made claims of corruption against the IWF and its president, Tamás Aján, resulting in him stepping aside from the role pending an investigation and resigning as an IOC honorary member. He eventually resigned from his position as president permanently on 15 April. The president and entire executive board of the Thai Amateur Weightlifting Association (TAWA) also resigned from their positions. The new acting president of the IWF appointed Richard McLaren, the Canadian lawyer whose investigative work did so much to expose state-sponsored doping in Russia, to lead the investigation into corruption and doping in weightlifting.

=== Other reports ===
Prior to the 2008 Summer Olympics in Beijing, ARD broadcast the 45-minute-documentary "Flying High in the Middle Kingdom: Doping in China", which Hajo Seppelt produced with Jo Goll. The film reported about doping and doping controls in China, in particular, about proven cases of stem-cell manipulation carried out on top athletes. At the International New York Film Festival, it won a world gold medal for long-form reporting. It was also awarded the main prize at the 2009 Sportfilm Liberec 2007 – World Facts Challenge Festival.

Prior to the 2009 World Athletics Championships in Berlin, ARD broadcast the documentary "Doping Top Secret: The String-Pullers in Athletics" by Hajo Seppelt and Robert Kempe about the people who pull the strings in doping in track-and-field.

Prior to the 2010 Winter Olympics in Vancouver, ARD broadcast the 30-minute feature "Geheimsache Doping Eiskalter Betrug" ("Doping Top Secret: "Ice-Cold Cheating"). In it, Hajo Seppelt, Robert Kempe and Jochen Leufgens took a look behind the scenes at winter sports.

In the wake of research by Seppelt in September 2010 about the world's top cyclist Alberto Contador, the Union Cycliste Internationale had to admit that the Spanish Tour de France winner had turned up positive in doping tests. It emerged that the UCI had wanted to keep secrets a positive test by Contador for the substance Clenbuterol at the Tour de France in July 2010. In February 2012, Contador was retroactively banned for two years, from August 2010 to August 2012, by the International Court of Arbitration for Sport (CAS) for Clenbuterol use.

In May 2011, Seppelt and co-filmmaker Kempe had the chance to film footage about sports for a week in Pyongyang, the capital of North Korea. The result was the documentary film Sport in Nordkorea – Einblicke in eine unbekannte Welt (Sports in North Korea – A Look at an Unknown World), which was broadcast by ARD in July 2011.

In 2013, Seppelt and Kempe completed a critical documentary about Thomas Bach, shortly before he was elected president of the International Olympic Committee. In January 2017 Germany's ARD television aired another part of its "Doping Top Secret" series. The new episode focussed on Russian whistleblower Andrey Dmitriev. Frustrated with the persistence of doping in his home country's athletics community, the runner made secret video recordings. The footage enabled him to prove that a big-name coach suspended due to doping links is still working with athletes.

In April 2017, Hajo Seppelt and his colleague Thilo Neumann revealed the existence of positive doping tests for Clenbuterol in the context of follow-up checks during the 2008 Olympic Games in Peking. The journalists also uncovered that the IOC kept these results a secret in consultation with WADA. Research showed that the IOC did not follow up on these cases, even though the organization's regulations demand further investigation in case of positive doping tests. Among the athletes who were tested positive, there was at least one Jamaican sprinter. The IOC's declaration, stating that the positive tests were a result of the athletes' consumption of meat from China which supposedly contained Clenbuterol and that therefore there where no investigations concerning other possible causes, engendered worldwide criticism.

In June 2017 the German Broadcaster a new Episode of "Doping Top Secret", titled "Brazil's dirty game", was aired by ARD. The documentary by Hajo Seppelt, Florian Riesewieck und Thilo Neumann examined the topic of doping in the host country of the last Football World Championships and of the last Olympic Games. Massive failings and shortcomings of Brazil's doping prevention plans where substantiated. Additionally, a multitude of indications for a culture of doping, deeply rooted in Brazil Football and stretching up to the national elite could be found.

In June 2018 on occasion of the Football World Cup in Russia ARD German TV aired a documentary titled "Doping Top secret: Brazil's Twelfth man" (Authors: Hajo Seppelt, Florian Riesewieck, Edmund Willison) about doping in Brazilian football.

== Awards ==
- 1989 Great Radio Award of the Association of German Sports Journalists for a radio feature about the New York Marathon
- 1992 Great Television Award of the Association of German Sports Journalists for a documentary about Berlin's bid for the 2000 Olympics (Co-Author: Johannes B. Kerner)
- 1998 Great Television Award of the Association of German Sports Journalists for the documentary "State Secret Children's Doping" about Doping in East Germany (Co-Author: Karin Helmstaedt)
- 2001 Great Television Award of the Association of German Sports Journalists for a film about the East German doping victim Andreas Krieger
- 2003 Great Television Award of the Association of German Sports Journalists for the educational documentary "Doping: A dangerous game"
- 2006 "Leuchtturm" of the network Netzwerk Recherche, for special journalistic achievements
- 2007 Main Prize at the international festival Sportfilm Liberec – World FICTS Challenge for the ARD exclusive "Mission Sauberer Sport" (with Jo Goll)
- 2007 Silver Chest Award at the International Documentary Film Festival in Plovdiv for "Mission Sauberer Sport" (with Jo Goll)
- 2007 International Sports Movies TV Award for the documentary "Mission Sauberer Sport" ("Mission Clean Sports") in the category "Documentary" at the international film festival of Federation Internationale Cinema Television Sportifs in Milano (with Jo Goll)
- 2007 German Sports Journalist of the Year
- 2007 Nomination German Television Prize in the category Best Sports Program for "Mission Sauberer Sport" ("Mission Clean Sports") with Jo Goll
- 2008 Nomination of the WDR program sport inside for the 44th Adolf Grimme Prize (member of the team of authors)
- 2009 Gold World Medal at the New York Festival TV & Video Award, in the category Best Investigative Report (Long Form) for the documentary "Olympia im Reich der Mitte: Doping in China" (with Jo Goll)
- 2009 Nomination for the 45th Adolf Grimme Prize in the category Special Prize for his "persistent and courageous researching on the topic of doping and excellent achievements in reporting"
- 2009 Main Prize, International Festival Sportfilm Liberec – World Facts Challenge for the ARD "Olympia im Reich der Mitte: Doping in China" (with Jo Goll)
- 2009 Nomination of the WDR program sport inside in the category Best Sports Program for the German Television Prize 2009 (together with Tom Theunissen, Marc Schlömer, Klaus Fiedler, Fred Kowasch, Ulrich Loke, Reiner Lefeber and Jochen Leufgens)
- 2011 Nomination of the WDR program sport inside in the category Best Sports Program for the German Television Prize 2011 (together with Tom Theunissen, Marc Schlömer, Jochen Leufgens, Fred Kowasch, Ulrich Loke and Reiner Lefeber)
- 2013 German Television Prize in the category Best Sports Program for the WDR program sport inside (together with Tom Theunissen, Florian Bauer, Matthias Wolf, Marc Schlömer, Ulrich Loke and Reiner Lefeber)
- 2015 Silver World Medal at New York Festivals in the category Best Investigative Report for the documentary film "Geheimsache Doping: Wie Russland seine Sieger macht" ("Doping – Top Secret: How Russia makes its winners")
- 2015 Nomination of "Doping – Top Secret: How Russia makes its winners" for the International TV-Award of the Asian-Pacific Broadcasting Union in the category "Documentary"
- 2015 International Sports Movies TV Award in the category "Sports Values" for the documentary film "Doping – Top Secret: The Shadowy World of Athletics" at the international film festival Federation Internationale Cinema Television Sportifs in Milano
- 2015 Media Award of the German Athletics Federation for Hajo Seppelt and the ARD doping research department for the coverage of doping in Russia
- 2015 German Sports Journalist of the Year
- 2015 Award of the Berlin-Brandenburg Journalists Association: "Langer Atem" – for dedication and perseverance in journalistic research. Winner of the second prize for longstanding coverage about doping in sports, particularly for the recent reporting about doping in Russia
- 2015 Awards at the first global competition for sports journalism, the "Sports Media Pearl Award" (by AIPS) in Abu Dhabi: first prize in the category Video documentary for "Doping – Top Secret: The Shadowy World of Athletics" and special prize in the category "Best investigative reporting"
- 2016 German Television Prize in the category Best Sports Program for "Doping – Top Secret: How Russia makes its winners" and "Doping – Top Secret: The Shadowy World of Athletics"
- 2016 Bud-Greenspan-Award der New York Track and Field Writers for the documentaries "Doping – Top Secret: How Russia makes its winners" and "Doping – Top Secret: The Shadowy World of Athletics"
- 2016 Finalist at the New York Film Festivals in the category "Best Investigative Report" for "Doping – Top Secret: The Shadowy World of Athletics"
- 2016 Nomination for the Austrian Film and Television Award Goldene ROMY for "Doping – Top Secret: The Shadowy World of Athletics" in the category "Best TV Documentary"
- 2016 Nomination of "Doping – Top Secret: Showdown for Russia" for PRIX EUROPA 2016 (category TV Current Affairs)
- 2016 Laureate of the Hanns Joachim Friedrichs Award for TV journalism
- 2016 Nomination Tagesthemen Award (sports category) for the story "ARD requests unwelcome: IAAF President Coe's poor start"
- 2016 International Sports Movies TV Award in the category "Sport & Society" for the documentary film "Doping – Top Secret: Russia's Red Herrings" at the international film festival of Federation Internationale Cinema Television Sportifs in Milano
- 2016 Winner of the Open Russia Award für independent news journalism and investigative research on Russian topics
- 2017 Nomination of the WDR program sport inside for the 53rd Adolf Grimme Prize (member of the team of authors)
- 2017 Gold World Medal at the New York Film Festivals in the category "Current affairs" for "Doping Top secret: Showdown for Russia" (in cooperation with Florian Riesewieck, Felix Becker and Olga Sviridenko)
- 2017 Tagesthemen Award for the reporting on doping in Russia
- 2017 Main Prize at International Festival Sportfilm Liberec – International FICTS Festival for the Documentaries "Showdown for Russia" and "Russia's Red Herrings" (Co-Authors: Florian Riesewieck, Olga Sviridenko and Felix Becker)
- 2017 Mention D'Honneur in the category "Sport & Society" for the documentary film "Doping – Top Secret: The Big Money Run – Africa's Athletes On Sale" at the international film festival of Federation Internationale Cinema Television Sportifs in Milano
- 2017 Play the Game Award (together with the whistleblowers Vitalyi Stepanov and Yuliya Stepanova)
- 2018 Gold World Medal at the New York Film Festivals in the category "Current affairs" for "Doping Top secret: The Big Money Run – Africa's Athletes on Sale" (Co-Authors: Ulrike Unfug, Benjamin Best and Grit Hartmann)
- 2018 Cross of the Order of Merit of the Federal Republic of Germany
- 2018 German Sports Journalist of the Year

== Publications ==
=== Books ===
- With Holger Schück: Anklage: Kinderdoping. (Indictment: Child Doping) Tenea Verlag, ISBN 978-3-932274-16-9

=== Selected television reports and documentary films ===
- With Karin Helmstaedt: Staatsgeheimnis Kinderdoping (State Secret Child Doping), 1997
- Gedopt: Wie eine Frau zum Mann wurde.2001
- Doping: Ein gefährliches Spiel. 2002
- Vom Einheitssport zur Vereinigung. 2005
- mit Jo Goll: Mission: Sauberer Sport. 2007
- mit Jo Goll: Olympia im Reich der Mittel: Doping in China. 2008
- mit Robert Kempe: Geheimsache Doping: Die Drahtzieher der Leichtathletik. 2009
- mit Robert Kempe und Jochen Leufgens: Geheimsache Doping: Eiskalter Betrug. 2010
- mit Robert Kempe: Sport in Nordkorea: Einblicke in eine unbekannte Welt. 2011
- mit Robert Kempe: Kein Wunder: Kenya bangt um den Läufer-Mythos. 2012
- mit Robert Kempe: Thomas Bach: Der neue Herr der Ringe? 2013
- Geheimsache Doping – Wie Russland seine Sieger macht (The Doping Secret: How Russia Makes its Winners) 2014; broadcast on ARD
- Geheimsache Doping: Im Schattenreich der Leichtathletik. 2015; broadcast on ARD, 2015-08-01 ("Doping – Top Secret: The Shadowy World of Athletics")
