= Valentin Balakhnichev =

Russian athletics administrator and athlete (1949–2026)

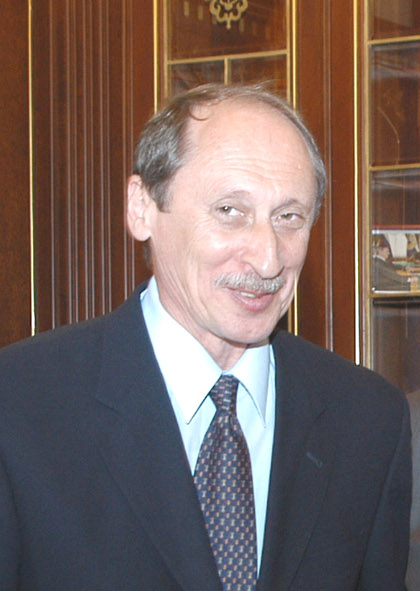
Balakhnichev in 2004

Valentin Vasilyevich Balakhnichev (Russian: Валентин Васильевич Балахничёв; 23 April 1949 – 2 February 2026) was a Russian engineer and athletics coach and a president of the All-Russia Athletic Federation. After investigations into corruption involving performance enhancing drug testing, Balakhnichev was banned for life by the IAAF.

== Life and career ==
Valentin Balakhnichev was born on 23 April 1949 in Lutsk, Soviet Union. He was an athlete for the Soviet Union, taking third place in the 110 metres hurdles at the 1973 national championships and representing his country at the 1973 European Indoor Championships. He retired as an active athlete in 1976 a year after receiving his degree from Moscow Power Engineering University and began his career as a coach. He was the Soviet national coach from 1978 to 1984. He later earned a PhD and was a doctor of sciences in theory and methodology of physical education and sports training.

Beginning in 1991 he was president of the All-Russia Athletic Federation. He was also a member of the Council for Physical Culture and Sport under the President of the Russian Federation and a member of the Executive Committee of the Russian Olympic Committee. He held the positions of Vice-Minister of Sport of the Russian Federation Positions in the International Sports Organizations, Vice-President, European Athletic Association, served on the IAAF Marketing & Promotion Commission beginning in 1997, a member of the council of the International Association of Athletics Federations from 2007 and also served as its treasurer.

He resigned his role as IAAF Treasurer amid allegations from the German broadcaster ARD that the world body was investigating a systematic doping scandal and coverup in Russia. Among the allegations was that Liliya Shobukhova, the second fastest marathoner in history paid $450,000 to avoid a doping ban. She was eventually banned, annulling her results back to 2009. Also under Balakhnichev's watch was the Saransk-based program of Viktor Chegin, who has had at least 30 of his athletes banned for doping offenses, including Olympic and world champions Elena Lashmanova and Valeriy Borchin.

On 2 February 2026, in the village of Novaya Kupavna, 48-year-old Alexander Balakhnichev, the son of Valentin Balakhnichev, while in a state of alcohol intoxication, stabbed his father after the men had quarrelled. Valentin Balakhnichev died from the wound.
