= Russian Athletics Federation =

Governing body for athletics in Russia

- Sport: Athletics
- Jurisdiction: Russia
- Abbreviation: RAF
- Founded: December 24, 1991
- Affiliation: World Athletics (suspended since 2015)
- Regional affiliation: EAA
- Headquarters: Moscow, Russia
- Location: Luzhnetskaya nab. 8, 119992 Moscow
- Chairman: Petr Fradkov
- Secretary: Alexander Djordjadze

Official website
- rusathletics.info
- (Russia)

The Russian Athletics Federation (RAF), previously named the All-Russia Athletic Federation (ARAF; Russian: Всероссийская федерация лёгкой атлетики, ВФЛА), is the governing body for the sport of athletics in Russia. Its Chairman is Petr Fradkov.

World Athletics suspended the Russian Athletics Federation from World Athletics starting in 2015, for eight years, due to doping violations. However, Russian athletes were eligible to compete as Authorised Neutral Athletes (ANA).

As of 2022, due to the 2022 Russian invasion of Ukraine, World Athletics has banned all Russian athletes, support personnel, and officials from all World Athletics Series events for the foreseeable future, including those with ANA status.

== Affiliations and associations ==
The RAF is the national member federation for Russia in World Athletics and the European Athletic Association (EAA). Due to doping allegations, its participation in both organisations has been suspended since 2015.

== National records ==
The RAF maintains the Russian records in athletics.

== Doping allegations and determinations ==
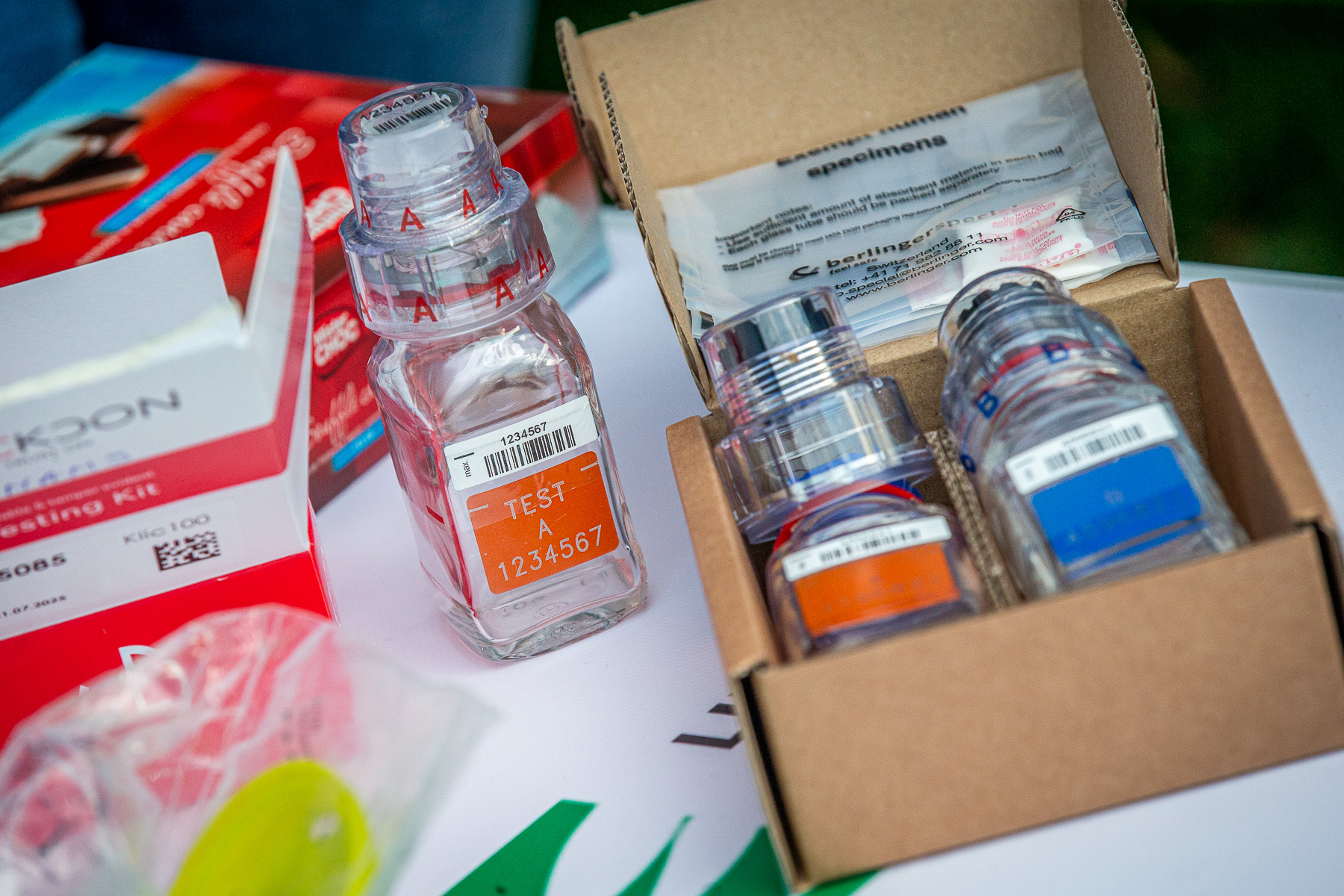
Urine doping sampling security bottles

In December 2014, the German broadcaster ARD made wide-ranging allegations of doping in Russian athletics and high-level cover-ups of this. Alleging state involvement in systematic cheating, the documentary accused Russia of an "East German-style" doping programme. These resulted in then ARAF President Valentin Balakhnichev's resignation as Treasurer of the International Association of Athletics Federations (IAAF).

In response to this, the World Anti-Doping Agency (WADA) commissioned an investigation, the report of which was published on 9 November 2015. The 323-page document, described as "damning" by The Guardian, reported widespread doping and large-scale cover ups by the authorities. It recommended that ARAF be declared non-compliant with respect to the World Anti-Doping Code, and recommended that the International Olympic Committee not accept any entries from ARAF until compliance was reached. On 13 November, the IAAF council overwhelmingly voted 22–1 in favour of prohibiting Russia from world sports events with immediate effect. Under other penalties against the ARAF, Russia has been also prohibited from hosting the 2016 World Race Walking Team Championships (Cheboksary) and 2016 World Junior Championships (Kazan), and ARAF must entrust doping cases to Court of Arbitration for Sport.

ARAF accepted the indefinite IAAF suspension and did not request a hearing. ARAF's efforts towards regaining full IAAF membership will be monitored by a five-person IAAF team.

On June 21, 2016, the International Olympic Committee affirmed the decision by the International Association of Athletics Federations, banning all of the All-Russia Athletic Federation athletes from competing in 2016 Olympics.

In 2021, the Russian Athletic Federetion paid a fine of US$2,000,000 to World Athletics for infringing the doping rules: this fine will be used to pay prize money to finalists of Oregon 2022 and Budapest 2023.

== Invasion of Ukraine ==
As of 2022, due to the 2022 Russian invasion of Ukraine, World Athletics has banned all Russian athletes, support personnel, and officials from all World Athletics Series events for the foreseeable future, including those with ANA status.

== 2016 Summer Olympics qualified athletes denied participation by IAAF ==
- Men's 400 m – Pavel Ivashko
- Men's marathon – Aleksey Reunkov
- Men's 110 m hurdles – Sergey Shubenkov
- Men's 400 m hurdles – Denis Kudryavtsev, Timofey Chalyy, Ivan Shablyuyev
- Men's 3000m steeplechase – Ilgizar Safiullin
- Men's 20 km walk – Nikolay Markov
- Men's 50 km walk – Roman Evstifeev, Sergey Sharypov
- Men's 4x400 – Artem Denmukhametov, Pavel Ivashko, Ilya Krasnov, Vladimir Krasnov, Pavel Trenikhin
- Men's long jump – Vasiliy Kopeykin, Aleksandr Menkov, Sergey Polyanskiy
- Men's triple jump – Lyukman Adams, Dmitriy Chizhikov, Aleksey Fyodorov
- Men's high jump – Danil Lysenko, Ivan Ukhov, Daniil Tsyplakov
- Men's pole vault – Georgy Gorokhov
- Men's shot put – Maksim Sidorov, Aleksandr Lesnoy
- Men's discus throw – Viktor Butenko
- Men's hammer throw – Sergey Litvinov, Aleksiy Sokirskiy
- Men's javelin throw – Dmitriy Tarabin
- Men's decathlon – Ilya Shkurenyov
- Women's 400 m – Antonina Krivoshapka
- Women's 1500m – Elena Korobkina, Anna Shchagina
- Women's 5000 m – Gulshat Fazlitdinova, Elena Korobkina
- Women's 10000 m – Alla Kulyatina
- Women's 3000 m steeplechase – Ekaterina Sokolenko, Natalya Vlasova
- Women's marathon – Tatyana Arkhipova, Alina Prokopyeva, Sardana Trofimova
- Women's 4 × 100 m – Elena Chernyaeva, Anna Kukushkina, Marina Panteleeva, Yevgeniya Polyakova, Kristina Sivkova
- Women's 4x400 – Kseniya Aksyonova, Antonina Krivoshapka, Alena Mamina, Yekaterina Renzhina
- Women's 100 m hurdles – Yekaterina Galitskaya
- Women's 400 m hurdles – Vera Rudakova
- Women's high jump – Mariya Kuchina
- Women's pole vault – Yelena Isinbayeva, Olga Mullina, Anzhelika Sidorova
- Women's long jump – Anna Misochenko, Yuliya Pidluzhnaya
- Women's triple jump – Yekaterina Koneva
- Women's shot put – Irina Tarasova
- Women's discus throw – Yelena Panova, Yekaterina Strokova, Yuliya Maltseva
- Women's hammer throw – Oksana Kondratyeva
- Women's javelin throw – Vera Rebrik
- Women's 20 km walk – Marina Pandakova, Mariya Ponomaryova, Svetlana Vasilyeva

== Renaming ==
Renamed Russian Athletics Federation.

== See also ==
- Russia at the 2016 Summer Olympics
- Doping in Russia
- McLaren Report
