= Soviet Union at the Olympics =

- Flag of the Soviet Union
- IOC code: URS
- NOC: Soviet Olympic Committee
- Medals Ranked 2nd: Gold 473 Silver 376 Bronze 355 Total 1,204

Summer appearances
- 1952; 1956; 1960; 1964; 1968; 1972; 1976; 1980; 1984; 1988

Winter appearances
- 1956; 1960; 1964; 1968; 1972; 1976; 1980; 1984; 1988

Other related appearances
- Russian Empire (1900–1912); Estonia (1920–1936, 1992–pres.); Latvia (1924–1936, 1992–pres.); Lithuania (1924–1928, 1992–pres.); Unified Team (1992); Armenia (1994–pres.); Belarus (1994–2022); Georgia (1994–pres.); Kazakhstan (1994–pres.); Kyrgyzstan (1994–pres.); Moldova (1994–pres.); Russia (1994–2016); Ukraine (1994–pres.); Uzbekistan (1994–pres.); Azerbaijan (1996–pres.); Tajikistan (1996–pres.); Turkmenistan (1996–pres.); Olympic Athletes from Russia (2018); ROC (2020–2022); Individual Neutral Athletes (2024–2026)

The Union of Soviet Socialist Republics (USSR) first participated at the Olympic Games in 1952, and competed at the Summer and Winter Games on 18 occasions subsequently. At six of its nine appearances at the Summer Olympic Games, the Soviet team ranked first in the total number of gold medals won, second three times, and became the biggest contender to the United States' domination in the Summer Games. Similarly, the team was ranked first in the gold medal count seven times and second twice in its nine appearances at the Winter Olympic Games. The Soviet Union's success might be attributed to a heavy state investment in sports to fulfill its political objectives on an international stage.

Following the Russian Revolution of November 1917 and the Russian Civil War (1917–1922), the Soviet Union did not participate in international sporting events on ideological grounds; however, after World War II (1939–1945), dominating the Olympic Games came to be seen by Soviet officials and leaders as a useful method of promoting communism. The Olympic Committee of the USSR was formed on April 21, 1951, and the IOC recognised the new body in its 45th session (May 7, 1951). In the same year, when the Soviet representative Konstantin Andrianov became an IOC member, the USSR officially joined the Olympic Movement.

The 1952 Summer Olympics in Helsinki thus became first Olympic Games for Soviet athletes. On July 20, 1952 Nina Romashkova won the first Olympic gold medal in the history of Soviet sport, competing in the women's discus throw. Romashkova's result in this event (51.42 m) was the new Olympic record at that time.

The 1956 Winter Olympics in Cortina d'Ampezzo became the first Winter Olympic Games for Soviet athletes. There Lyubov Kozyreva won the first Winter Olympic gold medal in the history of Soviet sport, competing in the women's cross-country skiing 10 km event.

The USSR became the host nation for the 1980 Summer Olympics in Moscow. The United States and many other countries boycotted these Games in protest of the Soviet invasion of Afghanistan; the USSR led a boycott of the 1984 Games in Los Angeles.

Although the USSR ceased to exist on December 26, 1991, The Olympic Committee of the USSR formally existed until March 12, 1992, when it disbanded.

In 1992, 7 of the 15 former Soviet Republics competed together as the Unified Team and marched under the Olympic Flag in the Albertville Games, where they finished second in the medal rankings. The Unified Team also competed in the Barcelona Games later in the year (represented by 12 of the 15 ex-Republics), and finished first in the medal rankings at those Games.

== Hosted Games ==
Soviet Union has hosted the Games on one occasion.

Games	Host city	Dates	Nations	Participants	Events
1980 Summer Olympics	Moscow, Russian SFSR	19 July – 3 August	80	5,179	203

=== Unsuccessful bids ===
Games	City	Winner of bid
1976 Summer Olympics	Moscow, Russian SFSR	Montreal, Canada

== Timeline of participation ==
Olympic Year/s	Teams								
1900–1904	Russian Empire								
1908–1912	Finland	Russian Empire							
1920	Finland	Estonia							
1924–1928	Finland	Estonia	Latvia	Lithuania	as part of Romania				
1932–1936	Finland	Estonia	Latvia		as part of Romania				
1952–1988	Finland	Soviet Union							
1992	Finland	Estonia	Latvia	Lithuania	Unified Team				
1994	Finland	Estonia	Latvia	Lithuania	Moldova	Russia	Belarus	Armenia; Georgia; Kazakhstan; Kyrgyzstan; Ukraine; Uzbekistan	
1996–2016	Finland	Estonia	Latvia	Lithuania	Moldova	Russia	Belarus	Armenia; Georgia; Kazakhstan; Kyrgyzstan; Ukraine; Uzbekistan	Azerbaijan; Tajikistan; Turkmenistan
2018	Finland	Estonia	Latvia	Lithuania	Moldova	Olympic Athletes from Russia	Belarus	Armenia; Georgia; Kazakhstan; Kyrgyzstan; Ukraine; Uzbekistan	Azerbaijan; Tajikistan; Turkmenistan
2020–2022	Finland	Estonia	Latvia	Lithuania	Moldova	ROC	Belarus	Armenia; Georgia; Kazakhstan; Kyrgyzstan; Ukraine; Uzbekistan	Azerbaijan; Tajikistan; Turkmenistan
2024–present	Finland	Estonia	Latvia	Lithuania	Moldova	Individual Neutral Athletes		Armenia; Georgia; Kazakhstan; Kyrgyzstan; Ukraine; Uzbekistan	Azerbaijan; Tajikistan; Turkmenistan

== Medal tables ==
=== Medals by Summer Games ===
Host country

Games	Athletes	Gold	Silver	Bronze	Total	Rank
(Finland) 1952 Helsinki	295	22	30	19	71	2
(Australia) 1956 Melbourne	283	37	29	32	98	1
(Italy) 1960 Rome	284	43	29	31	103	1
(Japan) 1964 Tokyo	319	30	31	35	96	2
1968 Mexico City	313	29	32	30	91	2
(West Germany) 1972 Munich	373	50	27	22	99	1
(Canada) 1976 Montreal	410	49	41	35	125	1
(Soviet Union) 1980 Moscow	489	80	69	46	195	1
(United States) 1984 Los Angeles	boycotted					
(South Korea) 1988 Seoul	481	55	31	46	132	1
Total (9/30)	3,247	395	319	296	1,010	2

=== Medals by Winter Games ===
Games	Athletes	Gold	Silver	Bronze	Total	Rank
(Italy) 1956 Cortina d'Ampezzo	53	7	3	6	16	1
(United States) 1960 Squaw Valley	62	7	5	9	21	1
(Austria) 1964 Innsbruck	69	11	8	6	25	1
(France) 1968 Grenoble	74	5	5	3	13	2
(Japan) 1972 Sapporo	78	8	5	3	16	1
(Austria) 1976 Innsbruck	79	13	6	8	27	1
(United States) 1980 Lake Placid	86	10	6	6	22	1
(Socialist Federal Republic of Yugoslavia) 1984 Sarajevo	99	6	10	9	25	2
(Canada) 1988 Calgary	101	11	9	9	29	1
Total (9/24)	701	78	57	59	194	5

=== Medals by summer sport ===
Leading in that sport

Sport	Gold	Silver	Bronze	Total
Gymnastics	73	67	44	184
Athletics	64	55	74	193
Wrestling	62	31	23	116
Weightlifting	39	21	2	62
Canoeing	29	13	9	51
Fencing	18	15	16	49
Shooting	17	15	17	49
Boxing	14	19	18	51
Swimming	12	21	26	59
Rowing	12	20	10	42
Cycling	11	4	9	24
Volleyball	7	4	1	12
Equestrian	6	5	4	15
Judo	5	5	13	23
Modern pentathlon	5	5	5	15
Sailing	4	5	3	12
Diving	4	4	6	14
Basketball	4	4	4	12
Handball	4	1	1	6
Water polo	2	2	3	7
Football	2	0	3	5
Archery	1	3	3	7
Field hockey	0	0	2	2
Totals (23 entries)	395	319	296	1,010

=== Medals by winter sport ===
Sport	Gold	Silver	Bronze	Total
Cross country skiing	25	22	21	68
Speed skating	24	17	19	60
Figure skating	10	9	5	24
Biathlon	9	5	5	19
Ice hockey	7	1	1	9
Luge	1	2	3	6
Bobsleigh	1	0	2	3
Ski jumping	1	0	0	1
Nordic combined	0	1	2	3
Alpine skiing	0	0	1	1
Totals (10 entries)	78	57	59	194

== Controversies ==
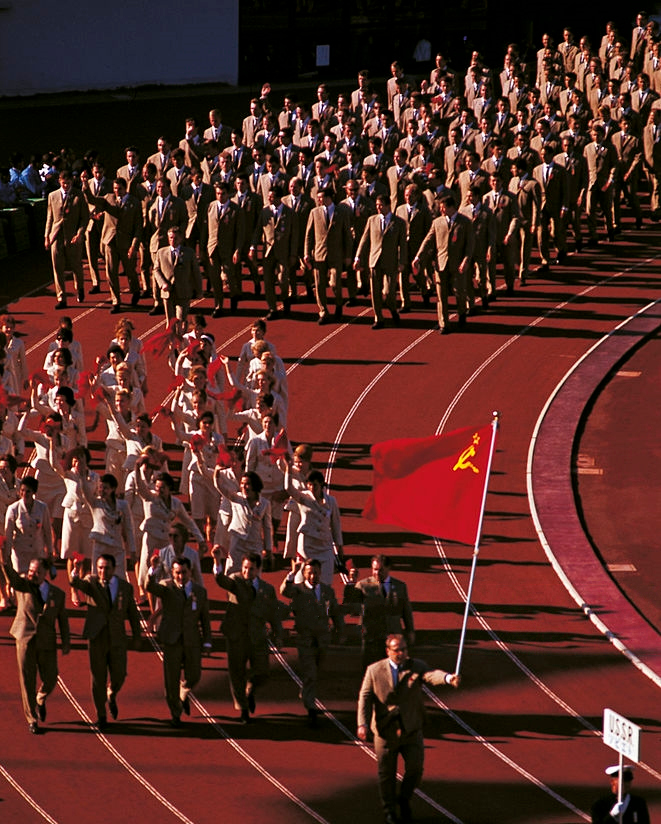
The Soviet Union team at the opening ceremony of the 1964 Summer Olympics, led by Yury Vlasov

All Soviet athletes held some nominal jobs, but were in fact state-sponsored and trained full-time. According to many experts, that gave the Soviet Union a huge advantage over the United States and other Western countries, whose athletes were students or real amateurs. Indeed, the Soviet Union monopolized the top place in the medal standings after 1968, and, until its collapse, placed second only once, in the 1984 Winter games, after another Eastern bloc nation, the GDR. Amateur rules were relaxed only in the late 1980s and were almost completely abolished in the 1990s, after the fall of the USSR.

=== Doping ===
According to British journalist Andrew Jennings, a KGB colonel stated that the agency's officers had posed as anti-doping authorities from the International Olympic Committee (IOC) to undermine doping tests and that Soviet athletes were "rescued with [these] tremendous efforts". On the topic of the 1980 Summer Olympics, a 1989 Australian study said "There is hardly a medal winner at the Moscow Games, certainly not a gold medal winner, who is not on one sort of drug or another: usually several kinds. The Moscow Games might as well have been called the Chemists' Games."

Documents obtained in 2016 revealed the Soviet Union's plans for a statewide doping system in track and field in preparation for the 1984 Summer Olympics in Los Angeles. Dated prior to the country's decision to boycott the Games, the document detailed the existing steroids operations of the program, along with suggestions for further enhancements. The communication, directed to the Soviet Union's head of track and field, was prepared by Dr. Sergei Portugalov of the Institute for Physical Culture. Portugalov was also one of the main figures involved in the implementation of the Russian doping program prior to the 2016 Summer Olympics.

=== Flag bearers controversy ===
NOC symbol of the USSR

Soviet officials expected the flag bearer to show an example of an attractive, physically strong person and a distinguished athlete. He was expected to carry the flag through the Olympic ceremony in one hand unsupported by a harness. This presented a formidable physical task as the flag weighed 16 kilograms (35 lb) in the 1960s, and a sudden wind might further increase the physical load. Hence the Soviet flag bearers at the opening ceremony of the Summer Olympics were selected from among heavyweight weightlifters or wrestlers, who did not have to compete the next day.

Soviet officials also expected the flag bearer to win a gold medal at the given Olympics. Thus, the Soviet flag bearers at the Summer Olympics of 1952 (Yakov Kutsenko) and 1956 (Aleksey Medvedev) were not allowed to compete, even though both were top-level heavyweight weightlifters – Kutsenko placed second at the 1950 World Championships and Medvedev won the world title in 1956 and 1957 – because Soviet officials did not believe they would win a gold medal.

== See also ==
- List of flag bearers for the Soviet Union at the Olympics
- Soviet Union at the Paralympics
