= Jocelin-Patrick Mandzela =

- Born: November 4, 1992 (age 33)
- Occupations: Public and political figure, entrepreneur

Jocelin-Patrick Mandzela (born 4 November 1992) is a Congolese public and political figure, entrepreneur, President of the international autonomous non-profit organization African Centre (Africa Centrum), Honorary Consul of the Republic of Congo in St. Petersburg and the Leningrad Region (Russia), Honorary President of the Gymnastics Federation of the Republic of the Congo, Honorary President of the Judo Federation of the Republic of the Congo, and Honorary President of the Congolese Chess Association.

== Early life ==
Jocelin-Patrick Mandzela was born November 4, 1992, in St. Petersburg, Russia. In 2016, he graduated from the Technological Institute in Brazzaville, Congo, with a degree in commercial banking, accounting, and financial management. He speaks Russian, English, and French.

== Entrepreneurship ==
In 2014, Jocelin-Patrick Mandzela co-founded DAMALA SARL in Brazzaville. Until 2018, Mandzela was responsible for the development of the company.

From 2018 to 2022, he served as Advisor to the General Director for Development at the Russian company OOO "ZHD TRANS", which specializes in the production and supply of spare parts and components for railway equipment.

Since September 2022, he has served as Advisor to the General Director for Development at Modern Rail Systems LLC, which develops and implements rail fastening technologies and track superstructure elements in the Russian market.

In 2022, he became an investor in Mayweather Boxing and Fitness, an international chain of fitness clubs and boxing studios founded by boxer Floyd Mayweather. Jocelin-Patrick Mandzela made a significant contribution to the project's launch in the United Arab Emirates: he is responsible for business development and regional marketing, leveraging his experience in promoting new brands in international markets.

== Consular and public activities ==
On August 25, 2022, he was appointed Honorary Consul of the Republic of the Congo to the Russian Federation. He assumed his duties on April 15, 2023.

Through the international autonomous non-profit organization African Centre (Africa Centrum), he provides assistance in organizing state, official, and working visits by delegations from African countries to CIS countries.

In May 2025, he participated in the 13th Meeting of High Representatives for Security Issues, organized by the Russian Security Council, where he presented the international autonomous non-profit organization African Centre (Africa Centrum) and outlined the key areas of its work. According to the center's head, such presentations are part of a systematic effort to build a meaningful dialogue based on mutual respect.

In July 2023, together with gastronomic expert Alexander Sysoev, organized the "Stars of Africa" gastronomic festival as part of the second Russia-Africa Summit in St. Petersburg. The main idea of the project was to introduce the Russian public to the cultural heritage of the African continent through gastronomy.

In 2024, he participated in the Russian presidential elections as an international expert and observer.

In 2024, he participated in organizing the Republic of Congo national team's visit to the "Alina 2024" festival, held in Sirius, Russia.

In August 2024, Mandzela announced growing interest in Russian education in Africa. He, in turn, is helping Russian universities promote their educational initiatives and programs in African countries.

In September 2025, the African Centre (Africa Centrum) acted as a partner of the III International Symposium “The Future of the Construction Industry: Challenges and Development Prospects” (FCI-2025) at Moscow State University of Civil Engineering (MGSU).

On February 28, 2025, Jocelin-Patrick Mandzela was appointed Honorary President of the Gymnastics Federation of the Republic of Congo.

In March 2025, Mandzela spoke of the need to raise the level of Congolese gymnasts on the international stage.

As early as August 2025, as part of the international sports cooperation being developed through the African Centre (Africa Centrum) platform, training camps for Congolese rhythmic gymnasts were held at the Heavenly Grace Rhythmic Gymnastics Academy.

In September 2025, under the leadership of the African Centre (Africa Centrum), a national rhythmic gymnastics tournament was held in Brazzaville, the capital of the Republic of the Congo, in honor of Olympic champion Alina Kabaeva.

In March 2025, he was appointed Honorary President of the Congolese Federation of Judo and Related Disciplines in recognition of his contribution to youth and sports development in the Republic of the Congo. That same month, with the support of Patrick Mandzela and the African Centre (Africa Centrum), a two-week internship was organized for the Republic of the Congo's national judo and sambo teams at Russian training centers in Sochi and Armavir. The internship program took place ahead of international competitions in Côte d'Ivoire and Guinea, as well as the African School Games in Algeria, where Congolese athletes won two bronze medals.

In June 2026, a delegation of Congolese athletes headed by the Vice President of the National Olympic and Sports Committee of the Republic of the Congo took part in the Young Olympians Forum in Moscow as part of the international sports cooperation being developed through the African Centre (Africa Centrum) platform. As part of this visit, with the assistance of the African Centre (Africa Centrum), a Cooperation Agreement between the Russian Judo Federation and the Judo Federation of the Republic of the Congo was signed at the Russian Olympic Committee.

In May 2025, the African Centre (Africa Centrum) facilitated the participation of athletes from the Republic of the Congo in the "Strike to Power" tournament.

In August 2025, the African Centre (Africa Centrum) facilitated the participation of a Congolese student from Bashkortostan in the World Mas-Wrestling Championship. In the same month, with the assistance of the African Centre (Africa Centrum), female judokas from the Republic of the Congo won two bronze medals at the African School Games in Algeria.

Jocelin-Patrick Mandzela actively contributes to the development of football. In August 2025, as a result of the partnership between the African Centre (Africa Centrum) and the Mini-Football Association of the Congo (ACOMIF), the second annual Challenge Cup mini-football tournament was held in the Republic of the Congo.

In February 2026, with the support of the African Centre (Africa Centrum), an initiative was implemented to hold the amateur football tournament “Friendship Cup: Russia — Africa” in Saint Petersburg.

In May 2026, at the initiative and with the assistance of the African Centre (Africa Centrum), the International Friendship Football Tournament “Russia - Africa” was held in Saint Petersburg.

In June 2026, Jocelin-Patrick Mandzela emphasized that the development of intellectual and educational potential is one of the important areas of Russian-African cooperation. In the same month, the African Centre (Africa Centrum) coordinated interaction among the stakeholders, which resulted in the signing of memorandum of cooperation between Senator and President of the Chess Federation of the Moscow Region Sergey Karjakin, President of the Congolese Chess Association Simon Edgar Emerson Mandzela, and President of the African Centre (Africa Centrum) Jocelin-Patrick Mandzela.

== Awards ==
- Letter of gratitude from Aide to the President of the Russian Federation Yury Ushakov for his active participation in the preparation and conduct of events during the Second Russia-Africa Summit, 2023.
- Gratitude for cooperation during the Second Russia-Africa Summit, as well as for his personal contribution to the development of relations between St. Petersburg and the Republic of the Congo, from St. Petersburg Governor Alexander Dmitrievich Beglov, 2023.
- Honorary Badge of the Security Council of the Russian Federation, 2024.
- Medal of the Security Council of the Russian Federation for services in strengthening information security, 2025.
