= National Sports Agency (Lithuania) =

Agency under the Government of Lithuania

- Nacionalinė sporto agentūra
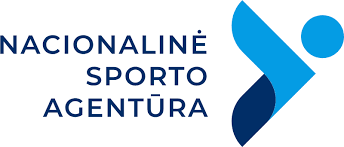

Agency overview
- Formed: 1 July 2022
- Jurisdiction: Government of Lithuania
- Employees: 27
- Annual budget: €60 m
- Agency executive: Mindaugas Špokas

The National Sports Agency (Lithuanian: Nacionalinė sporto agentūra) is a sports management body. It is responsible for the implementation of sports policy in the areas of high-performance sports and physical activity.

== Official duties ==
The agency implements the state sports policy in the areas of high-performance sports and physical activity. The agency also concentrates the functions of financing sports throughout the country, paying equal attention to Olympic and Paralympic sports, and public physical activity. The NSA takes care of sports infrastructure and athletes' rights, assists the country's sports federations and organizations in implementing and strengthening the principles of good governance, administers the awarding of scholarships, bonuses, and annuities for state athletes, announces competitions for physical activity projects and programs, administers funds for high-performance sports, physical activity, and sports infrastructure. The annual budget is about 60 million euros.

== History ==
In 2020, following the closure of the Lithuanian Olympic Sports Center and the Department of Physical Education and Sports, the lack of resources at the Ministry of Education, Science, and Sports became evident in the formulation, administration, and implementation of sports policy. On January 18, 2022, a new version of the Sports Law was adopted. On April 27, 2022, the creation of the National Sports Agency was initiated.

On July 1, 2022, the agency’s regulations were approved, and its activities officially began.

== Director ==
The current director is Mindaugas Špokas.
