= List of flag bearers for the Soviet Union at the Olympics =

Soviet Union at the Olympics
- Flag of the Soviet Union
- IOC code: URS
- NOC: Soviet Olympic Committee
- Medals: Gold 473 Silver 376 Bronze 355 Total 1,204

Summer appearances
- 1952; 1956; 1960; 1964; 1968; 1972; 1976; 1980; 1984; 1988

Winter appearances
- 1956; 1960; 1964; 1968; 1972; 1976; 1980; 1984; 1988

Other related appearances
- Russian Empire (1900–1912); Estonia (1920–1936, 1992–); Latvia (1924–1936, 1992–); Lithuania (1924–1928, 1992–); Unified Team (1992); Armenia (1994–); Belarus (1994–); Georgia (1994–); Kazakhstan (1994–); Kyrgyzstan (1994–); Moldova (1994–); Russia (1994–2016); Ukraine (1994–); Uzbekistan (1994–); Azerbaijan (1996–); Tajikistan (1996–); Turkmenistan (1996–); Olympic Athletes from Russia (2018); ROC (2020–2022); Individual Neutral Athletes (2024)

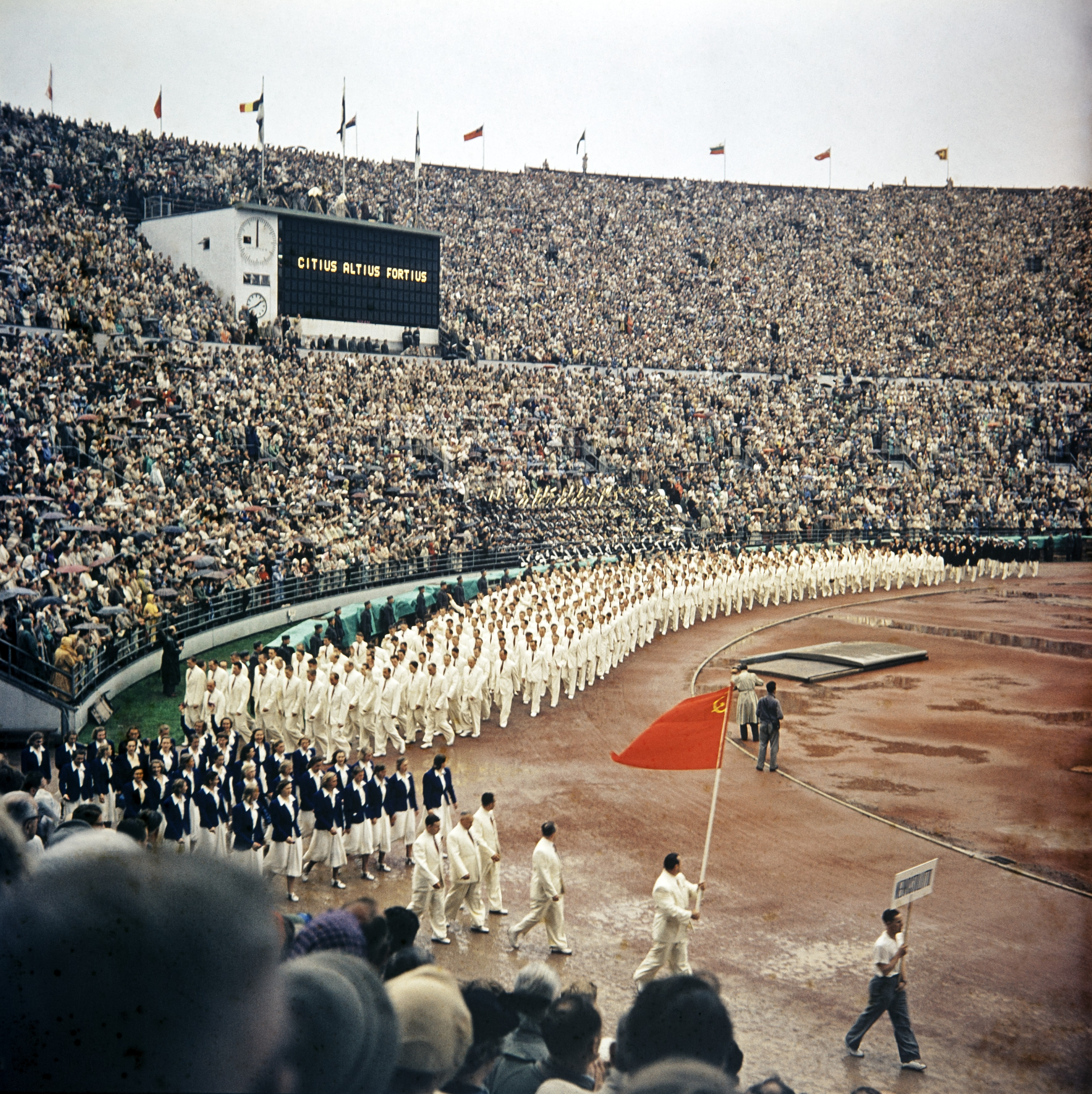
Soviet Union team at the opening ceremony of the 1952 Olympics, led by Yakov Kutsenko

Flag bearers carry the national flag of their country at the opening ceremony of the Olympic Games. Soviet officials expected the flag bearer to show an example of an attractive, physically strong person and a distinguished athlete. He was expected to carry the flag through the Olympic ceremony in one hand unsupported by a harness. This presented a formidable physical task as the flag weighed 16 kilograms (35 lb) in the 1960s, and a sudden wind might further increase the physical load. Hence the Soviet flag bearers at the opening ceremony of the Summer Olympics were selected from among heavyweight weightlifters or wrestlers, who did not have to compete the next day.

Soviet officials also expected the flag bearer to win a gold medal at the given Olympics. This resulted in absurd situations at the 1952 and 1956 Summer Olympics, when the selected flag bearers, Yakov Kutsenko and Aleksey Medvedev respectively, were not allowed to compete because the officials did not believe they would win a gold medal. Both were top-level heavyweight weightlifters. Kutsenko placed second at the 1950 World Championships and Medvedev won the world title in 1956 and 1957.

Below is a list of flag bearers who have represented the Soviet Union at the Olympics.

#	Event year	Season	Flag bearer	Sport
1	1952	Summer	Yakov Kucenko	Weightlifting
2	1956	Winter	Oleg Goncharenko	Speed skating
3	1956	Summer	Aleksey Medvedev	Weightlifting
4	1960	Winter	Nikolai Sologubov	Ice hockey
5	1960	Summer	Yury Vlasov	Weightlifting
6	1964	Winter	Yevgeny Grishin	Speed skating
7	1964	Summer	Yury Vlasov	Weightlifting
8	1968	Winter	Viktor Mamatov	Biathlon
9	1968	Summer	Leonid Zhabotinsky	Weightlifting
10	1972	Winter	Vyacheslav Vedenin	Cross-country skiing
11	1972	Summer	Aleksandr Medved	Wrestling
12	1976	Winter	Vladislav Tretyak	Ice hockey
13	1976	Summer	Vasily Alekseyev	Weightlifting
14	1980	Winter	Alexander Tikhonov	Biathlon
15	1980	Summer	Nikolay Balboshin	Wrestling
16	1984	Winter	Vladislav Tretyak	Ice hockey
17	1988	Winter	Andrey Bukin	Figure skating
18	1988	Summer	Aleksandr Karelin	Wrestling

== See also ==
- Soviet Union at the Olympics
