= Kutsenko =

Kutsenko or Kuzenko (Ukrainian: Куценко) is a gender-neutral Ukrainian surname that may refer to:

- Aleksei Kutsenko (born 1972), Russian football player
- Andriy Kutsenko (1989–2024), Ukrainian track cyclist
- Gosha Kutsenko (born 1967), Russian actor, producer, singer, poet and screenwriter
- Vadim Kutsenko (born 1977), Uzbekistani tennis player
- Valeriy Kutsenko (born 1986), Ukrainian football player
- Yakov Kutsenko (1915–1988), Ukrainian weightlifter
- Yuriy Kutsenko (1952–2018), Soviet decathlete
