= Politics and sports =

Use of sport as a means to influence diplomatic, social, and political relations

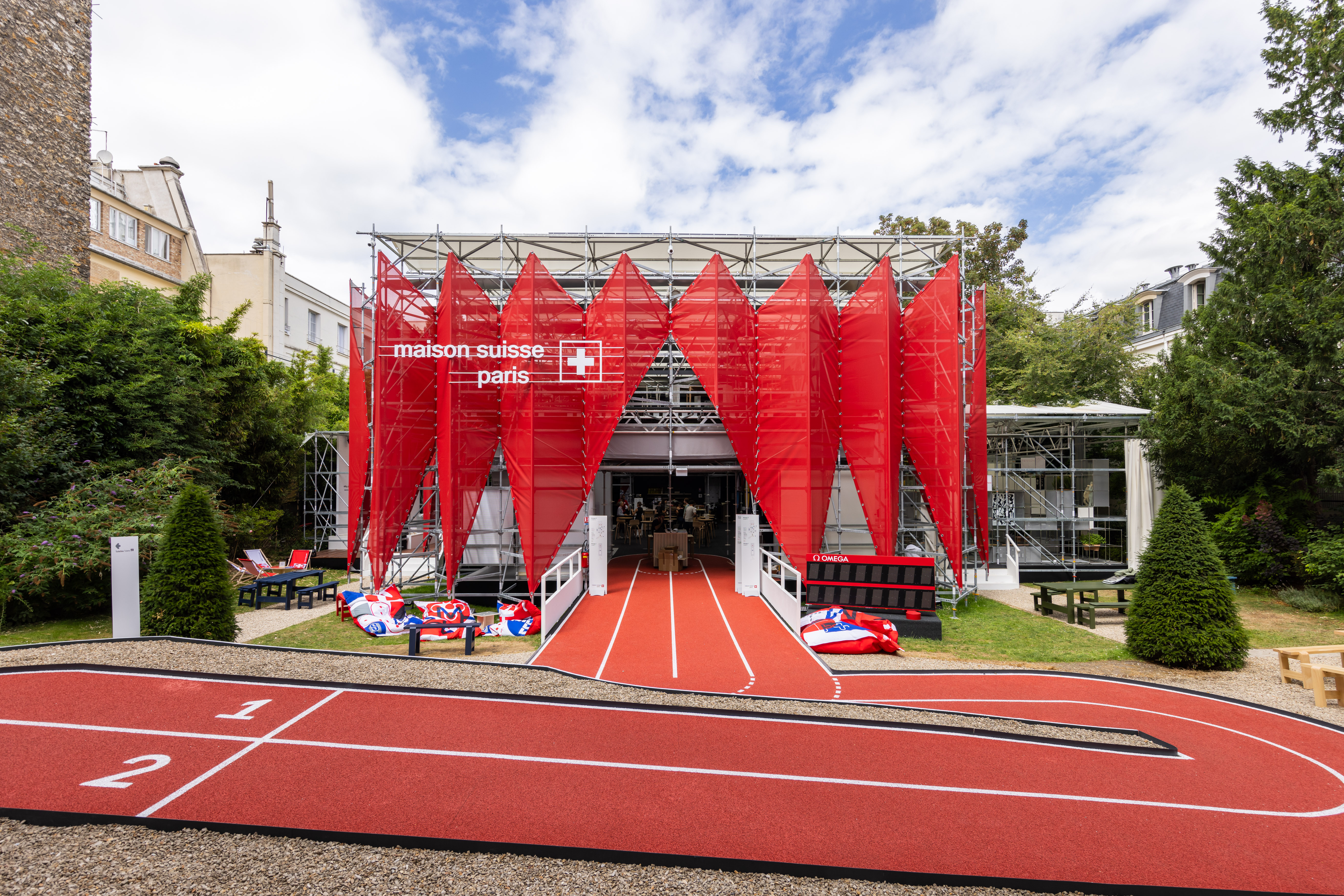
In the service of sports diplomacy: The House of Switzerland at the 2024 Summer Olympics and the 2024 Summer Paralympics in Paris in the garden of the Hôtel de Besenval, the Embassy of the Swiss Confederation.

Politics and sports or sports diplomacy is the use of sport as a means to influence diplomatic, social, and political relations. Sports diplomacy may transcend cultural differences and bring people together. The use of sports and politics has had both positive and negative implications over history. Sports competitions or activities have had the intention to bring about change in certain cases. Nationalistic fervour is sometimes linked to victories or losses to some sport on sports fields.

While the Olympics is often the biggest political example of using sports for diplomatic means, cricket and association football, as well as other sports in the global arena, have also been used in this regard. In the case of Apartheid, sport was used to isolate South Africa and bring about a major overhaul in the country's social structure. While ethnicity, race, social class and more can cause division, sports is also said to help blend differences. Additionally, numerous athletes have sought political office such as Imran Khan and George Weah, some of them unsuccessfully, on either the national level or the sub-national current. Some matches have also had national diplomatic incidents.

== Sports ==
=== Association football ===
In regards to football in Europe, it has been suggested that football has been historically able to simultaneously maintain the differences that give each European country their own sense of identity as well as strengthen the bonds that bind them together as one body. Further, football stadiums in Europe have acted as both places of refuge as well as sites of terrorist attacks and political uprisings. According to Benoit, during the period of the Second World War, European Football underwent a massive transformation. With a coinciding sharp rise in popularity at a time of high political intensity, football became politicized. Therefore, Benoit argues that football began to embody three main characteristics during and after this period, becoming: 1) an agent of international relations in the sense that the foreign policies of European nations became supposedly articulated in football; 2) a source of political propaganda via using football to expose the state; 3) a tool to pacify constituents. Consequently, all of these factors have contributed to the emergence of football and its stadiums as a means of political expression, a basis of recent collective memory, and its emergence as a highly politicized game.

While many clubs do not have a fixed political identity, some clubs are known to have clear leanings. According to YouGov statistics, supporters of the English club Sunderland AFC predominantly lean to the political left, and often sing "The Red Flag" during games. While Sunderland fans are generally regarded as left wing, the hooligan firm Seaburn Casuals was known for having far-right associations.

One of the biggest and oldest football rivalries is the Old Firm rivalry between the Scottish clubs Celtic and Rangers from Glasgow. The competition between the two clubs had roots in more than just a simple sporting rivalry. It has as much to do with Northern Ireland as Scotland and this can be seen in the flags, cultural symbols, and emblems of both clubs. It was infused with a series of complex disputes, sometimes centred on religion (Catholic and Protestant), Northern Ireland-related politics (Loyalist and Republican), national identity (British or Irish Scots), and social ideology (Conservatism and Socialism). The majority of Rangers and Celtic supporters do not get involved in sectarianism, but serious incidents do occur with a tendency for the actions of a minority to dominate the headlines. The Old Firm rivalry fuelled many assaults on Derby days, and some deaths in the past have been directly related to the aftermath of Old Firm matches. An activist group that monitors sectarian activity in Glasgow has reported that on Old Firm weekends, violent attacks increase ninefold over normal levels. An increase in domestic abuse can also be attributed to Old Firm fixtures.

=== Bandy ===
Norway declined to take part in the 1957 Bandy World Championship because the Soviet Union was invited, due to the Soviet invasion of Hungary the year before. The country made a similar protest for the 1969 Bandy World Championship because of the Warsaw Pact invasion of Czechoslovakia that year, handing over the hosting of the 1969 event to Sweden.

Ukraine declined to take part in the 2015 Bandy World Championship hosted by Russia because of the Russian annexation of Crimea the year before, since Ukraine still considers Crimea as part of its territory.

=== Boxing ===
Heavyweight champion Max Schmeling had been lauded by the Nazi Party as a heroic symbol of German destiny and Aryan supremacy. A politically charged boxing match with Joe Louis was preceded nationalistic symbolism and imagery. Schmeling defeated Louis, for the latter's first professional defeat in 1936. Langston Hughes recalled the national reaction to Louis' defeat.

I walked down Seventh Avenue and saw grown men weeping like children, and women sitting in the curbs with their head in their hands. All across the country that night when the news came out that Joe was knocked out, people cried. – Langston Hughes

Schmeling, by contrast, was welcomed home with a jubilant reaction. Hitler sent his wife flowers with the message: "For the wonderful victory of your husband, our greatest German boxer, I must congratulate you with all my heart." Schmeling responded to the accolades saying: "At this moment I have to tell Germany, I have to report to the Führer in particular, that the thoughts of all my countrymen were with me in this fight; that the Führer and his faithful people were thinking of me. This thought gave me the strength to succeed in this fight. It gave me the courage and the endurance to win this victory for Germany's colours."

A rematch was scheduled later in New York City. In the build-up to the event U.S. President Franklin D. Roosevelt offered his support: "Joe, we need muscles like yours to beat Germany." Schmeling's hotel was picketed by American protestors after an accompanying Nazi Party publicist declared that a black man could not defeat Schmeling and that when he won, his prize money would be used to build German tanks. Louis won the rematch in a first round knock out and he became the focal point of anti-Nazi sentiment leading up to World War II. Louis later recalled the pressure on him before the fight: "I knew I had to get Schmeling good. I had my own personal reasons and the whole damned country was depending me." After the war the two men would reconnect and strike up a personal friendship.

Decades later, Cassius Clay, better known as Muhammad Ali, took up political causes in his refusal to be drafted for the Vietnam War amid the Civil Rights Movement during the presidency of Lyndon B. Johnson.

After earning the championship, Clay converted his religion to Islam, which instigated conflict with his boxing career. He also abandoned his name that was given to his slave ancestors and adopted the new name Muhammad Ali. On 28 April 1967, he refused to serve in the Army during the Vietnam War, stating religious reasons, namely that it goes against the Qur'an's teaching.

I ain't got no quarrel with those Vietcong...no Vietcong ever called me nigger. – Muhammad Ali

He then became an icon of not only the civil rights struggle, but also the anti-Vietnam War movement. However he was convicted of draft evasion, sentenced to five years in prison, fined $10,000 and stripped of his championship. It was not until a lawsuit in 1970 that Ali redeemed his title. He would continue in historical boxing matches now known as Rumble in the Jungle in 1974 and Thrilla in Manila in 1975, defeating George Foreman and Joe Frazier, respectively.

=== Chess ===
Chess, which is a recognized sport of the International Olympic Committee, has a history of being linked to political issues. World Champion Alexander Alekhine collaborated with National-Socialist Germany during the Second World War. Cold War politics featured in the 1972 World Championship match between the American Bobby Fischer and Boris Spassky of the Soviet Union, when Fischer defeated Spassky and temporarily halted Soviet chess dominance; and again in the 1978 World Championship match, when the Soviet Anatoly Karpov narrowly defeated Viktor Korchnoi, who had recently defected from the Soviet Union. Several countries boycotted the 1976 Chess Olympiad, because it was held in Israel.

=== Cricket ===
In 1969, the Marylebone Cricket Club refused to allow Basil D'Oliveira to play for England against South Africa for fear of upsetting the apartheid regime. D'Oliveira was a coloured born in South Africa and refused permission to play for the South African team by the government, instead he played for England. Following his performance against Australia in the previous year's Ashes, D'Oliveira was one of the most likely players to be selected. However, he was not selected; although the selection committee claimed this was a cricketing decision, it was viewed by the cricketing public as a capitulation towards the apartheid regime. After a withdrawal from the squad, D'Oliveira was selected, enraging the Apartheid regime and resulting in the tour's cancellation.

Cricket has also played a role in sporting diplomacy. Following the Soviet invasion of Afghanistan, and Soviet pressure on India to deflect the tension they faced, in 1987 Pakistan's president at the time, General Zia ul-Haq, attended a test match between India and Pakistan in Jaipur – a visit that apparently helped cool a flare-up in tensions. Furthermore, following a fifteen-year lull in test matches, cricket tours between India and Pakistan were revived in 2004 in the wake of diplomatic initiatives to bury half a century of mutual hostility. Both sides relaxed their tough visa regulations for each other, allowing thousands of fans to travel across the border.

In an attempt to replicate the cricket diplomacy of the past General Pervez Musharraf came to India in 2005 ostensibly for a cricket match. The trip, however, quickly took on the air of a summit as the sides were urged "to seize a historic chance to end their dispute over Kashmir." Often this rivalry has been tinged with a religious-political bent to it. A Pakistani fan in Karachi ran onto the pitch to attack the Indian captain, and fans threw stones at the Indian players during the match in Karachi. In 2000 right-wing Hindus dug up the cricket pitch in New Delhi to protest against the Pakistani team's visit. Following the Kargil conflict, and at various other times, there have also been calls to suspend cricketing ties between the two countries.

In reference to immigrants from the Caribbean and South Asia, British Conservative party member Norman Tebbit once said that a "cricket test" could adjudge a person's loyalty to England by determining whether or not they supported the England and Wales cricket team ahead of those from their own countries of origin.

In 2008, the England and Wales Cricket Board cancelled Zimbabwe's 2009 tour of England and suspended all bilateral relations between the two states in response to the situation regarding the 2008 Zimbabwean presidential election. MPs Jack Straw and Tessa Jowell wrote to the International Cricket Council asking then to ban Zimbabwe from international cricket.

China have participated in cricket diplomacy. Cross-Strait relations have been the impetus for doing so. During the buildup to the 2007 World Cup, Antigua received a $55 million grant to build the Sir Vivian Richards Stadium, while Jamaica received $30 million for a new Trelawny stadium. St. Lucia have also got both a cricket and a football stadium courtesy of China. Over the past few years, China spent a remarkable $132 million on cricket facilities in the West Indies, a massive amount compared to the International Cricket Council's 10-year budget of $70 million to promote cricket globally. It has been suggested that the motive for China's generosity is because "Most of the remaining countries that recognize Taiwan are located in the Caribbean and Latin America." The diplomacy paid off in the end as Grenada and Dominica derecognized Taiwan as an independent country. Further, "Of the remaining 24 countries that recognize Taiwan, four are in the Caribbean and two of these play cricket." Grenada previously had a stadium built by Taiwan, but saw it destroyed by a hurricane. China quickly erected another stadium. Consequently, Taiwan took Grenada to a New York City court to force the latter to return the original loan. However, in 2007, St. Lucia severed its diplomatic ties with China and restored its ties with Taiwan.

A beleaguered Taiwan also used the World Cup to shore up its position among its shrinking West Indian support base. It donated $21 million to St. Kitts and Nevis and $12 million to the even smaller St. Vincent and the Grenadines for cricket grounds. China's aggressive ambitions have benefited the Caribbean Islands as "Strategic analysts say China is laying out more money than is needed to just isolate Taiwan. China, which has built large embassies in each of the islands, now has a bigger diplomatic presence in the Caribbean than the United States, the superpower next door." And that "Mainland China's long-term strategy coincides with its foreign policy."

Following the death of Saeed Anwar's daughter he took to a more fundamental Islam and started growing a beard. He was then said to have been the turning point in the Islamisation of the Pakistani cricket team, which was also a reason for Yousuf Youhana's conversion to Islam. From the 2003 World Cup a more visible trend of religion was seen in the Pakistan team with many players having become more devout to the point of either leading prayers or growing beards as a symbol of being a "good Muslim" (with the notable exception of Shoaib Akhtar and Danish Kaneria (the latter being the only Hindu on the team)). Even post-match interviews were preceded by Islamic salutations such as Bismillah ur Rehman rahim. After the loss to arch-rival India at the 2007 ICC World Twenty20 Shoaib Malik came under fire for apologising "I want to thank everyone back home in Pakistan and Muslims all over the world. Thank you very much and I'm sorry that we didn't win, but we did give our 100 per cent" for the defeat, which was ironic considering Irfan Pathan, a Muslim was named Man of the Match for his performance in India's win, and Shah Rukh Khan was in the stands supporting India.

Following the 2007 World Cup and the loss to Ireland (an unranked cricket team), the religious influence was criticised for taking a toll on the team. The Islamisation of such a Western sport in Pakistan was seen as symbolic of the growing influence of religion in every field. In Pakistan, this trend was attributed to dating back to the tenure of the military government of General Zia-ul Haq where the focus of the youth was shifted from Pakistan as a nation-state and cultural-religious pluralism to Islam as a transnational identity, greater attention to conservative Islamic ritualism, and a perception of a global conspiracy against Muslims and admiration for militancy. A need was also seen to reorient sportsmen towards professionalism, discipline and rules and regulations. It was said that the focus of education and socialisation needed to return to a Pakistan that could not afford to be at war.

In 2011, India and Pakistan played each other in the 2011 Cricket World Cup for the first time since 26/11 attacks in Mumbai and a general souring of relations. The event was spontaneously attended by Prime Ministers Yousaf Raza Gillani of Pakistan and Manmohan Singh of India. Following the game, permission was granted for the two countries to play regular series against each other.

=== Formula One ===
Amid the Bahraini uprising, Avaaz.org called for sports boycotts, comparing the situation in Bahrain with that of apartheid South Africa. Other human rights protesters also called for a boycott of the Bahrain Grand Prix with more explicit comparisons to the sporting boycott of South Africa. On 17 February, it was announced that the second round of GP2 Asia Series, which was to be held at Bahrain International Circuit on 17–19 February, had been cancelled due to security and safety concerns surrounding the protests. On 21 February, the 2011 Bahrain Grand Prix, then to take place on 13 March, was again cancelled because of the same concerns. Similarly, the 2012 Bahrain Grand Prix, which was held amid claims from Bernie Ecclestone that there was no trouble, faced weekly protests and violence leading up to the event.

In 2021, Formula One announced that one of its event will be held in Saudi Arabia. The move has been criticized by many human rights group as example of Saudi Arabia "sportswashing". The Grand Prix has received criticism from Amnesty International on the grounds of human rights in Saudi Arabia. Human Rights Watch also condemned the decision arguing that "it is part of a cynical strategy to distract from Saudi Arabia's human rights abuses". Formula One responded by saying that "[Formula One has] made our position on human rights and other issues clear to all our partners and host countries who commit to respect human rights in the way their events are hosted and delivered" and that "[Formula One has] worked hard to be a positive force everywhere it races, including economic, social and cultural benefits". In February 2021, 45 human rights organizations called on Lewis Hamilton to boycott the Grand Prix citing Saudi Arabia's role in the Yemeni Civil War, its detention of women's rights activists, and the murder of The Washington Post journalist Jamal Khashoggi. Hamilton himself stated that he felt uncomfortable racing in the country. After the 2022 race folded, Saudi Arabian government invited Hamilton for a talks in Saudi Arabia to sit down over human rights concerns after Hamilton criticized the host country numerous times.

The 2022 Saudi Arabian Grand Prix was impacted by the Saudi-led war on Yemen. Yemen's Houthi rebels carried out a missile attack on an Aramco oil depot (approximately 16 kilometres (10 miles) from the circuit), causing an explosion, during the first of two practice sessions. The incident highlighted risks for the race, with drivers, such as Lewis Hamilton, raising concerns over the event's safety. After discussions lasting several hours, an agreement was reached to hold the event. Besides the attack, there were serious questions over the years of human rights abuses in Saudi Arabia. The authoritative regime was criticised for its continued repression of dissidents, particularly in light of the mass execution of 81 people two weeks before the race.

In 2020, Formula One Group launched "We Race As One" initiative in the wake of Black Lives Matter movement gaining prominence in 2020. Since 2020 season some drivers are taking a knee to show solidarity. The movement focused on three aspects: sustainability, diversity and inclusion, and community. The move received mixed reaction among fans, some fans criticized the move as ironic as some races are still being held in countries with poor human rights record such as Bahrain, Saudi Arabia, Qatar, Russia, China, Azerbaijan, etc. In 2022, Formula One decided to scrap the "We Race As One" gesture, however the move was criticized by some drivers.

=== Olympics ===
Going as far back as the 1936 Olympics, Adolf Hitler used this as a stage to promote Aryan nationalism for Germany with his ideological belief of racial supremacy. The Olympics were used as a method of hardening the German spirit and instilling unity among German youth. It was also believed that sport was a "way to weed out the weak, Jewish, and other undesirables." As a result, many Jews and Gypsies were banned from participating in sporting events. While Germany did top the medal table, the Nazi depiction of ethnic Africans as inferior was dispelled by Jesse Owens' gold medals in the 100m, 200m, 4 × 100 m relay and long jump events. There were questions as to whether Hitler acknowledged Owens' victories. On the first day of competition, Hitler left the stadium after only shaking hands with the German victors. An Olympic committee member then insisted that Hitler either greet every medalist or none at all; he chose the latter. At the games he was visited by Adi Dassler, who would later found Adidas and offered new shoes to Owens.

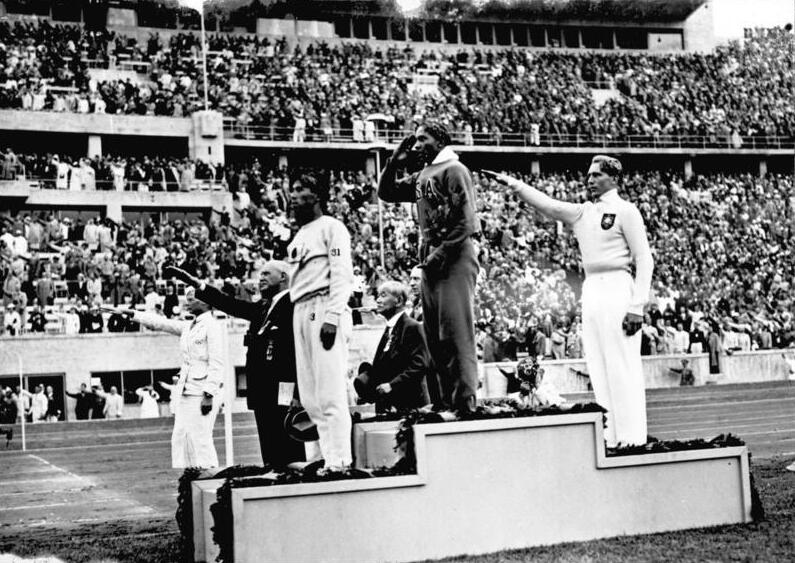
Jesse Owens on the podium after winning the long jump at the 1936 Summer Olympics. L-R, on podium, Naoto Tajima, Owens, Luz Long.

Hitler had a certain time to come to the stadium and a certain time to leave. It happened he had to leave before the victory ceremony after the 100 meters. But before he left I was on my way to a broadcast and passed near his box. He waved at me and I waved back. I think it was bad taste to criticise the 'man of the hour' – Jesse Owens

In 1964, Indonesia and other socialist countries decided to boycott the 1964 Summer Olympics as a response for Indonesian suspension from the IOC. The trouble began after the Asian Games in 1962 in Jakarta which Indonesia hosted and for which Taiwan and Israel were refused entry cards. Despite being readmitted to the IOC, Sukarno decided to boycott the Olympics and responded by declaring: "The International Olympic Games have proved to be openly an imperialistic tool… Now let's frankly say, sports have something to do with politics. Indonesia proposes now to mix sports with politics, and let us now establish the Games of the New Emerging Forces, the GANEFO… against the Old Established Order." As a response, Sukarno held a parallel Olympics, GANEFO, inviting People's Republic of China and North Korea of whom had friendly relations at the time. GANEFO would later collapse after the rise of Suharto which the 2nd Asian GANEFO was scheduled to be held in Pyongyang

Once again, in 1968, the global stage of the Olympics was used to show the world the plight of the African-American struggle during the civil rights movement in their home country. The famous Black Power salute was performed by Tommie Smith and John Carlos during the medal ceremony in Mexico City. Věra Čáslavská, in protest to the 1968 Soviet-led invasion of Czechoslovakia and the controversial decision by the judges on the Balance Beam and Floor, turned her head down and away from the Soviet flag whilst the anthem played during the medal ceremony. She returned home as a heroine of the Czechoslovak people, but was made an outcast by the Soviet dominated government.

In 1972, several athletes of the Israeli Olympic team were killed in an attack by Palestinian gunmen of the Black September terrorist organization that started at the Olympic village and eventually resulted in the deaths of 11 members of the Israeli Olympic team who were targeted in the Munich massacre in West Germany.

The 1980 Winter Olympics were used in a much less overtly political way, but in a much more culturally politically significant way. The United States men's Ice Hockey team defeated the USSR National team in the semi-final round. This win by the United States team was much more than just an Olympic game, the Soviets had been superior on the ice against everyone and had recently beaten the NHL All Star team. The US Olympic team was all amateurs with an average age of 21, while the Soviets were quasi-professional. The shocking victory in Lake Placid, during one of the heights of the Cold War brought about renewed nationalism and belief among the citizens of the United States and shock and shame to the Soviets.

The Soviet invasion of Afghanistan led to a boycott of the 1980 Moscow Olympics by numerous Western states and their allies in protest of the host country's actions. In the 1984 Los Angeles Olympics, the Soviet Bloc led a retaliatory boycott of the games in response to the American-led Moscow games boycott.

Following the cancellation of wrestling at the Olympics in the 2010s, traditional political rivals Iran, Russia and the United States joined forces to annul the measure. The U.S. hosted a publicity event in New York City with athletes from all three countries to campaign for its reinstatement.

=== Table tennis ===
As part of America's policy of rapprochement with China, the 1970s saw exchanges between table tennis players from the United States and the People's Republic of China that eventually led to U.S. President Richard Nixon's 1972 visit to China. Ping pong diplomacy began when the Chinese table tennis team invited their U.S. counterparts to their country on an all-expense-paid trip during the 1971 World Table Tennis Championships in Japan and on April 10, 1971, a group made up of American table tennis players and journalists became the first American delegation to set foot in the Chinese capital since 1949. Thirty-six years later, a three-day "Ping-Ping Diplomacy" event was held at the Richard Nixon Presidential Library and Museum which some of the members from the 1971 U.S. and Chinese teams were able to participate in.

=== Tennis ===
In 2008, Israeli professional tennis players Shahar Pe'er, Tzipi Obziler, Andy Ram, and Yoni Erlich were supposed to feature in ATP and WTA tournaments in the Arab cities of Doha and Dubai, respectively, despite bans on Israeli passport holders from entering both countries. Pe'er was refused a visa to Dubai the following year following the Gaza War with the organisers saying "We do not wish to politicise sport but we have to be sensitive to recent events in the whole region and not alienate or put at risk the players or the many tennis fans of different nationalities that we have in the United Arab Emirates." The WTA chief executive Larry Scott later reacted saying some "sanctions" would be issued on Dubai. She also faced protests following the war during a tournament in New Zealand.

During the 2010 US Open tennis tournament, India's Rohan Bopanna and Pakistan's Aisam-ul-Haq Qureshi reached the men's doubles finals, eliciting responses from political leaders in both countries. Supporters from both countries, including the respective United Nations ambassadors, sat in the stands together. Rashid Malik, Pakistan's Davis Cup coach, said "The success of their team so far has been a big encouragement for both countries, it will only have a peaceful and positive impact on their people." Manohar Singh Gill, India's sports minister, asked "I have one question for everyone. If Bopanna and Qureshi can play together, why cannot India and Pakistan?"

The two were also involved in another campaign promoted by the Monaco-based Peace and Sport when they wore sweat shirts with slogans reading "Stop War, Start Tennis." They refer to themselves as the "Indo-Pak Express". Such a high-profile collaboration meant this was read as a "unique" partnership. Qureshi said "It just feels like us doing well on the bigger level is getting the message across throughout the world – if me and Rohan can get along so well there's no reason the Indians and Pakistanis can't get along with each other. If even two or three per cent of people say, 'If they can get along why can't we?' that's what we're trying to do. "They're all mixed together sitting in the crowd. You can't tell who is Pakistani and who is Indian. That's the beauty about sports. Before our pairing you would never see that in any sports, fighting for one cause. It's really good to be part of it."

After their finals defeat, Qureshi spoke to the crowd to "say something on behalf of all Pakistanis, [that] every time I come here, there's a wrong perception about the people of Pakistan. They are very friendly, very loving people. We want peace in this world as much as you guys." He then made a political appeal to the controversial "Ground Zero mosque" saying "For me, as a Muslim, that's what makes America the greatest country in the world – freedom of religion, freedom of speech. If the mosque is built, I think it's a huge gesture to all the Muslim community out there in the world. I would really appreciate it." Indian and Pakistani fans filled the stadium for the final as the two U.N. ambassadors again sat together in the President's Box. Pakistan's ambassador Abdullah Hussain Haroon said "They've proven that when Indians and Pakistanis get together we can raise fire. I think on a people-to-people basis, they're setting an example that the politicians should follow."

== Countries ==
=== Australia ===
In 2025, Australia agreed to fund the participation of a team from Papua New Guinea in the Australian National Rugby League competition. This was seen as a way to shore up bilateral relations between the two countries, possibly offsetting the growing relationship between Papua New Guinea and China.

=== China ===
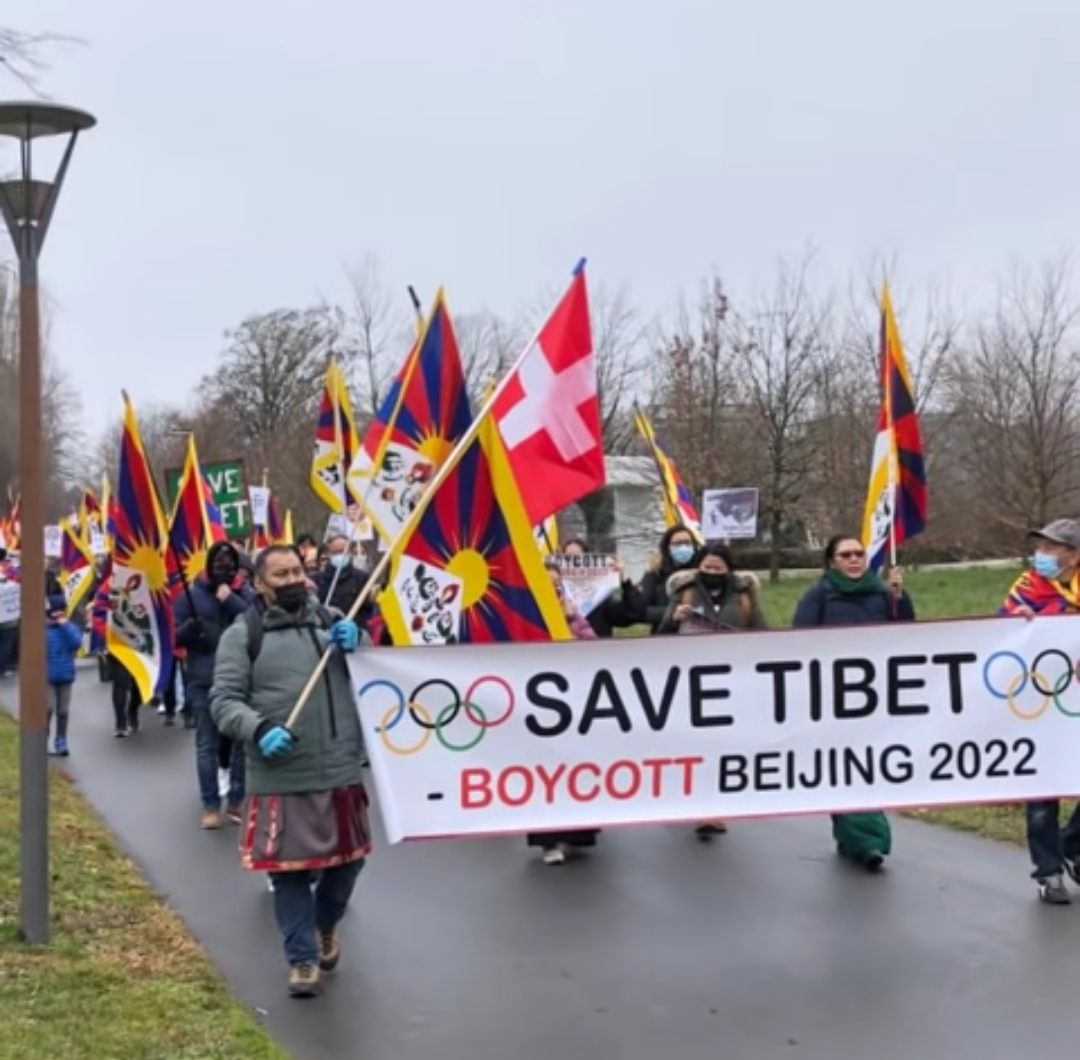
Protests against Chinese Winter Olympics held in Lausanne, Switzerland

In the 1950s, the State Physical Culture and Sports Commission under General He Long conducted sports exchanges with the Soviet Union and eastern Europe.

After stopping competing during the earlier parts of the Cultural Revolution, in 1970 China's national teams began competing again. The first major international event a Chinese team participated in since 1966 was the World Table Tennis Championship in Nagoya, Japan, which ultimately led to the ping-pong diplomacy with the United States. Ping-pong diplomacy resulted of an encounter between players Glenn Cowan (of the US) and Zhuang Zedong (of the PRC). The event paved the way for President Richard Nixon's visit to Beijing in 1972 and has been seen as a key turning point in relations between the United States and the People's Republic of China.

In the early 1970s, the State Physical Culture and Sports Commission was tasked with facilitating sports diplomacy. In 1974, it exchanged 172 groups of 3,200 athletes with eighty other countries, most of them in the Third World.

In 2019, the politicization of sports in China has been expanded internationally. In the wake of 2019–2020 Hong Kong protests some NBA athletes and managers. Houston Rockets general manager Daryl Morey voiced his solidarity with the protesters. The situation has caused backlash Chinese government and some Chinese nationalists. After the statement from Morey, Chinese state media CCTV has suspended the broadcast of NBA games in the country until Morey retract his statement. At the same time, Chinese Basketball Association suspended its relationship with Houston Rockets. Brooklyn Nets owner Joseph Tsai has also lobbied NBA to fire Morey.

In December 2019, Mesut Özil went online to publish a poem denouncing the treatment of Uyghurs in China. As a response, state broadcasters CCTV and PP Sports responded two days later by removing the match between Arsenal and Manchester City from their schedules, while his likeness was removed from Chinese internet providers and version of eFootball PES 2020. In September 2020, English Premier League axed US$650 million contract to broadcast games through Chinese streaming service PPTV over alleged failed payments. Some pundits believe that the deal was axed due to British government granting the British National (Overseas) passport to Hong Kongers fleeing political persecution.

China's Ministry of Public Security's Spamouflage disinformation network transitioned to primarily push Olympic messaging in December 2021. In the run up to the Olympics, the Chinese government deployed dozens of fake Twitter accounts to push the Government's position in the Peng Shuai scandal and the IOC's involvement. During the torch relay, a Chinese soldier who was involved in 2020–2022 China–India skirmishes was selected to join the torch relay, the move later angered the neighbouring India. Several countries has decided to do a diplomatic boycott. During the opening ceremony, parade representing the 56 ethnic groups of China, one of the performers, reportedly representing Korean Chinese, wore a hanbok. The move has drawn criticism from several South Korean citizens and politicians citing cultural appropriation.

=== South Africa ===
Most famously, the sporting boycott of South Africa during Apartheid was said to have played a crucial role in forcing South Africa to open up their society and to end a global isolation. South Africa was excluded from the 1964 Summer Olympics, and many sports' governing bodies expelled or suspended membership of South African affiliates. It was said that the "international boycott of apartheid sport has been a powerful means for sensitising world opinion against apartheid and in mobilising millions of people for action against that despicable system." This boycott "in some cases helped change official policies."

The South African Table Tennis Board (SATTB), a body founded in contravention to the white South African table tennis board, was replaced for the latter by the International Table Tennis Federation. While the SATTB team was able to participate in the world championships held in Stockholm in 1957, team members were immediately refused passports by the government. It ruled that no black could compete internationally except through the white sports body.

Started in 1980, the United Nations "Register of Sports Contacts with South Africa" – a record of sports exchanges with South Africa and a list of sportsmen who have participated in sports events in South Africa – prove to be an effective instrument to discourage collaboration with apartheid sport. In the 1980s South Africa was also expelled from most international sports bodies. The International Olympic Committee even adopted a declaration against "apartheid in sport" on 21 June 1988, for the total isolation of apartheid sport.

The country's hosting and winning of the 1995 Rugby World Cup was a powerful boost to post-apartheid South Africa's return to the international sporting scene. The 2010 FIFA World Cup in South Africa also drew similar parallels and questions as to whether race could be overcome, this was especially true following the death of Eugene Terreblanche.

=== Soviet Union ===
Soviet Olympic team was notorious for skirting the edge of amateur rules. All Soviet athletes held some nominal jobs, but were in fact state-sponsored and trained full-time. According to many experts, that gave the Soviet Union a huge advantage over the United States and other Western countries, whose athletes were students or real amateurs. Indeed, the Soviet Union monopolized the top place in the medal standings after 1968, and, until its collapse, placed second only once, in the 1984 Winter games, after another Eastern bloc nation, the GDR. Amateur rules were relaxed only in the late 1980s and were almost completely abolished in the 1990s, after the fall of the USSR.

==== Doping ====
According to British journalist Andrew Jennings, a KGB colonel stated that the agency's officers had posed as anti-doping authorities from the International Olympic Committee (IOC) to undermine doping tests and that Soviet athletes were "rescued with [these] tremendous efforts". On the topic of the 1980 Summer Olympics, a 1989 Australian study said "There is hardly a medal winner at the Moscow Games, certainly not a gold medal winner, who is not on one sort of drug or another: usually several kinds. The Moscow Games might as well have been called the Chemists' Games."

Documents obtained in 2016 revealed the Soviet Union's plans for a statewide doping system in track and field in preparation for the 1984 Summer Olympics in Los Angeles. Dated prior to the country's decision to boycott the Games, the document detailed the existing steroids operations of the program, along with suggestions for further enhancements. The communication, directed to the Soviet Union's head of track and field, was prepared by Dr. Sergei Portugalov of the Institute for Physical Culture. Portugalov was also one of the main figures involved in the implementation of the Russian doping program prior to the 2016 Summer Olympics.

==== Flag bearers controversy ====
Soviet officials expected the flag bearer to show an example of an attractive, physically strong person and a distinguished athlete. He was expected to carry the flag through the Olympic ceremony in one hand unsupported by a harness. This presented a formidable physical task as the flag weighed 16 kilograms (35 lb) in the 1960s, and a sudden wind might further increase the physical load. Hence the Soviet flag bearers at the opening ceremony of the Summer Olympics were selected from among heavyweight weightlifters or wrestlers, who did not have to compete the next day.

Soviet officials also expected the flag bearer to win a gold medal at the given Olympics. This resulted in absurd situations at the 1952 and 1956 Summer Olympics, when the selected flag bearers, Yakov Kutsenko and Aleksey Medvedev respectively, were not allowed to compete because the officials did not believe they would win a gold medal. Both were top-level heavyweight weightlifters. Kutsenko placed second at the 1950 World Championships and Medvedev won the world title in 1956 and 1957.

=== United States ===
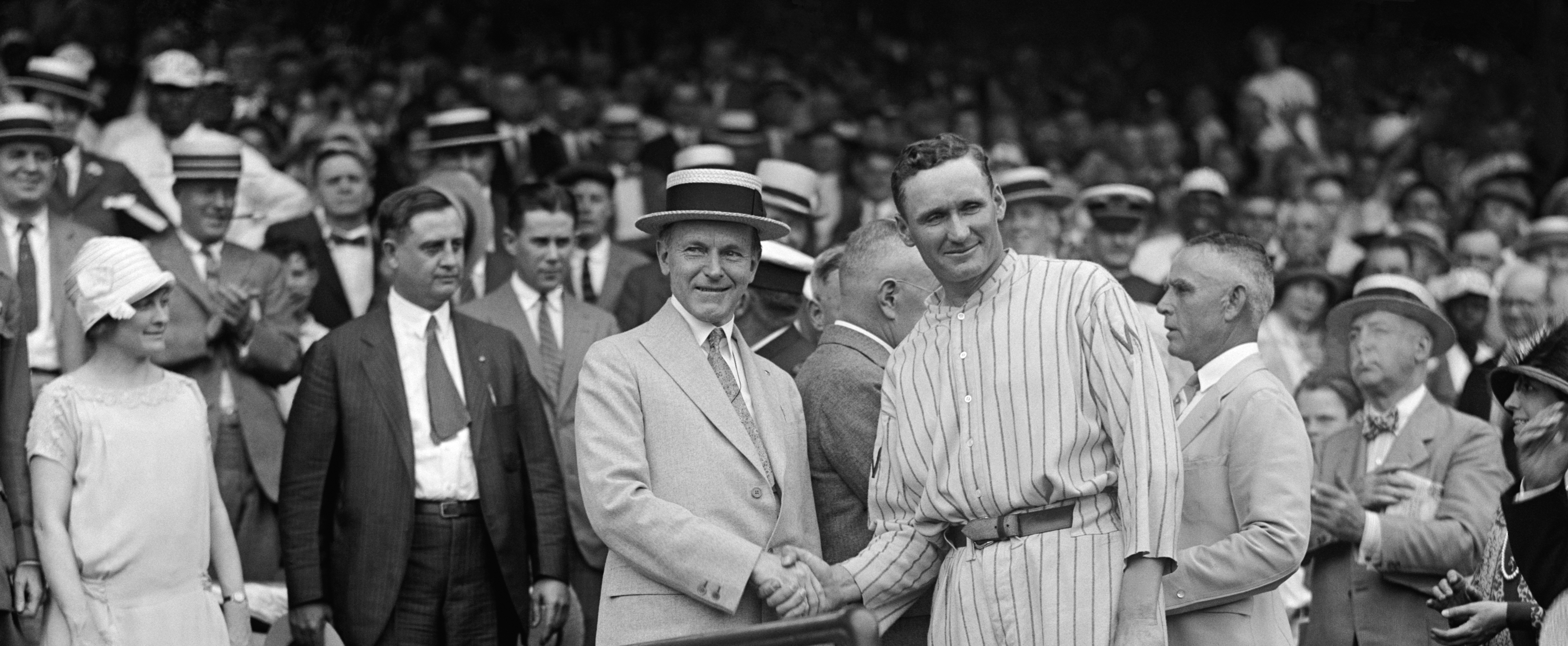
US President Calvin Coolidge (left) and Washington Senators pitcher Walter Johnson (right) shake hands.

Fans of NASCAR are generally considered by the media of the United States to fall within the Republican base as an "almost exclusively white, conservative racing crowd", the "white, middle-aged, working-class Southern men" who were coveted in the first decades of the 21st century during electoral campaigns. Joe Gibbs, a NASCAR team owner, spoke at the 2008 Republican National Convention. Almost 90 percent of political contributions from those affiliated with NASCAR go to Republican candidates. Texas Governor, Rick Perry sponsored 2000 NASCAR Winston Cup Series Champion Bobby Labonte's car for an election campaign in 2010. Labonte was reported to have been paid $225,000 to carry the "rickperry.org" logo. Two years later, Rick Santorum sponsored Tony Raines' car. In 2000, then Republican primary candidate Rudy Giuliani made an appearance at the Daytona International Speedway.

A study of elections has shown that the result of sports events can affect the overall results. A study published in the Proceedings of the National Academy of Sciences showed that when the home team wins the game before the election, the incumbent candidates can increase their share of the vote by 1.5 percent, while a loss had the opposite effect. The study looked at NCAA football games from 1946 to 2008. In addition, the study found that colleges with higher attendance rates had a larger effect on the results, up to 3%. The effects are increased even further if the game is an upset, that is, if the team expected to win does not. Other studies have confirmed these results for other sports, such as baseball and basketball. The study authors concluded that the win made voters feel better about society, boosting votes for the incumbent, while losses made voters feel worse, sending votes to the challenger. There was some speculation that the result of certain games could even decide the 2012 United States presidential election.

In the 2010 United States elections, at least five former athletes ran on Republican tickets for political office. Chris Dudley took part in his first political race for Governor of Oregon after playing for the Portland Trail Blazers. He also helped persuade former Philadelphia Eagles' Jon Runyan to run for New Jersey's 3rd congressional district against a first-term Democrat John Adler. Shawn Bradley of the Philadelphia 76ers and Dallas Mavericks ran for a seat in Utah's legislature; Keith Fimian, who played for the Cleveland Browns, sought a House seat from Virginia; and former Washington Redskins' Clint Didier sought a Republican nomination for Senate in Washington state. Only Runyan won his election.

Baseball players union boss Don Fehr contributed to the presidential primaries for George W. Bush, Al Gore, Bill Bradley and John McCain. Cincinnati Reds owner Carl Lindner contributed $1.4 million to the Republican party and $1 million to the US Democratic party. Former MLB pitcher Jim Bunning was also a senator once. NFL quarterback Heath Shuler has served as a member of the House of Representatives, as well as Seattle Seahawks receiver Steve Largent and Oklahoma Sooners quarterback J.C. Watts. Former Buffalo Bills quarterback Jack Kemp was a nine term congressman who chaired the House Republican Leadership Conference and served as Secretary of Housing and Urban Development under President George H. W. Bush. Kemp was the 1996 Republican candidate for vice president. Bill Bradley, who played basketball for the New York Knicks, served three terms in the U.S. Senate representing New Jersey.

Olympic gold medalist Carl Lewis planned to run for office from New Jersey, though his attempt was blocked and he awaited an appeal hearing.

In 2002, the US State Department initiated a sports exchange programme entitled SportsUnited to encourage dialogue between children from the ages of 7–17. The programme seeks to bring together international students with their counterparts in the U.S. to establish links with American professional athletes and to expose them to American culture. Another programme encourages U.S. athletes to travel to and learn about foreign cultures and the challenges young people face in other countries. SportsUnited has partaken in 15 different sports in nearly 70 countries.

In 2016, San Francisco 49ers quarterback Colin Kaepernick sat during the national anthem in protest of police violence, which led to widespread controversy surrounding the national anthem.

=== North Korea ===
==== Football World Cup ====
North Korea's relationships with the international community, especially South Korea, have sometimes been shaped by sports diplomacy. In the 1966 World Cup, North Korea defeated the heavily favored Italian team. Kim Jong-il believed that successful athletics increases the strength of a country, promoted its ideology, brought a country great honor and increased its international reputation. For this reason, this victory has become propaganda used by the North Korean regime to present a reputable country to not only their citizens, but also to the international community as a whole. Although North Korea has not had much success since this victory, North Korea participated in the 2010 World Cup. In addition, North Korea was surrounded by controversy during 2006 World Cup qualifying. Fan violence in Pyongyang after a match with Iran led to North Korea playing a home game in Thailand without any fans.

==== 1988 Seoul Olympics ====
The years leading up to, during, and after the 1988 Seoul Olympics played a major role in the development of North Korea. In 1981, Seoul was selected as the host of the 1988 Olympics. Although at first, North Korea did not consider that Seoul being selected as Olympic host was a major issue, it quickly realized that South Korea hosting the Olympics would highlight the growing economic imbalances between North and South Korea. This realization led to a large devotion of time and effort in an attempt to convince the International Olympic Committee to split the Olympic Games between Seoul and Pyongyang. During these discussions, the IOC considered some concessions, only to be rejected by the North Korean regime. This can be seen as a great missed opportunity for North Korea to gain from the Olympic Games.

During this time, North Korea's major allies were China, the USSR, and Cuba. While Fidel Castro and Cuba staunchly defended North Korea, both the USSR and China agreed to participate in the games. This major decision strained relationships that were vital to the North Korean economic system. Throughout the history of North Korea, North Korea relied heavily on the foreign aid. The countries that gave the most aid were the USSR and China. For that reason, the strained relationships had a major effect on North Korea. This played a major role in the North Korean isolationist policies of the 1990s. In addition, as a result of the success of the Seoul Games, the growing gap between these two nations was further put on display.

As a result of the failed negotiations North Korea engaged in several acts of terrorism. In 1987, in an attempt to destabilize the Olympic Games and instill fear in the international community, a South Korean commercial flight, Korean Air Flight 858 was bombed killing 115 passengers on board. This event did not fulfill its intended purpose and instead further weakened North Korea's international reputation.

==== 13th World Festival of Youth and Students ====
North Korea, following its unsuccessful effort to sabotage the Seoul Olympics decided to hold the 13th World Festival of Youth and Students in 1989. Coming one year after the most successful Olympics in years, there was large pressure on the North Korean regime to hold a similarly successful event. Although this event brought in 177 countries, the greatest number in its history, it was never seen as a true alternative to the Olympics and did not gain the international visibility that the North Korean government had hoped for. In addition, the cost of the event was 4 billion dollars and helped push North Korea further into the financial distress that was prevalent during the 1990s.

==== Pyongyang International Sports and Culture Festival for Peace ====
Japanese wrestler-turned-politician Antonio Inoki worked with the North Korean government to organize the Pyongyang International Sports and Culture Festival for Peace in April 1995 in order to promote peace between North Korea, the United States and Japan. The Festival culminated in two nights of professional wrestling, which featured bouts between Japanese and American wrestlers that were watched by guest of honor Muhammad Ali. Several of the bouts were broadcast on pay-per-view in the US under the title 'Collision in Korea'.

==== Arirang Festival ====
The Arirang Festival, starting in the early 2000s takes place in the Rungrado 1st of May Stadium, the largest stadium in the world holding approximately 150,000 people. Participation in this event is mandatory and the performances are extravagant and impressively choreographed. The Arirang Festival can be broken up into three different parts. The first is a floor show, where thousands of athletes, gymnasts and dancers demonstrate their athletic abilities. The second section uses thousands of North Koreans to create a human mosaic depicting vibrant images of North Korea and North Korean achievements. Finally, the third section is the music that links the performance. Together, these elements present to the international community North Korea's best athletes through a mix of athletics and art. Many of the acts in the festival focus on the theme of reunification. Children chant "how much longer do we have to be divided due to foreign forces". The 2014 and 2015 Arirang Festivals were canceled.

==== Recent relations with South Korea ====
North Korea and South Korea marched together for the 2000 Sydney Olympics, 2004 Athens Olympics and 2006 Turin Olympics. Plans to walk together for the 2008 Beijing Olympics fell through when principles regarding selection of athletes could not be agreed upon. After the 2008 Beijing Olympics tensions have increased between these two nations.

Many inter-Korean sporting events were held in the 2000s. These events were referred to as unification matches.

==== Internal use of sports politics ====
The North Korean leaders understood the importance of sports not only in the international community, but also internally. The major ideology in North Korea, Juche, has been solidified through the Communist Party's use of sports. The North Korea regime believed that by supporting the increases in sport, the North Korean people would overall be more fit. This would allow the people to be more useful in the revolutionary struggle. For this reason, it was important to start athletics young. Training in physical sport was mandatory during schooling. In the 2000s, major sporting events were being broadcast throughout North Korea, and these events are still being used as propaganda tools. Sports have played a vital role in maintaining the power of the ruling class, while at the same time offering opportunities to interact with the international community.

=== Others ===
More recently Manny Pacquiao was elected to the House of Representatives of the Philippines in 2010 and Vitali Klitschko was elected to the Ukrainian Parliament as leader of the Ukrainian Democratic Alliance for Reform in 2012.

Serzh Sargsyan, the previous President of Armenia, is also Chairman of the Armenian Chess Federation. Olympic Champion Yurik Vardanyan is an advisor to Sargsyan.

Red Kelly became a Canadian MP while playing for the Toronto Maple Leafs.

Former cricketer Navjot Singh Sidhu ran three successful campaigns (including a by-election resulting from his own resignation) to become a member of parliament in the Lok Sabha as a Bharatiya Janata Party candidate. In the 2009 general election, former captain Mohammed Azharuddin also won a seat in parliament from outside his home territory. Kirti Azad also won a seat in parliament from Darbhanga, Bihar from the BJP. Sachin Tendulkar was sworn in as an MP in the Rajya Sabha on 4 June 2012, while he was active in the sports field. Olympic silver-medalist Rajyavardhan Singh Rathore joined the BJP. It was said that "celebrities...are a time-tested tool for the political parties to tide over their bankruptcy." Additionally, former cricketer Mohammed Kaif ran as an unsuccessful candidate for the National Congress in the 2014 elections. Former football player Avertano Furtado was also elected as a MLA in Goa. Former hockey player Pargat Singh was also elected as a MLA for the Shiromani Akali Dal.

In 2013, Wesley Korir, winner of the 2012 Boston Marathon, was elected to the Kenyan National Assembly.

Former chess player Garry Kasparov also became an opposition activist in his native Russia.

Former offshore powerboat racer Daniel Scioli became vice-president of Argentina between 2003 and 2007 and is currently the Governor of the Province of Buenos Aires, considered one of the most influential political jobs in Argentina. Carlos Espínola, a windsurfer and Olympic medalist, also entered politics and is, as of 2013, mayor of his native city in Corrientes Province. Former Pakistani cricketer and the captain of the Pakistan cricket team which won the world cup, Imran Khan later created his own political party PTI which is currently the main form of opposition in the Pakistan government.

Some Formula One drivers has been involved in politics after their retirement. Former Japanese driver Sakon Yamamoto was elected as a Member of the Japanese House of Representatives representing Liberal Democratic Party. Former Argentine driver Carlos Reutemann served as Governor of Santa Fe and senator representing Justicialist Party

== Colonial won victories ==
Some victories are considered retroactively to be belonging rather to ex-colonies rather than countries under which players fought under. Retroactive decisions are commonplace in sports, no matter it is for cheating, doping or other sanctioned behaviours.

== In popular culture ==
=== Films ===
- Invictus
- Escape to Victory
- Egaro
- Lagaan
- Ali
- Miracle (2004 film)
- Going Vertical

== See also ==
- List of sportsperson-politicians
- List of sporting scandals
- Sociology of sport
- Sport sanctions
- Sportswashing
- Stick to sports
