= Cricket test =

Controversial phrase coined in 1990

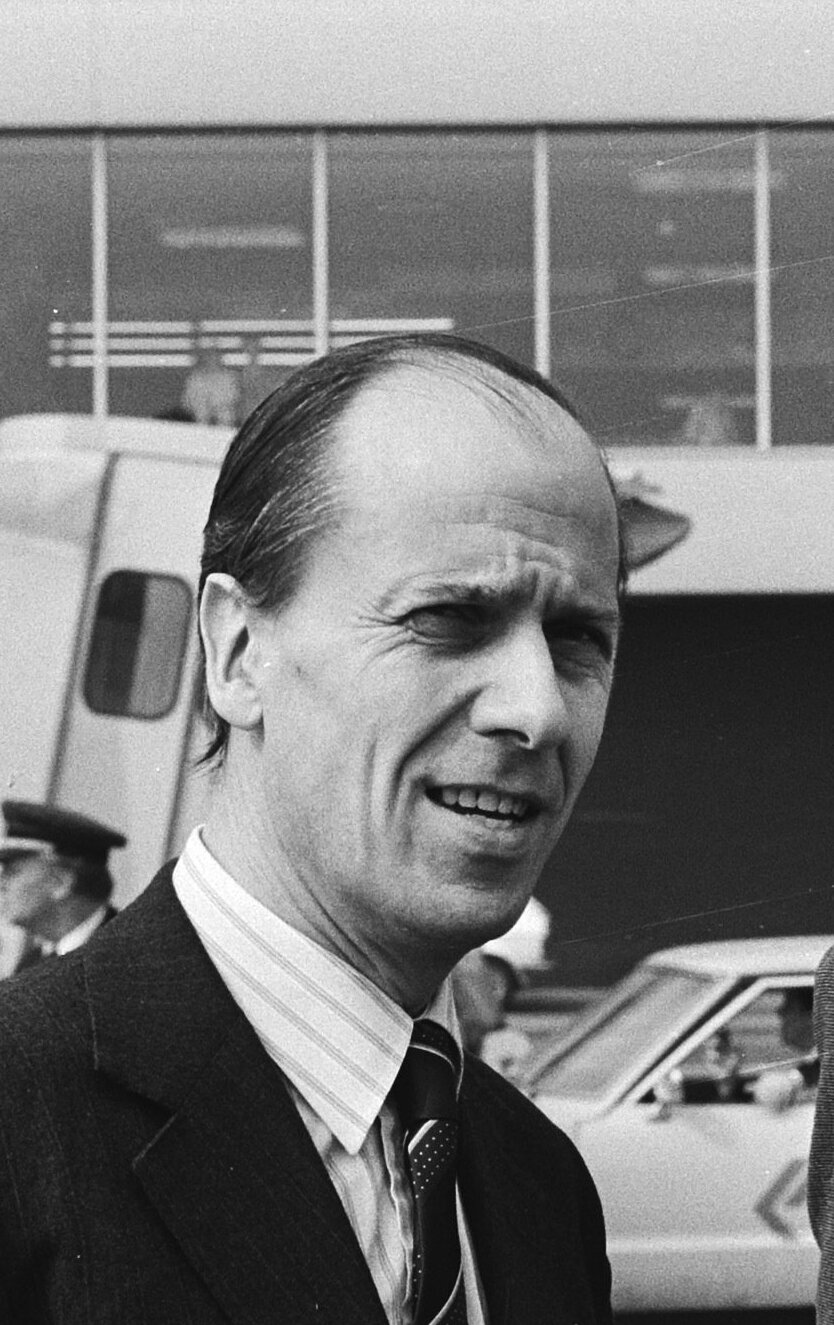
Tebbit in 1981

The cricket test, also known as the Tebbit test, was a sociological concept coined in April 1990 by the British Conservative politician Norman Tebbit in reference to the perceived lack of loyalty to the England cricket team among South Asian and Caribbean immigrants and their children. Tebbit suggested that those immigrants who support their native countries rather than England at the sport of cricket are not significantly integrated into the United Kingdom.

== Background ==
Post-war Britain experienced mass migration from the cricket playing countries of the West Indies and South Asia. Ever since, the issue of assimilation and multiculturalism has been a controversial issue in British politics.

In an interview with the Los Angeles Times, Tebbit said: "A large proportion of Britain's Asian population fail to pass the cricket test. Which side do they cheer for? It's an interesting test. Are you still harking back to where you came from or where you are?"

Tebbit told Woodrow Wyatt in 1991 that he did not think certain immigrant communities would assimilate "because some of them insist on sticking to their own culture, like the Muslims in Bradford and so forth, and they are extremely dangerous."

== Legacy ==
The phrase "cricket test" and the associated loyalty concepts received a lot of media attention for many months after Tebbit's statement, and have been widely discussed and argued over ever since. Rather than staying culturally separate, immigrants from the Windrush generation said they used cricket to overcome racism, gain acceptance and integrate into British society.

Lord Tebbit later claimed that his test could have prevented the 7 July 2005 London bombings. His remarks were decried by some Indian media outlets as "ignorant and outdated".

In August 2018, Tebbit himself said that the test was no longer necessary. "The Tebbit Test is immaterial now," he told The Indian Express. "If I were in charge of cricket, football or athletics in the country, I would be choosing British-Asians, Blacks and people from Ethiopia. I cheer for them. The race isn't an issue like it used to be. The time to talk stuff like ‘whether it’s in the blood’ is gone now. It has gradually washed away. Assimilation has already occurred. The more non-ethnic English get into the English cricket team, the more it will become obvious that the door is open to full integration."

== See also ==
- British national identity
- Cultural assimilation
- Politics and sports
