= Vitali Smirnov =

Russian IOC member

- Виталий Смирнов
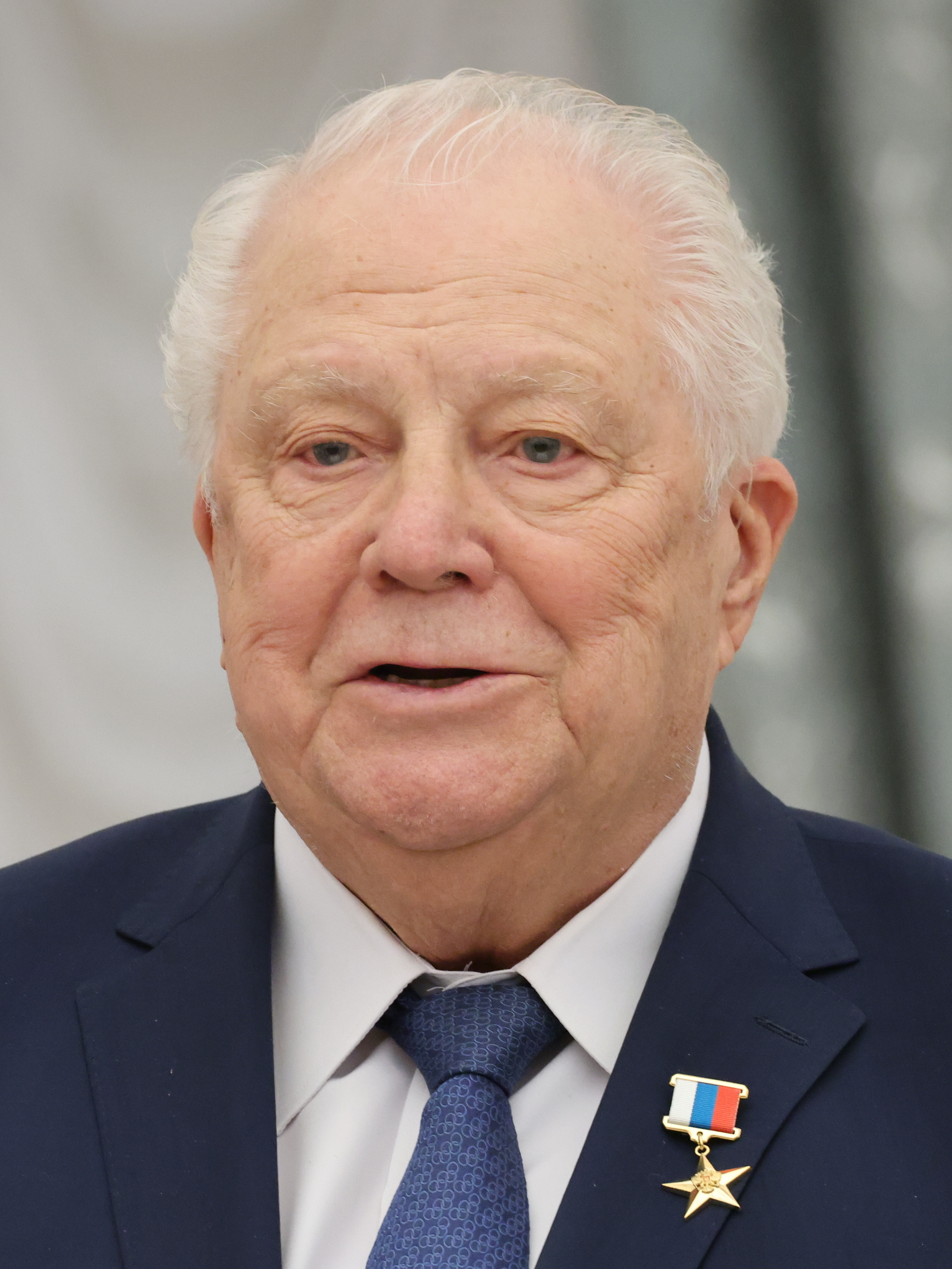
- Smirnov at the Kremlin in 2025

President of the Russian Olympic Committee
- In office 1992–2001
- Preceded by: Committee established
- Succeeded by: Leonid Tyagachyov

President of the Soviet Olympic Committee
- In office 1990–1992
- Preceded by: Marat Gramov
- Succeeded by: Position dissolved

Personal details
- Born: 14 February 1935 (age 91) Khabarovsk, Russian SFSR, Soviet Union
- Education: Moscow School for the Social and Economic Sciences

Vitali Georgiyevich Smirnov (Russian: Виталий Георгиевич Смирнов; born 14 February 1935) is a former athlete from the Soviet Union (Russian Far East) and longtime sports administrator.

He was active in swimming, water polo, tennis, and boxing, and he was a member of the USSR Masters' water polo team. Smirnov has published various articles on physical education, sport and Olympic issues. With 44-years of service in the International Olympic Committee (IOC), Vitali Smirnov is the second-longest serving member in the organization's history.

== Education ==
Smirnov studied at the Academy of Physical Education and Sport, as well as at the University of Social Sciences in Moscow (Russian Federation).

== Career ==
From 1970 to 1975 he was the First Vice-Minister of Sport of the USSR, and from 1981 to 1990, he was the Minister of Sport of the Russian Federation. He also had various other obligations throughout the years in sport and physical education organizations.

=== Sports administration ===
Vitali Smirnov was Executive President of the Organising Committee of the Games of the XXII Olympiad in Moscow in 1980 from 1975 until 1981. Then he was President of the USSR National Olympic Committee from 1990 to 1992. At the Russian National Olympic Committee he was President from 1992 to 2001, then Honorary President starting in 2001. He was a board member of the International Olympic Truce Foundation (IOTF) as of 2012. Smirnov joined the IOC in 1971, becoming an IOC member, and was active in various commissions, serving in various capacities until 2015. He was a Member of the Executive Board from 1974 to 1978, the again from 1986 to 1990. He was in the position of Vice-President three different times, 1978 to 1982, 1990 to 1994, and 2001 to 2005. He was Chairman of the Eligibility Commission from 1992 to 1998. From 1972 to 1978, he was member of the Olympic Program commission, then he was Chair from 1983 to 1991. From 1973 to 1975, he was member of the Olympic Solidarity commission, then 1979 to 1982 member of the Tripartite commission. Smirnov was a member of the Council of the Olympic Order from 1978 to 1982, 1991 to 1995, and again from 2003 to 2004. From 1992 to 1994, he was a part of the preparation of the XII Olympic Congress – Congress of Unity. He was a member of the International Relations commission from 2002 to 2015, then in 2002 he was part of the IOC 2000 Reform Follow-Up. From 2004 to 2005, he was member of the Remuneration Working Group. From 2006 to 2009, Smirnov was a member of the 2009 Congress, and from 2015 to 2016, he was a member of the Public Affairs and Social Development through Sport commission. Vitali Smirnov was appointed to oversee the Russian Anti-Doping Commission in 2016.

== Awards and honors ==
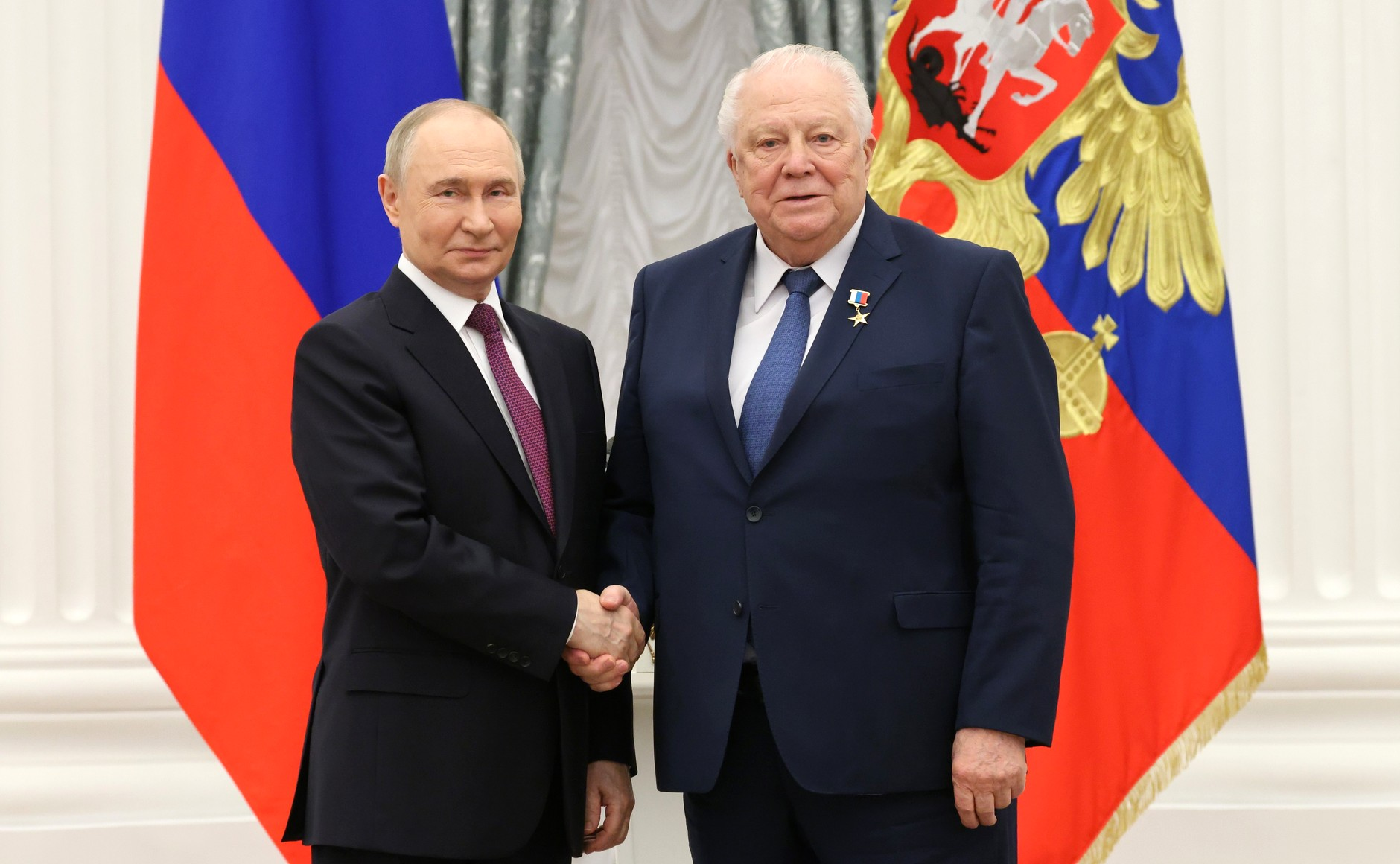
Presentation of the star of Hero of Labour of the Russian Federation, May 22, 2025

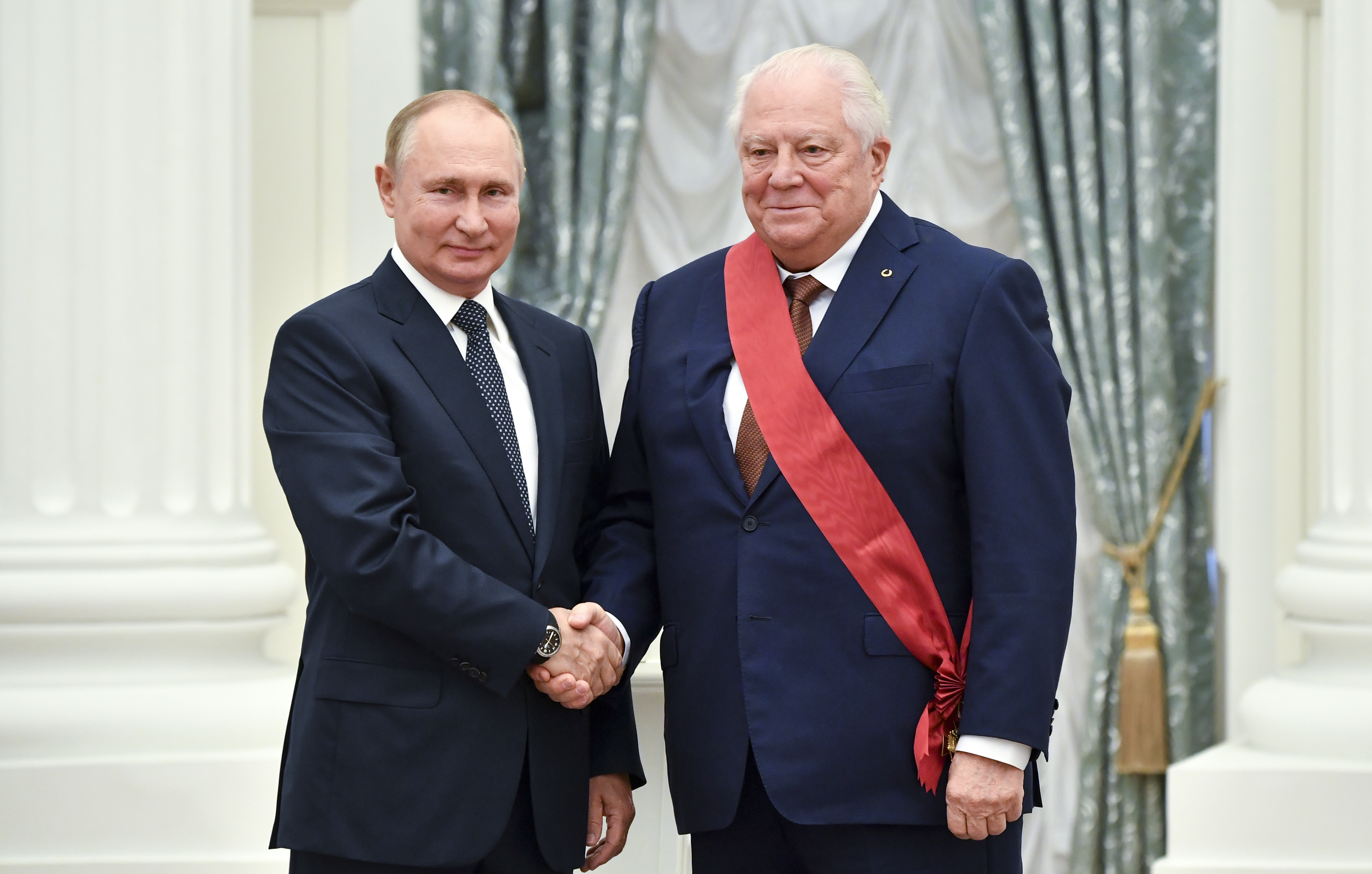
Presentation of the Order "For Merit to the Fatherland" 1st class, September 11, 2021

- Hero of Labour of the Russian Federation (1 February 2025) – for special service to the development of national sport and Olympic movement
- Order "For Merit to the Fatherland";
  - 1st class (30 January 2020) – for outstanding service to the development of sport and Olympic movement
  - 2nd class (19 April 2001) – for great contribution to the development of physical culture and sport, high achievements of Russian athletes in sports at the Games of the XXVII Olympiad in Sydney in 2000
  - 3rd class (26 August 1996) – for services to the state and great personal contribution to the development of national sport
  - 4th class (22 April 2010) – for great services to the development of national sport and public activities
- Order of Alexander Nevsky (2015)
- Order of Honour (22 April 1994) – for high athletic achievement at the XVII Olympic Winter Games in 1994
- Order of the Red Banner of Labour (1985)
- Order of Friendship of Peoples (14 November 1980) – for the successful preparation of Soviet athletes and high athletic achievement at the Games of the XXII Olympiad in Moscow
- Three Orders of the Badge of Honour (1966, 1970 and 1976)
- Gratitude of the President of the Russian Federation (6 August 2007) – for active participation in efforts to ensure the victory of the application of Sochi to host the XXII Winter Olympic and XI Paralympic Winter Games in 2014
- Dostlug Order (12 February 2015)
- Olympic Order (2015)
- Jean Petitjean Medal from the International University Sports Federation (FISU)
