= Russian Olympic Committee =

- Country: Russia
- Code: RUS
- Created: 1911
- Recognized: 1911 (original); 1951 (USSR); 1992 (re-structured)
- Continental Association: EOC
- Headquarters: Moscow, Russia
- President: Mikhail Degtyarev
- Secretary General: Vacant
- Website: en.olympic.ru

The Russian Olympic Committee (ROC; IOC Code: RUS) (Note: Russian: Олимпийский комитет России (ОКР), romanized: Olimpiyskiy komitet Rossii (OKR); Full name: All-Russian united social union "Olympic Committee of Russia", Russian: Общероссийский союз общественных объединений «Олимпийский комитет России», romanized: Obshcherossiyskiy soyuz obshchestvennykh ob"yedineniy «Olimpiyskiy komitet Rossii») is the National Olympic Committee representing Russia. Established in 1911 and later subsumed by the Soviet Olympic Committee, the ROC was restructured in 1992 following the collapse of the Soviet Union. Since 2009, the ROC has faced frequent accusations of cheating, resulting in 51 Olympic medals being stripped, and in 2019 was suspended by the International Olympic Committee (IOC) for its extensive state-sponsored doping program. The ROC faced further sanctions following the invasion of Ukraine. In July 2026, the IOC announced its intention to allow the ROC to compete in subsequent Olympic Games.

== History ==
Russia's Olympic Committee was founded in 1911 by representatives of Russian Sports Societies at a meeting in Saint Petersburg, in the premises of the Imperial Russian Society for Saving on the Water (Sadovaya Street 50), when the Statute was adopted and members of the committee were elected.

The first chairman of the Russian Olympic Committee was Vyacheslav Sreznevsky.

In 1950–1992, the Russian Olympic Committee was essentially the Soviet Olympic Committee, based in Moscow.

By decision of the Constituent Assembly on 1 December 1989, the All-Russian Olympic Committee was established as an independent public organization within the Soviet Olympic Committee. On 13 August 1992, it was officially named the Russian Olympic Committee (ROC). Full and final recognition of the ROC as the legal successor of the Soviet Olympic Committee by the International Olympic Committee (IOC) was received at the 101st Session of the IOC in September 1992.

=== 2017–2019 ===
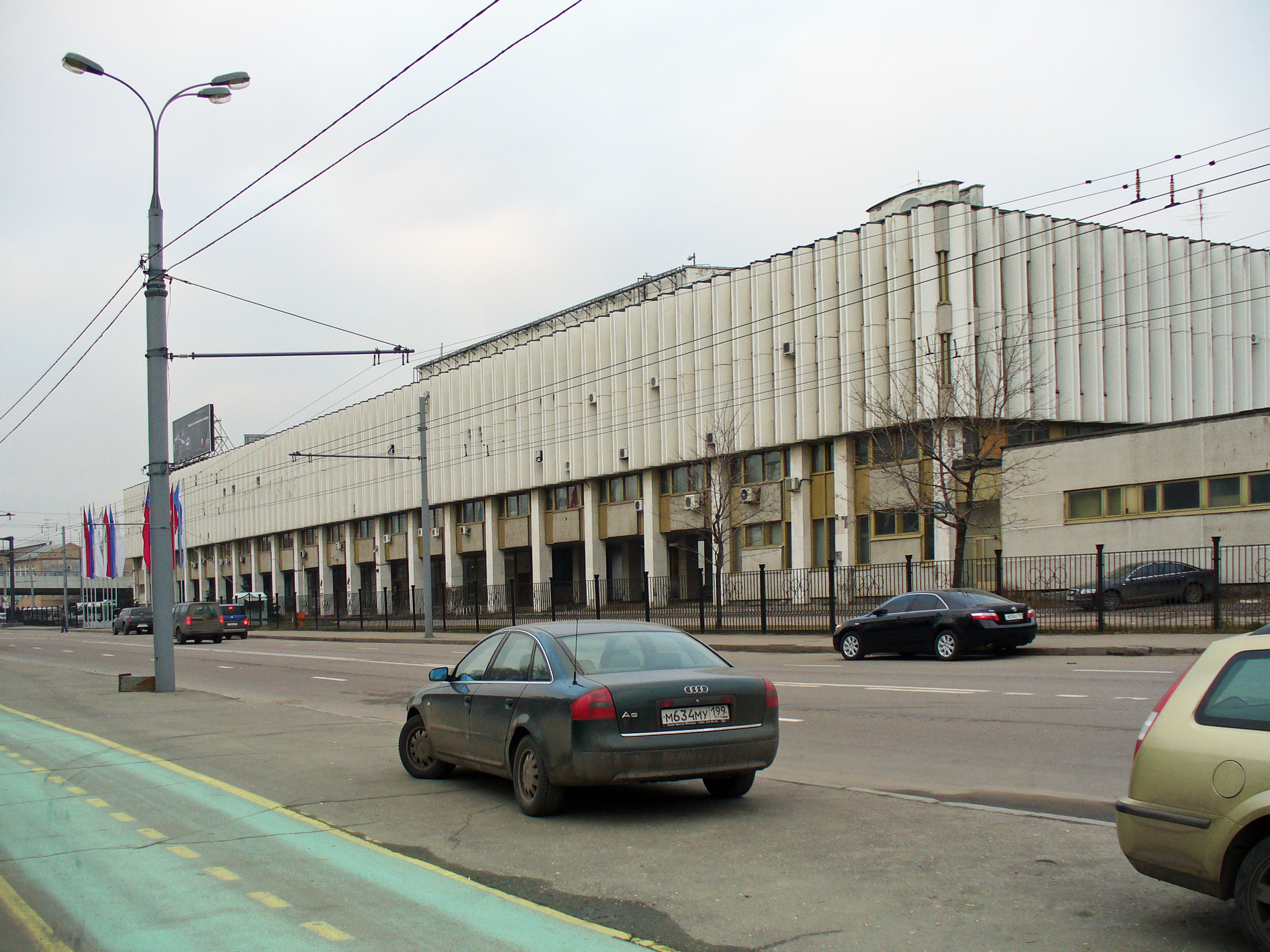
Headquarters of the ROC in Moscow; it was formerly the headquarters of the Soviet Olympic Committee.

On 5 December 2017, the Russian Olympic Committee was suspended by the IOC over its participation in a state-sponsored doping program. It was banned from the 2018 Winter Olympics in Pyeongchang and ordered to pay $15 million in costs for doping offenses which IOC president Thomas Bach called an "unprecedented attack on the integrity of the Olympic Games and sport".

On 28 February 2018, following completion of doping test checks for Russian athletes who participated in the 2018 Winter Olympics, the IOC reinstated the Russian Olympic Committee, despite two failed drug tests.

Since he was elected in May 2018, as Vladimir Putin's choice, former fencer Stanislav Pozdnyakov has served as the President of the Russian Olympic Committee. He was re-elected in 2022 and 2024.

On 9 December 2019, the World Anti-Doping Agency (WADA) banned Russia from all international sport for four years after it found that data provided by the Russian Anti-Doping Agency had been manipulated by Russian authorities with a goal of protecting athletes involved in its state-sponsored doping scheme. Russia filed an appeal to the Court of Arbitration for Sport (CAS) against the WADA decision. The Court of Arbitration for Sport, on review of Russia's appeal of its case from WADA, ruled on 17 December 2020 to reduce the penalty that WADA had placed. Instead of banning Russia from sporting events, the ruling allowed Russia to participate at the Olympics and other international events, but for a period of two years, the team was not allowed to use the Russian name, flag, or anthem and must present themselves as "Neutral Athlete" or "Neutral Team". The ruling did allow for team uniforms to display "Russia" on the uniform, as well as the use of the Russian flag colors within the uniform's design, although the name should be up to equal predominance as the "Neutral Athlete/Team" designation.

=== 2020–2025 ===
On 19 February 2021, the IOC announced that Russia would compete under the acronym "ROC", after the name of the Russian Olympic Committee. It would be disallowed to use team uniforms bearing the words "Russian Olympic Committee" or any mention of the word "Russian". The Russian national flag would be substituted by the flag of the Russian Olympic Committee.

On 15 April 2021, the uniforms for the Russian Olympic Committee athletes were unveiled, featuring the colours of the Russian flag. On 22 April 2021, the replacement for Russia's anthem was approved by the IOC, after an earlier choice of the patriotic Russian war song "Katyusha" was rejected. A fragment of Pyotr Tchaikovsky's Piano Concerto No. 1 was used.

In September 2022, ROC president Stanislav Pozdnyakov urged Russian athletes to fight for Russia in its invasion of Ukraine, saying the athletes should feel honored to do so. He said: "From the point of view of the Russian Olympic Committee, we, being citizens of the country, consider service to the motherland is an honourable duty and an honourable duty of every citizen, including members of national teams." That month, Olympic synchronised swimming champion Anastasia Davydova quit her job as ROC secretary general in protest of the invasion, and fled to Dubai. In April 2023, Pozdnyakov expressed surprise that there was talk of Russian athletes losing motivation during their continued ineligibility to compete in major international events, as a result of the invasion.

On 12 October 2023, the IOC issued a statement noting that after Russia began its full-scale invasion of Ukraine in 2022, the ROC unilaterally transferred four regions that were originally under the jurisdiction of the National Olympic Committee of Ukraine: Donetsk Oblast, Luhansk Oblast, Kherson Oblast, and Zaporizhzhia Oblast to the ROC; at the time, Pozdnyakov said "I don't see any difficulties here." The IOC stated that the ROC's unilateral action constituted a breach of the Olympic Charter because it violated the territorial integrity of the NOC of Ukraine, and further announced the immediate suspension of the membership of the ROC. The IOC stated that as a result the ROC was no longer entitled to operate as a National Olympic Committee as defined in the Olympic Charter, and could not receive any funding from the Olympic Movement, and that as stated in the IOC's position and recommendations of 28 March 2023, the IOC reserved the right to decide about the participation of individual neutral athletes with a Russian passport in the Olympic Games Paris 2024. On 13 December 2024, Minister of Sport Mikhail Degtyarev was elected as the new president of ROC. On 10 December 2025, the position of the head of the ROC was renamed from president to chairman.

In 2025, under the leadership of Kirsty Coventry, the International Olympic Committee (IOC) began signaling a shift towards inclusivity by considering the return of Russia to the Olympic Games. Despite the conflict between Russia and Ukraine, Coventry expressed openness to revisiting Russia's participation.

=== 2026–present ===
The IOC ban on the Russian Olympic Committee was provisionally lifted on 7 July 2026, coinciding with the start of the qualification period for the 2028 Summer Olympics and the 2028 Winter Youth Olympics, with the IOC and Coventry citing that the ROC no longer controlled sporting bodies in occupied Ukrainian territory and that athletes should not be responsible for their government's actions. As part of the decision, the IOC remained undecided on the use of Russia's flag, colours, and anthem, but insisted that Russian athletes may compete upon meeting relevant anti-doping requirements. The IOC also upheld its stance of not hosting events in the country. ROC chairman Mikhail Degtyarev welcomed the decision, while the Ministry of Foreign Affairs of Ukraine called it "troubling" and urged other countries to maintain bans on Russian athletes and Russian state symbols. Lisa Nandy, the culture secretary for the United Kingdom, also denounced the IOC's ruling, expressing solidarity with Ukraine and admonishing Russia's previous "flagrant disregard for anti-doping regulations".

== Presidents ==
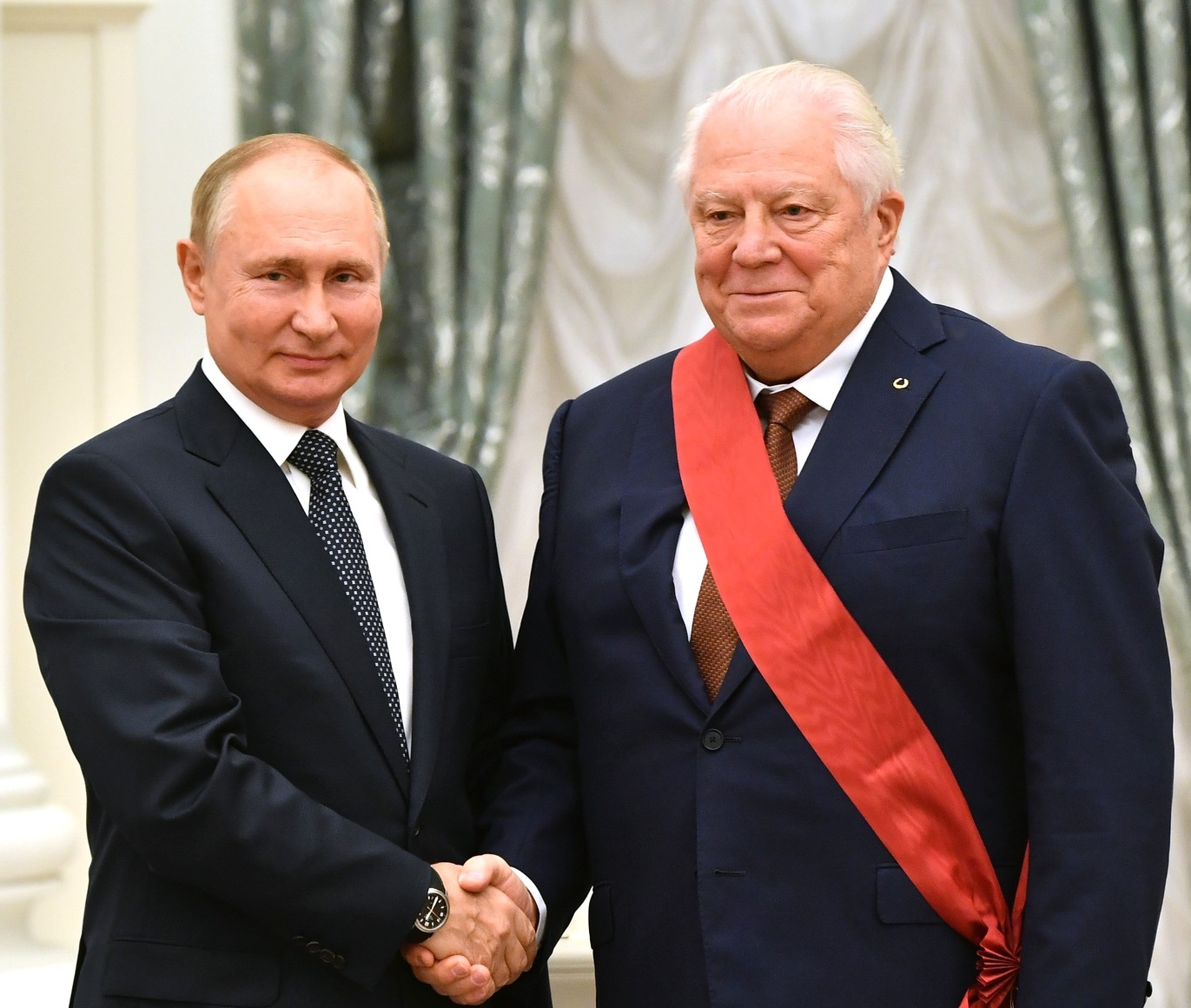
Vladimir Putin and Soviet and Russian Olympic Committee president Vitali Smirnov, 2021

Presidents	Term years
Vyacheslav Sreznevsky (Chairman)	1911–1918
Vitali Smirnov	1992–2001
Leonid Tyagachev	2001–2010
Alexander Zhukov	2010–2018
Stanislav Pozdnyakov	2018–2024
Mikhail Degtyarev	2024–present

== IOC members ==
Member	Term years
Vitali Smirnov	1992–2015
Alexander Popov	2000–2016
Alexander Zhukov	2013–2018
Shamil Tarpischev	1994–present
Yelena Isinbayeva	2016–2024

== Member federations ==
Russian National Federations were the organizations that coordinated all aspects of their individual sports. They were responsible for training, competition, and development of their sports. They were 37 Summer Olympic and 12 Winter Olympic sport federations in Russia, all headquartered in Moscow.

National Federation	Summer or Winter
Russian Alpine Ski and Snowboard Federation	Winter
Russian Archery Federation	Summer
All-Russia Athletic Federation	Summer
National Badminton Federation of Russia	Summer
Russian Baseball Federation	Summer
Russian Basketball Federation	Summer
Russian Biathlon Union	Winter
Bobsleigh Federation of Russia	Winter
Boxing Federation of Russia	Summer
Russian Canoe Federation	Summer
Climbing Federation of Russia	Summer
Cross-Country Skiing Federation of Russia	Winter
Russian Curling Federation	Winter
Russian Cycling Federation	Summer
All Russian Federation of DanceSport and Acrobatic Rock'n'Roll	Summer
Russian Diving Federation	Summer
Russian Equestrian federation	Summer
Russian Fencing Federation	Summer
Russian Field Hockey Federation	Summer
Figure Skating Federation of Russia	Winter
Football Union of Russia	Summer
Freestyle Federation of Russia	Winter
Artistic Gymnastics Federation of Russia	Summer
Russian Rhythmic Gymnastics Federation	Summer
Russian Golf Association	Summer
Handball Federation of Russia	Summer
Ice Hockey Federation of Russia	Winter
Russian Judo Federation	Summer
Russian Karate Federation	Summer
Russian Luge Federation	Winter
Russian Modern Pentathlon Federation	Summer
Russian Rowing Federation	Summer
Rugby Union of Russia	Summer
Shooting Union of Russia	Summer
Russian Skating Union	Winter
Russian Ski Association	Winter
Russian Ski Jumping and Nordic Combined Federation	Winter
Russian Softball Federation	Summer
Russian Swimming Federation	Summer
Table Tennis Federation of Russia	Summer
Russian Taekwondo Federation	Summer
Russian Tennis Federation	Summer
Russian Trampoline Federation	Summer
Russian Triathlon Federation	Summer
All-Russian Volleyball Federation	Summer
Russian Water Polo Federation	Summer
Russian Weightlifting Federation	Summer
Russian Whitewater Slalom Federation	Summer
Russian Wrestling Federation	Summer
Russian Yachting Federation	Summer

== See also ==
- Doping in Russia
- Russia at the Olympics
  - Russian Olympic Committee athletes at the 2020 Summer Olympics
  - Russian Olympic Committee athletes at the 2022 Winter Olympics
- Russian Paralympic Committee
- Russian Paralympic Committee athletes at the 2020 Summer Paralympics
- Russian Paralympic Committee athletes at the 2022 Winter Paralympics
- Russian Ministry of Sport
- Sochi 2014 Olympic and Paralympic Organizing Committee
- Soviet Olympic Committee
