= Vyacheslav Sreznevsky =

Russian philologist, photographer and sports executive

- Вячеслав Срезневский
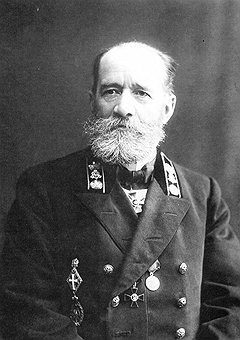
- Sreznevsky in 1915
- Born: 3 October [O.S. 21 September] 1849; Saint Petersburg, Russian Empire
- Died: 29 June 1937 (aged 87); Leningrad, Soviet Union
- Father: Izmail Sreznevsky

Vyacheslav Izmailovich Sreznevsky (Russian: Вячеслав Измайлович Срезневский; 3 October 1849 – 29 June 1937) was a Russian philologist, photographer and sports executive. He served as Chairman of the Russian Olympic Committee (1911–1918), founder and chairman of the Saint Petersburg Society of Ice Skating Amateurs (1877–1923).

== Biography ==
Vyacheslav Sreznevsky was born in 1849 in Saint Petersburg to a family of a philologist Izmail Ivanovich Sreznevsky (1812–1880) and his wife Yelizaveta Fyodorovna, née Tyurina, a daughter of a maths teacher from Kharkiv. Vyacheslav had three brothers and four sisters.

In 1870 Sreznevsky graduated from the Faculty of History and Philology of Saint Petersburg Imperial University. In 1878–81, he lectured there on the Russian language history and Church Slavonic grammar. He was also a teacher of Russian language and literature in the St. Petersburg 2nd realschule and the Imperial Alexander Lyceum.

Sreznevsky was an amateur photographer from a young age. In 1882 he invented a special weather-resistant camera for Nikolay Przhevalsky's expeditions to Central Asia. Since 1878, Sreznevsky took an active part in the Russian Technical Society: he was the founder of its photographic department, and led it until 1916. From June 1880, he was the editor of the Photograph magazine. In 1881–84 Sreznevsky published the first Russian reference book on photography.

Sreznevsky contributed to the development of bandy, speed skating and other sports in Russia. On 16 March 1911 he was elected the first chairman of the Russian Olympic Committee. He helped organize the 1896 and 1903 World Figure Skating Championships in Saint Petersburg, as well as the 1913 European Speed Skating Championships.

After the October Revolution of 1917, Sreznevsky took part in Vsevobuch. He became one of the founders and teachers of the Higher Institute of Photography and Phototechnics (now the Saint Petersburg State Institute of Film and Television). He died in Leningrad at the age of 87, and was buried at the Smolensky Cemetery.
