= Russian Ski Association =

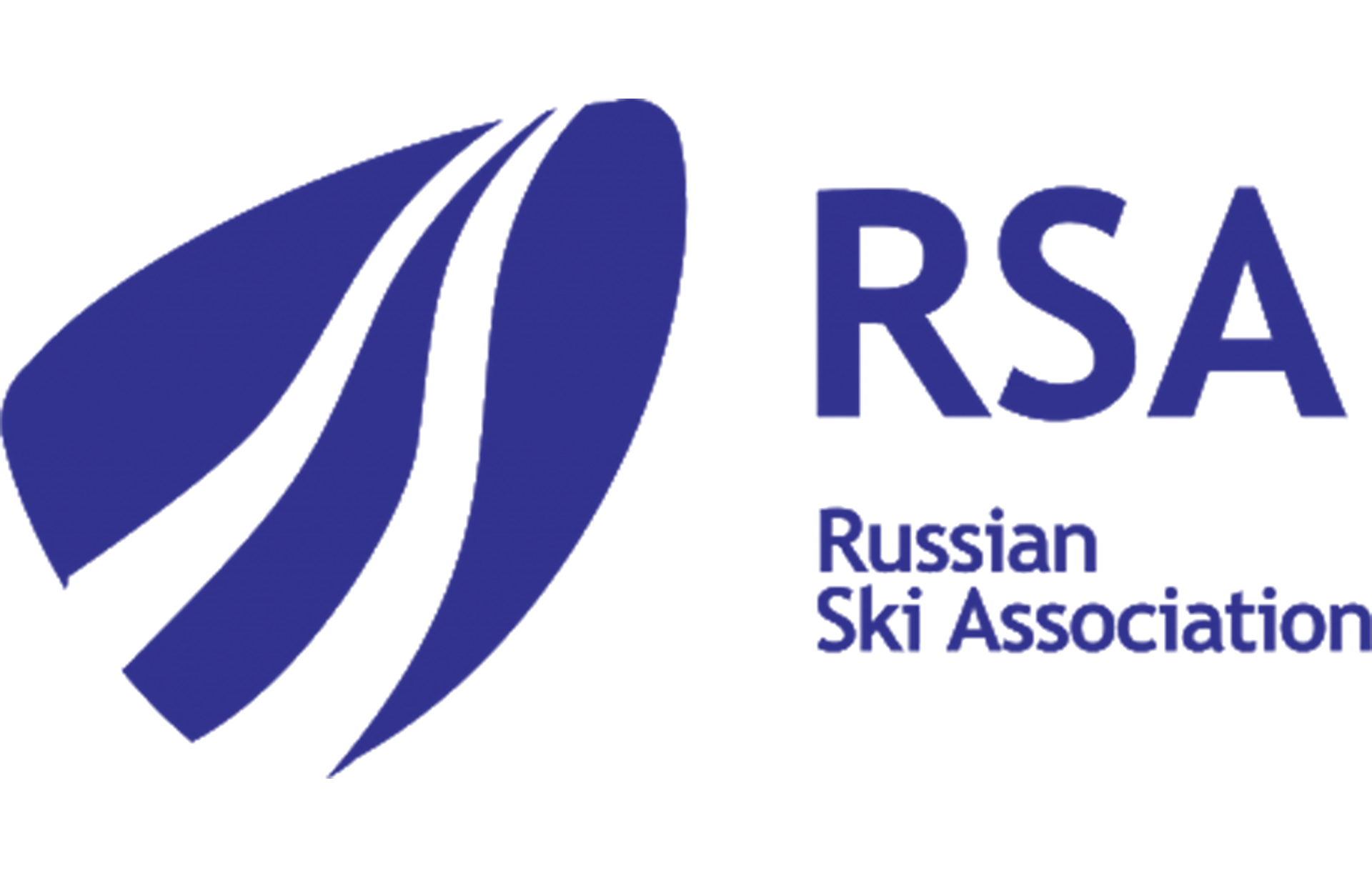
RSA Team flag

The Russian Ski Association (RSA) is a non-governmental organization, which represents Russian ski sports in the international field. Organization includes four all-Russian sports Federations: Russian Alpine Skiing and Snowboard Federation, Cross-Country Ski Federation of Russia, Freestyle Federation of Russia, Ski Jumping and Nordic Combined Federation of Russia. Members of the Russian Ski Association are represented in the International Ski and Snowboard Federation (FIS). In response to the 2022 Russian invasion of Ukraine, in March 2022 Russian athletes were suspended from participating in FIS competitions.

== History ==
The Russian Ski Association who is a creator of an RSA was founded in 2005 on the basis of The Russian Ski Union. The Russian Ski Union was founded in 1994 and it had combined the Cross-Country Ski Federation of Russia, the Nordic Combined and Ski Jumping Federation of Russia, the Freestyle Federation of Russia, the Alpine Skiing and Snowboard Federation of Russia.

In 2003, the Russian Government gave a direction to public organizations of Russia to re-register. But The Russian Ski Union was able to be re-registered only under conditions that the four federations had already been re-registered. Some federations were late with this procedure so the Russian Ski Union wasn't re-registered either. The Union existed until 2005, actively representing the Russian Federation on the international field. In 2005, the decision was made to recreate the Union. Its new name was more relevant for the International Ski Association. The Russian Ski Association is recognized by the Russian Olympic Committee (ROC) and included in the register of Russian public organizations.

In response to the 2022 Russian invasion of Ukraine, in March 2022 Russian athletes were suspended from participating in FIS competitions.
