= Konstantin Andrianov =

Russian sports administrator

Personal information
- Nationality: Soviet
- Born: 16 February 1910 Moscow, Russian Empire
- Died: 18 January 1988 (aged 77) Moscow, Russian SFSR, Soviet Union

Konstantin Andrianov (16 February 1910 – 18 January 1988) was a Russian sports administrator who was the first president of the Soviet Olympic Committee and a vice-president of the International Olympic Committee. In 1988, he was a recipient of the Silver Olympic Order.
