= Soviet Olympic Committee =

1951–1992 Soviet organization

NOC USSR
- Country: Soviet Union
- Code: URS
- Created: April 23, 1951
- Recognized: May 7, 1951
- Continental Association: EOC
- Dissolved: March 12, 1992
- Headquarters: Moscow

The National Olympic Committee of the Union of Soviet Socialist Republics (Russian: Национальный Олимпийский комитет Союза Советских Социалистических Республик – НОК СССР) was the government-funded organization representing the Soviet Union in the International Olympic Committee. The NOC USSR organized Soviet participation at the Summer and Winter Olympic Games. The International Olympic Committee recognized the NOC USSR on 7 May 1951 at the 45th session of the IOC. Prior to the 1950s, the Soviet Union refused to participate in the Olympics on ideological grounds.

== Presidents ==
Presidents	Term years
Konstantin Andrianov	1951–1977
Sergei Pavlov	1977–1983
Marat Gramov	1983–1990
Vitali Smirnov	1990–1992 (continued for Russia until 2001)

== Soviet members of the International Olympic Committee ==
Member	Term years
Konstantin Andrianov	1951–1988
Aleksei Osipowich Romanov	1952–1971
Vitali Smirnov	1971–1992 (continued for Russia until 2015)
Marat Gramov	1988–1992

== See also ==
- Soviet Union at the Olympics
- Russian Olympic Committee
- Spartakiad
