= Shooting Union of Russia =

Sports governing body in Russia

Shooting Union of Russia (Russian: Стрелковый союз России, romanized: Strelkovy soyuz Rossii) is the successor organisation of the Federation of Bullets and Shotguns of the USSR.

In its activities, the union is guided by the Charter, the Olympic Charter and the Charter of the International Shooting Sport Federation (International Shooting Sport Federation (ISSF)). The Russia Shooting Union is a member of the ISSF, the European Confederation of Sport Shooting Activities (ESC), and the International Federation of the shooting sports and hunting weapons (FITASC).

In March 2022, the Russian Sports Ministry suspended the state accreditation of the Russian Shooting Union.

After the 2022 Russian invasion of Ukraine, the ISSF banned Russian and Belarusian athletes and officials from its competitions.
