= Aleksey Medvedev (weightlifter) =

Soviet weightlifter (1927–2003)

Personal information
- Born: 9 October 1927 Moscow, Russian SFSR, USSR
- Died: 9 May 2003 (aged 75) Moscow, Russia
- Education: Russian State University of Physical Education, Sport, Youth and Tourism
- Weight: under 120 kg

Sport
- Sport: Weightlifting
Medal record
Representing the Soviet Union
World Weightlifting Championships
Gold medal – first place	1957 Tehran	+90 kg
Gold medal – first place	1958 Stockholm	+90 kg
European Weightlifting Championships
Gold medal – first place	1956 Helsinki	+90 kg
Gold medal – first place	1958 Stockholm	+90 kg

Alexey Sidorovich Medvedev (Russian: Алексей Сидорович Медведев; 9 October 1927 – 9 May 2003) was a Soviet-Russian heavyweight weightlifter who won European titles in 1956 and 1958 and world titles in 1957 and 1958. On 15 March 1959, he set a world record in the snatch.

Medvedev served as the Soviet flag bearer at the 1956 Summer Olympics. He was prevented from competing by Soviet authorities as they expected the flag bearer to win a gold medal and believed that Medvedev would not be able to do that.

During World War II Medvedev started working at a factory, aged 14. There he occasionally trained in cross-country skiing, athletics and football. He took up weightlifting in 1946, and in 1949, after placing second at the Soviet championships, was included to the national team. Later he became the first Soviet athlete to lift a total of 500 kg. Medvedev retired in 1962 to become the head coach of the Soviet national weightlifting team. He served as vice-president of the European (1969–1975) and International Weightlifting Federation (1969–1980), and in addition acted as a judge. From 1997 until his death he headed the weightlifting department of the Russian State University of Physical Education, Sport, Youth and Tourism, his alma mater.

Medvedev was married to Yelizaveta Medvedeva. They had a son Aleksandr (born 1952), who headed the Khrunichev State Research and Production Space Center.
