= Yakov Kutsenko =

Ukrainian weightlifter (1915–1988)

Yakiv Kutsenko

Personal information
- Born: Yakiv Hryhorovych Kutsenko; November 22, 1915 Kiev, Russian Empire
- Died: August 13, 1988 (aged 72) Kiev, Ukrainian SSR, Soviet Union
- Years active: 1940–1960

Sport
- Sport: Weightlifting
Medal record
Representing the Soviet Union
World Weightlifting Championships
Silver medal – second place	1946 Paris	Heavyweight
Silver medal – second place	1950 Paris	Heavyweight
European Weightlifting Championships
Gold medal – first place	1947 Helsinki	Heavyweight
Gold medal – first place	1950 Paris	Heavyweight

Yakiv Hryhorovych Kutsenko (Ukrainian: Яків Григорович Куценко, 22 November 1915 – 13 August 1988) was a Ukrainian heavyweight weightlifter. Between 1946 and 1950 he won two European titles and two silver medals at world championships, both times losing to John Davis. He was the Soviet heavyweight champion between 1937 and 1952, and in 1947 set three official world records in the clean and jerk.

Kutsenko served as the Soviet flag bearer at the 1952 Summer Olympics. He was prevented from competing by Soviet authorities who expected the flag bearer to win a gold medal and believed Kutsenko wouldn't be able to achieve that.
