= Denunciation =

Act of assigning blame

A "Lion's Mouth" postbox for anonymous denunciations at the Doge's Palace in Venice. Text translation: "Secret denunciations against anyone who will conceal favors and services or will collude to hide the true revenue from them".

Denunciation (from Latin denuntiare, "to denounce") is the act of publicly assigning to a person the blame for a perceived wrongdoing, with the hope of bringing attention to it. Notably, centralized social control in authoritarian states requires some level of cooperation from the populace. The following two forms of cooperation occur: first, authorities actively use incentives to elicit denunciations from the populace, either through coercion or through the promise of rewards. Second, authorities passively gain access to political negative networks, as individuals denounce to harm others whom they dislike and to gain relative to them. Paradoxically, social control is most effective when authorities provide individuals maximum freedom to direct its coercive power. The most famous informer in western cultural history is Judas - according to the New Testament, Judas, one of the twelve disciples of Jesus of Nazareth, betrayed Jesus, making his arrest and his subsequent delivery to the Romans possible.

Commonly, denunciation is justified by proponents because it allegedly leads to a better society by reducing or discouraging crime. The punishment of the denounced person is said to be justified because the convicted criminal is morally deserving of punishment. Yet, this reasoning does not present a compelling argument for society's right to inflict punishment on a specific individual. Society may recognize a crime's impact on law-abiding society, but traditional punishment theories do not even attempt to deal with punishment's effect on law-abiding society. Just as punishment may impact potential lawbreakers, it may also impact those who abide by the law. To fully understand society's right to inflict punishment, one must recognize punishment's full impact on all segments of society, not just on potential lawbreakers.

== History ==
Athenian democracy used the process of ostracism to allow popular anonymous denunciations.

However, a distinction must be made between denunciation and justified reporting. According to a common understanding, a person who, in order to avert dangers to the general public or a part of it, points out a grievance to offices, authorities or renowned media, does not classify as an informer. Instead, the term "whistleblower" has been applied by more approving sources to such people since the mid-20th century. The US-American Edward Snowden (former member of the NSA) and the Russian Grigory Rodchenkov (former director of the Moscow Anti-Doping Center who became a whistleblower on doping practices in Russia) are two famous recent examples.

== See also ==
- Denunciation (penology)
- Delator
- Stop Snitchin'
- Witch hunt
- Yiku sitian
- Misprison
