= Icarus (2017 film) =

2017 documentary film by Bryan Fogel

- Film release poster
- Directed by: Bryan Fogel
- Written by: Bryan Fogel; Mark Monroe; Jon Bertain; Timothy Rode
- Produced by: Dan Cogan; Bryan Fogel; David Fialkow; Jim Swartz
- Cinematography: Jake Swantko; Timothy Rode
- Edited by: Jon Bertain; Kevin Klauber; Timothy Rode
- Music by: Adam Peters
- Production companies: Alex Productions; Diamond Docs; Impact Partners
- Distributed by: Netflix
- Release dates: January 20, 2017 (Sundance); August 4, 2017 (United States)
- Running time: 121 minutes
- Country: United States
- Languages: English; Russian (Note: With a few dialogue in German)

Icarus is a 2017 American documentary film by Bryan Fogel. It was an initial attempt by Fogel to expose the inadequacy of existing policies and procedures to catch athletes who use banned performance-enhancing substances. But later, the project shifted its focus after pressures related to the World Anti-Doping Agency's investigation of doping in Russia led Grigory Rodchenkov, the head of the Moscow Anti-Doping Laboratory and one of Fogel's primary advisors, to flee Russia and become a whistleblower.

The film premiered on January 20, 2017, at the 2017 Sundance Film Festival, where it won The Orwell Award, a U.S. Documentary Special Jury Award. Its distribution rights were acquired by Netflix, which released Icarus for streaming globally on August 4, 2017. On March 4, 2018, the film won Best Documentary Feature at the 90th Academy Awards.

== Synopsis ==
While investigating the furtive world of illegal doping in sports, Bryan Fogel, an American filmmaker and a high-level amateur cyclist, connects with Russian scientist Grigory Rodchenkov, the director of the Moscow Anti-Doping Laboratory. Rodchenkov agrees to help Fogel with an experiment to prove that the current way athletes are tested for drugs is insufficient. He is in a process of designing a protocol that will allow Fogel to take banned performance-enhancing drugs while avoiding positive drug tests. As Fogel continues his training, he and Rodchenkov become friends, and Rodchenkov even visits the United States to collect urine samples from Fogel.

Fogel, disappointed after doing worse in the grueling Haute Route Alps race while doping than he had done the previous year, visits Rodchenkov in Moscow. Back at home, he follows developing allegations of a Russian state-sponsored Olympic doping program overseen by Rodchenkov, and sees images in the international media of his friend and the lab he had visited. The ensuing investigation leads Rodchenkov to a forced resignation as the Moscow laboratory head. Worried that he may be "silenced" by the Russian government, Rodchenkov works with Fogel to come to Los Angeles and go into hiding. Using documentation that Rodchenkov brought with him as evidence, the pair speak to the U.S. Department of Justice and the New York Times, alleging that Russia has conspired to cheat in the Olympics for decades, and Rodchenkov was hired to ramp up the operation after the embarrassing performance of Russia in the 2010 Winter Olympics in Vancouver.

On camera, Rodchenkov testifies that, at the 2014 Winter Olympics in Sochi, he and his team, with the help of the Russian Federal Security Service, switched the steroid-tainted urine of the Russian national team with clean samples. His spreadsheets, discs, e-mails, and other incriminating evidence of Russian governmental involvement forced the World Anti-Doping Agency (WADA) and the International Olympic Committee to investigate. After WADA's independent investigation confirms Rodchenkov's claims, U.S. law enforcement places him in witness protection. Rodchenkov's lawyer, Jim Walden, described the threats to Rodchenkov's life and the suspicious deaths of two of Rodchenkov's associates.

The film ends with title cards stating that the Russian government continues to deny it had any involvement with the program, and that Rodchenkov remains in protective custody in the United States.

== Reception ==
=== Critical response ===
On the film review aggregator website Rotten Tomatoes, 92% of 50 critics' reviews of the film are positive, with an average rating of 7.2/10; the site's "critics consensus" reads: "Icarus is eye-opening viewing for professional sports enthusiasts, yet it should also prove thoroughly gripping even for filmgoers who might not necessarily be drawn to the subject." On Metacritic, the film has a weighted average score of 68 out of 100 based on reviews from 16 critics, indicating "generally favorable" reviews.

Writing for RogerEbert.com, Brian Tallerico gave the film 3 out of 4 stars and called it "a crackling documentary".

The trailer for the film was screened during a February 2018 meeting of the U.S. Helsinki Commission (also known as the Commission on Security and Cooperation in Europe). During that meeting, attorney Jim Walden spoke about Rodchenkov's work, as well as the need for better enforcement by the World Anti-Doping Agency and the International Olympic Committee in order to eliminate corruption and restore integrity to the international athletic community.

At the 90th Academy Awards, the film won the Academy Award for Best Documentary Feature. During his on-stage acceptance remarks at the ceremony, director Bryan Fogel said:

We dedicate this award to Dr. Grigory Rodchenkov, our fearless whistle-blower who now lives in great danger. We hope Icarus is a wake-up call — yes, about Russia, but more than that, about the importance of telling the truth, now more than ever.

=== Accolades ===
Award	Date of ceremony	Category	Recipient(s)	Result	Ref.
Academy Awards	March 4, 2018	Best Documentary Feature	Bryan Fogel and Dan Cogan	Won	
Austin Film Critics Association	January 8, 2018	Best Documentary	Icarus	Nominated	
British Academy Film Awards	February 18, 2018	Best Documentary	Bryan Fogel and Dan Cogan	Nominated	
Cinema Eye Honors	January 11, 2018	Hell Yeah Prize	Icarus	Won	
Cinema Eye Honors	January 11, 2018	The Unforgettables	Grigory Rodchenkov	Won	
Cinema for Peace Awards	February 19, 2018	Most Valuable Documentary of the Year	Icarus	Nominated	
Critics' Choice Documentary Awards	November 2, 2017	Best Sports Documentary	Icarus	Won	
Directors Guild of America Awards	February 3, 2018	Outstanding Directorial Achievement in Documentaries	Bryan Fogel	Nominated	
Hamptons International Film Festival	August 26, 2017	SummerDocs Audience Award	Icarus	Won	
IDA Documentary Awards	December 9, 2017	VideoSource Award	Icarus	Nominated	
Motion Picture Sound Editors Golden Reel Awards	February 18, 2018	Outstanding Achievement in Sound Editing – Feature Documentary	E.J. Holowicki, Chris Barnett, Adam Peters, and Mikael Sandgren	Nominated	
Primetime Emmy Awards	September 9, 2018	Outstanding Documentary or Nonfiction Special	Bryan Fogel, Dan Cogan, David Fialkow, and Jim Swartz	Nominated	
Primetime Emmy Awards	September 9, 2018	Outstanding Directing for a Documentary/Nonfiction Program	Bryan Fogel	Nominated	
Primetime Emmy Awards	September 9, 2018	Outstanding Writing for a Nonfiction Program	Bryan Fogel, Mark Monroe, and Jon Bertain	Nominated	
Satellite Awards	February 11, 2018	Best Motion Picture, Documentary	Icarus	Nominated	
Sundance Film Festival	January 28, 2017	Special Jury Award: The Orwell Award	Icarus	Won	
Sundance Film Festival London	June 4, 2017	Audience Award	Icarus	Won	

== See also ==
- Doping in Russia
- Garcia Report
- List of films about bicycles and cycling
- Richard McLaren
- 2017 Sundance Film Festival
