= David Fialkow =

American venture capitalist

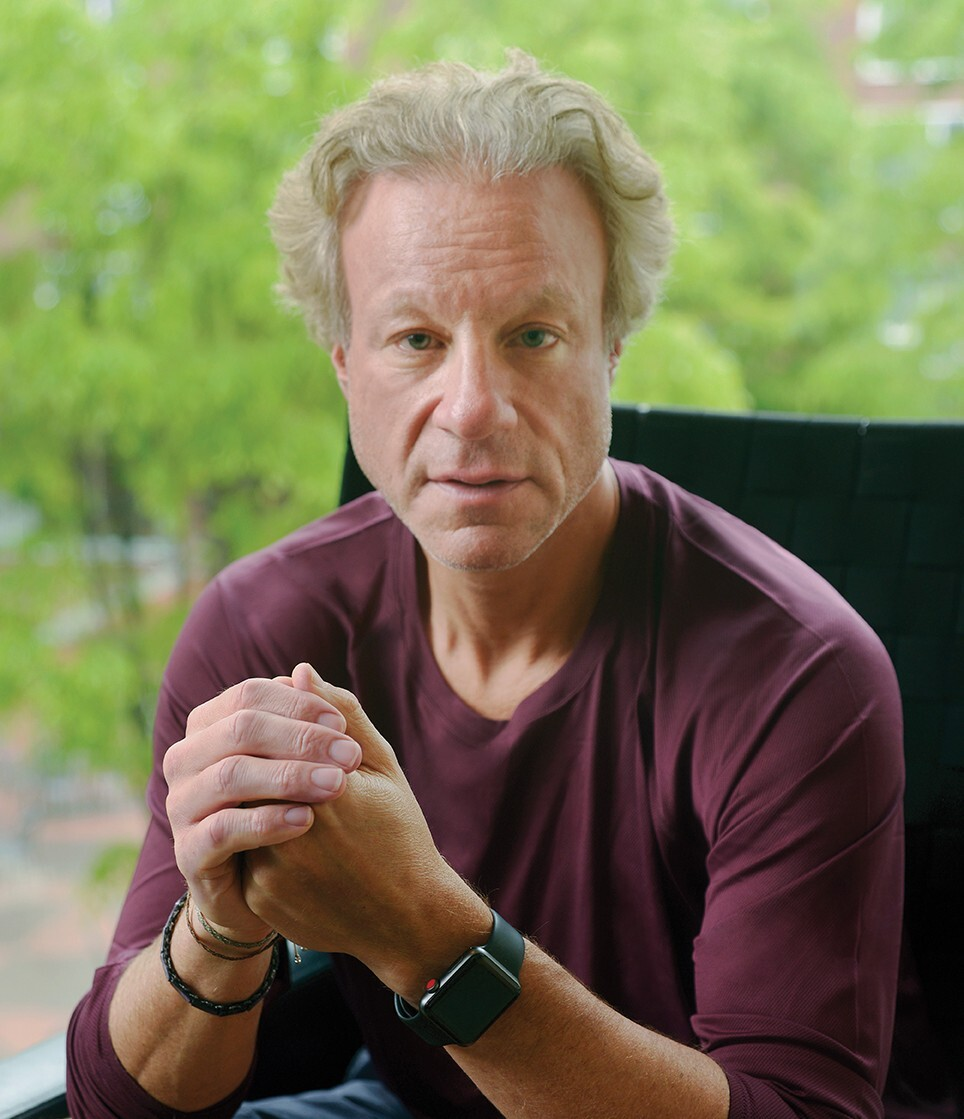
- David Fialkow
- Born: October 18, 1958 (age 67); Boston, Massachusetts, U.S.
- Education: Colgate University (BA); Boston College (JD)
- Occupation: Venture capitalist
- Known for: Co-founder of General Catalyst Producer of Icarus and Navalny
- Spouse: Nina Fialkow

David P. Fialkow (born October 18, 1958) is an American billionaire venture capitalist and a documentary filmmaker and producer. He is the co-founder of General Catalyst, a $40bn venture capital firm focused on early-stage and growth investments. He is also a producer of the Oscar-winning documentaries Icarus and Navalny.

== Early life and education ==
David Fialkow was born in Boston, Massachusetts, and attended Buckingham Browne & Nichols School in Cambridge. Fialkow then attended Colgate University, where he earned a B.A. in fine arts, with a concentration in film.

Fialkow graduated from Colgate in 1981. He took a year off to make a documentary film on Biking and run a T-shirt business before entering law school. He earned a J.D. degree from Boston College in 1985.

== Career ==
=== Early career ===
Fialkow met fellow General Catalyst Co-Founder Joel Cutler, with whom he would launch a number of successful businesses, in first grade. While an undergraduate at Colgate, Fialkow started a successful T-shirt business. In 1987, while still in law school, he also co-founded Last-Minute Travel Company (later changed to National Leisure Group), which offered discounted vacations for individuals with flexible schedules. By the time of its sale in 1995, Last-Minute Travel was the second-largest vacation package provider in the United States.

Among other jobs that he held while in undergraduate and law school, Fialkow worked as a driver for leveraged buyout pioneer Thomas H. Lee. After graduation, Fialkow worked as an associate at Lee's eponymous firm as well as U.S. Venture Partners. Along with Cutler, he also founded a number of applied technology-based platforms and tools for the travel, financial services, specialty retail, and payment processing industries. In addition to National Leisure Group, these included:

- Alliance Development Group, sold to MyPoints.com
- Retail Growth ATM Systems, sold to PNC Bank
- Starboard Cruise Services, sold to LVMH

=== General Catalyst ===
Fialkow co-founded General Catalyst with Cutler in Cambridge in 2000.

In 2017, Fialkow was added to the Forbes Midas List and was named one of the "Most Influential People in Boston" by Boston Magazine in 2018.

=== Board memberships ===
Fialkow is on the board of The MIT Corporation and Pan-Mass Challenge. He is also Chairman of The Engine, Tough Tech accelerator and venture firm launched by MIT. He was previously a member of the Board of Directors of the Boston Beer Company (Sam Adams).

== Documentary filmmaking ==
Fialkow first studied film at Colgate University. While attending Colgate, Fialkow participated in the university's Global Study program, where he focused on making films. Following the end of the program, he earned a grant to continue making films on his own. After graduation, Fialkow continued to produce documentary films as a hobby.

Fialkow and his wife, Nina, also an independent documentary producer who has worked for Boston PBS affiliate WGBH-TV, where she was an executive producer of This Old House, The Victory Garden and the Julia Child cooking show, The French Chef, are members of Impact Partners, a film partnership focused on developing films with a social justice theme.

=== Icarus ===
Fialkow, a cycling enthusiast and former chair of the Pan-Mass Challenge charity bike-a-thon initiated by Billy Starr, was a producer of the 2017 documentary film Icarus, which chronicled director Bryan Fogel's exploration of the underground world of doping in the world of cycling. The film chronicles Fogel's use of performance-enhancing drugs to win an amateur cycling race and his discovery of a major international scandal, involving Grigory Rodchenkov, the head of the Russian anti-doping laboratory.

The film premiered at the Sundance Film Festival on January 20, 2017 and was awarded the U.S. Documentary Special Jury Award (Orwell Award). Netflix acquired the distribution rights for the film and released the documentary globally on August 4, 2017. Icarus won the Oscar for the Best Documentary Feature at the 90th Academy Awards.

Fogel said of Fialkow's contributions to the film:

So often, the financier is looking over your shoulder. David is somebody who empowers people to do their best work and he’s someone who’s going to fight for you. You don’t get that every day in this business. In fact, you don’t get that any day. He’s truly inspiring and one of a kind.

=== Navalny ===
In 2022, David and Nina were executive producers on documentary film, Navalny which chronicled the life of Alexei Navalny, who survived an assassination attempt by poisoning with a lethal nerve agent in August 2020. Navalny premiered at the Sundance Film Festival and went on to win Best Documentary Feature at the 95th Academy Awards and Best Documentary at the 2023 BAFTA Awards.

=== Filmography ===
Following the commercial and financial success of Icarus, both David and Nina have remained active as filmmakers. The pair have worked on a number of projects, include co-producing The Fourth Estate, a four-part miniseries that chronicled The New York Times' coverage of the White House. The series, which originally aired on Showtime, was nominated for Outstanding Documentary or Nonfiction Series at the 70th Primetime Emmy Awards.

Fialkow's film credits include:

Title	Year	Contributor
Icarus	2017	Producer (Oscar win)
Bending the Arc	2017	Executive Producer
Our New President	2018	Executive Producer
The Fourth Estate	2018	Executive Producer
The Dissident	2020	Executive Producer
Paper & Glue	2021	Co-Executive Producer
Citizen Ashe	2021	Executive Producer
The First Wave	2021	Executive Producer
32 Sounds	2022	Executive Producer
Aftershock	2022	Executive Producer
Navalny	2022	Social Impact Executive Producer (Oscar win)
How to Survive a Pandemic	2022	Executive Producer
Icarus: The Aftermath	2022	Executive Producer
Retrograde	2022	Executive Producer
The Grab	2022	Executive Producer
Flight/Risk	2022	Executive Producer
The Lincoln Project	2022	Executive Producer
Beyond Utopia	2023	Executive Producer
Another Body	2023	Co-Executive Producer
Sugarcane	2024	Executive Producer

== Philanthropy ==
Fialkow was the chairman of the Pan-Mass Challenge, a 100-plus mile bike-a-thon that benefits the Dana-Farber Cancer Institute. In 2024, the organization raised $75 million for the institute for a total of over $1 billion.

His non-profit involvement also includes:

- Leadership Council, Facing History and Ourselves
- Board of Trustees, MV Youth
- Board of Trustees, Boys and Girls Club of Boston
- Member, Council on Foreign Relations
- MIT
