= Denver Jewish Day School =

Jewish school in Colorado, US

Location
- 2450 South Wabash Street; Denver, Colorado 80231; United States; 39°40′18″N 104°53′22″W

Information
- School type: Private Jewish day school
- Religious affiliation: Jewish
- Denomination: Pluralistic
- Established: 1975 (51 years ago)
- CEEB code: 060436
- NCES School ID: AA001232
- Head of school: Avi Halzel
- Grades: PreK-12
- Nursery years taught: Pre Kindergarten
- Enrollment: 323
- Campus size: 24 acres (97,000 m^{2})
- Colors: Red and black
- Slogan: Extraordinary education, timeless tradition, inspired lives.
- Athletics: CHSAA 1A
- Athletics conference: 5280 League
- Mascot: Tiger
- Accreditation: Association of Colorado Independent Schools
- NCES School ID: AA001232
- Website: www.denverjds.org

Denver Jewish Day School, (DJDS) is an independent pluralistic Pre-K–12 Jewish day school in Denver, Colorado. Enrollment was 322 students as of 2023.

== History ==
Theodor Herzl Day School, named after Theodor Herzl known best as the visionary of the State of Israel, is a community Jewish day school established in 1975, and the Rocky Mountain Hebrew Academy, a co-ed Jewish high school established in 1979, combined to become the Denver Campus for Jewish Education in 2002. Now the school is known as Denver Jewish Day School.

== Campus ==
The 24-acre campus is divided between the lower division (Pre-K–5) and the upper division (6–12). The upper school area consists of a school building with lockers and classrooms for students in addition to an attached full-size gymnasium for athletics and special events. The lower school consists of classrooms and administrative offices as well as a playground for recess. On the perimeter of campus there is a baseball diamond, and throughout the campus there are lawns. The campus includes a ¼-acre urban educational featuring gardens, goats, chickens, and a greenhouse.

== Curriculum ==
Denver Jewish Day School offers a dual-curriculum in both General Studies (English, Math, Science, Literature, Language) as well as Judaic Studies (Hebrew, Bible, Jewish History). The school is accredited by the Association of Colorado Independent Schools (ACIS) a regional affiliate of the National Association of Independent Schools. (NAIS) The school is also a part of a part of PRIZMAH: Center for Jewish Day Schools.

== Extracurricular activities ==
The DJDS athletic teams, known as the Tigers (as a nod to the upper school's mascot when it was called RMHA), participate in interscholastic competition in baseball, basketball, soccer, volleyball, cross country, and e-sports. The basketball program drew media attention in February 2008 after the school's request to the Colorado High School Activities Association for some scheduling flexibility to avoid playing games during the Jewish sabbath was denied. In 2023 the Varsity Boys Basketball team won the Colorado State Championship.

== Notable attendees ==
- Shayna Rose - Actress
- Bryan Fogel - Winner of the 2018 Academy Award for Best Documentary Feature for his film Icarus
