= Court of Arbitration for Sport =

International arbitral body for sports disputes

- Tribunal arbitral du sport
- Established: 1984
- Location: Lausanne, Switzerland
- Appeals to: Federal Supreme Court of Switzerland
- Website: www.tas-cas.org

President
- Currently: John Coates
- Since: 2011

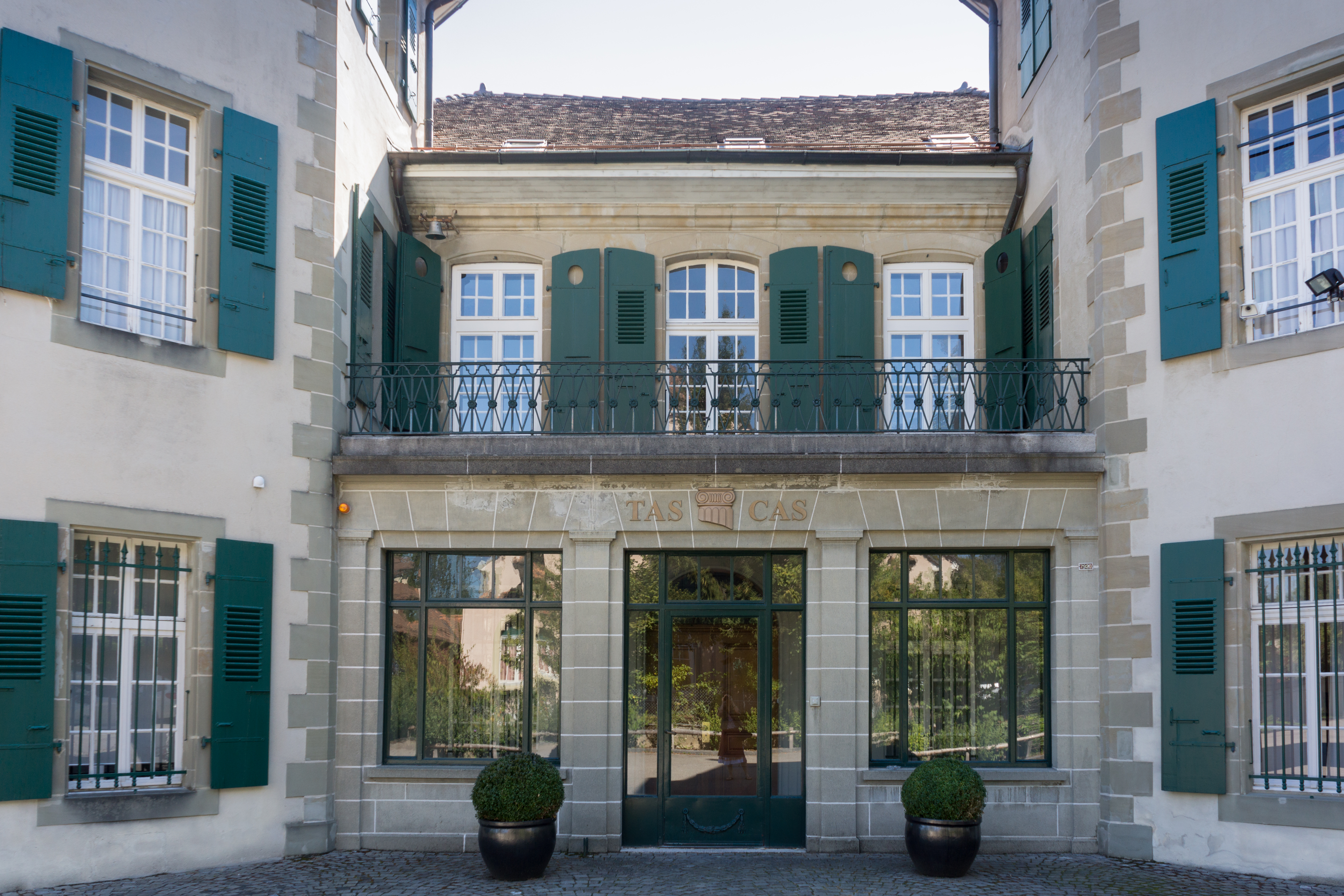
Headquarters, in Lausanne, Switzerland

The Court of Arbitration for Sport (CAS; French: Tribunal arbitral du sport, TAS) is an international body established in 1984 by the International Olympic Committee to settle disputes related to sport through arbitration. Its headquarters are in Lausanne, Switzerland, and its courts are located in New York City, Sydney, and Lausanne. Temporary courts are established in current Olympic host cities.

The International Council of Arbitration for Sport (ICAS) was established simultaneously, and a single president presides over both bodies. The ICAS, which has a membership of 20 individuals, is responsible for the financing of and financial reporting by the CAS, and it appoints the Director-General of the CAS.

== Jurisdiction and appeals ==
Generally speaking, a dispute may be submitted to the CAS only if an arbitration agreement between the parties specifies recourse to the CAS. However, according to rule 61 of the Olympic Charter, all disputes in connection with the Olympic Games can only be submitted to CAS, and all Olympic international federations (IF) have recognised the jurisdiction of CAS for at least some disputes.

Through compliance with the 2009 World Anti-Doping Code, all signatories, including all Olympic international federations and National Olympic Committees, have recognised the jurisdiction of CAS for anti-doping rule violations. Starting in 2016, an anti-doping division of CAS judges, who specialize in doping cases at the Olympic Games, replaced the IOC disciplinary commission. These decisions can be appealed to CAS's ad hoc court in the Olympic host city or, if the ad hoc court is no longer available, to the permanent CAS. The inaugural anti-doping division handled eight cases, of which seven were doping cases within its jurisdiction.

As a Swiss arbitration organization, decisions of the CAS can be appealed to the Federal Supreme Court of Switzerland. Appeals of arbitration decisions are generally not successful, and no evaluation of the merits takes place, with the evaluation mainly based on whether procedural requirements have been met, and whether the award is incompatible with public policy. As of March 2012, there have been seven successful appeals. Six of the upheld appeals were procedural in nature. Overruling a CAS decision on the case's merits is extremely rare. It occurred in 2012 for the first time in more than 20 years when the Federal Supreme Court overturned the case of Matuzalém, a Brazilian football player accused of breach of contract. In 2020, the Supreme Court overturned the case of Sun Yang, a Chinese swimmer accused of doping. CAS decisions can be the subject of further appeal to the European Court of Human Rights (ECHR). For example, the ECHR found CAS and the Federal Supreme Court discriminated against and violated the privacy of runner Caster Semenya.

German speed skater Claudia Pechstein, who was unsuccessful in lifting a doping-related suspension in her CAS case, appealed to the Federal Court of Justice of Germany, which, however, ruled against her, recognising a lack of jurisdiction to revisit her case. The Federal Court ruled that CAS met the requirements of a court of arbitration according to German law and that CAS's independence from the parties was secured by the method of selecting arbitrators and the possibility to appeal to the Swiss Federal Tribunal. However, this decision was in turn overturned by the Federal Constitutional Court of Germany, which ordered a re-trial.

=== Fees and costs ===
Proceedings before the CAS require payment of fees. As of 2025 appellants pay a fee of 1000 CHF when filing. On accepting a case, CAS sets a fee as an advance on arbitration costs, normally paid in equal shares by the parties. If the advance is not paid, proceedings are terminated. The advance may be several tens of thousands of Swiss francs.

== History ==
With the intermixing of sports and politics, the body was originally conceived by International Olympic Committee (IOC) president Juan Antonio Samaranch to deal with disputes arising during the Olympics. It was established as part of the IOC in 1984.

In 1992, the case of Gundel v. La Fédération Equestre Internationale was decided by the CAS, and then appealed to the Federal Supreme Court of Switzerland, challenging CAS impartiality. The Swiss court ruled that the CAS was a true court of arbitration but drew attention to the numerous links between the CAS and the IOC.

In response, the CAS underwent reforms to make itself more independent of the IOC, both organizationally and financially. The most significant change resulting from this reform was the creation of an "International Council of Arbitration for Sport" (ICAS) to look after the running and financing of the CAS, thereby taking the place of the IOC.

As of 2022, 9695 cases had been submitted to CAS since 1986. Ordinary and ad hoc cases were first accepted in 1995, mediation cases in 1999, and anti-doping cases in 2016. As of August 2024, there are 422 CAS Arbitrators around the world, with 216 from Europe, and 52 Mediators.

== ICAS board ==
| Designation | Name | Country |
|---|---|---|
| ICAS/CAS president | John Coates | Australia |
| ICAS vice-presidents | Michael Lenard | United States |
| ICAS vice-presidents | Elisabeth Steiner | Austria |
| ICAS vice-presidents | Antonio Arimany | Spain |
| President of CAS Ordinary Division | Carole Malinvaud | France |
| President of Appeals Arbitration Division | Corinne Schmidhauser | Switzerland |
| Non-member secretary and CAS director general | Matthieu Reeb | Switzerland |

== ICAS Members (2023–2026) ==
| Name | Country |
|---|---|
| Abdullah Al Hayyan | Kuwait |
| Antonio Arimany, ICAS vice-president | Spain |
| John Coates, ICAS president | Australia |
| Ivo Eusebio, president of the Anti-Doping Division | Switzerland |
| Louis Everard | Netherlands |
| Emilio Garcia Silvero | Spain |
| Dyalá Jiménez Figueres | Costa Rica |
| Silja Kanerva | Finland |
| Michael Lenard, ICAS vice-president | United States |
| Carole Malinvaud, president of the CAS Ordinary Division | France |
| Dariusz Mioduski | Poland |
| Giulio Napolitano, deputy president of the Ordinary Arbitration Division | Italy |
| Ellen Gracie Northfleet | Brazil |
| Kevin Plumb | United Kingdom |
| Mikael Rentsch | Sweden |
| David W. Rivkin, deputy president of the Anti-Doping Division | United States |
| Corinne Schmidhauser, president of the Appeals Arbitration Division | Switzerland |
| Tricia Smith | Canada |
| Nicola Spirig | Switzerland |
| Elisabeth Steiner, ICAS vice president and deputy president of the Appeals Arbitration Division | Austria |
| Xue Hanqin | China |
| Mattieu Reeb, non-member secretary | Switzerland |

== Jurisprudence examples of note ==
=== Doping ===
- In March 2011, CAS decided its first case on athlete biological passports (ABP) when it suspended two Italian cyclists, Franco Pellizotti and Pietro Caucchioli, for two years based on evidence from their blood profiles.

Prior to that, the case of skater Claudia Pechstein had been decided (2009/A/1912 & 1913) on similar grounds. Writing in the 2011/2 CAS Bulletin regarding the institution of the ABP program, CAS Counsel Despina Mavromati differentiated between the two types of cases and wrote:

It is noteworthy that CAS had already issued an award suspending an athlete based on the longitudinal profiling of the biological markers before the adoption of the ABP by the IFs [international federations]: in CAS 2009/A/1912 & 1913 [Pechstein], the Panel suspended an Olympic athlete after the biological data showed irregular blood values. According to CAS, those abnormal values were not caused by an error in a laboratory, as the athlete asserted, but due to the banned manipulation of the athlete’s blood. The essential difference between ABP judgments and the CAS 2009/A/1912 & 1913 consists in that in the latter case, the athlete's blood data was drawn from a sample the athlete gave at the federations championships and therefore not from data gathered by an official systematic program run by the athlete's union.

- In 2001, the court decided the case of Andreea Răducan v. International Olympic Committee. This was a controversial anti-doping case, where it was fairly clear the athlete received cold and flu tablets from her doctor. This resulted in a positive urine test, with the court concluding:

"The Panel is aware of the impact its decision will have on a fine, young, elite athlete. It finds, in balancing the interests of Miss Raducan with the commitment of the Olympic Movement to drug-free sport, the Anti-Doping Code must be enforced without compromise."

- The court is reluctant to overturn field of play decisions, though it may do so in cases where there is clear evidence that the officials acted in bad faith or with arbitrariness. In CAS 2010/A/2090, the CAS Panel explained that the reason for this is not a matter of jurisdiction but arbitral self-restraint.
- In October 2011, in a case affecting the 2012 Summer Olympics, the court declared that a part of the Olympic Charter violated the World Anti-Doping Code. The "Osaka rule" therein had prevented athletes suspended for at least six months for anti-doping rule violations from competing at the Olympic Games following the suspension's expiration. The court later reaffirmed this decision, when it struck down a long-standing by-law of the British Olympic Association (BOA) preventing the selection of athletes sanctioned for doping. Both the IOC and BOA have responded by campaigning for adding a similar rule to the World Anti-Doping Code.
- In July 2016, CAS confirmed that the Russian Olympic Committee (ROC) could not enter track and field athletes for the 2016 Summer Olympics, except for those cleared by the IAAF under the new competition rules regarding "neutral athletes". As the IOC was not a party to the case, the panel found it lacked jurisdiction to decide on whether the IOC could allow such cleared athletes to represent Russia, allow them to compete independently, or refuse their participation entirely. The claimants disputed the validity and enforceability of IAAF Competition rule 22.1(a), regarding the suspension of the national federation (RusAF, formerly ARAF), and rule 22.1A, regarding the eligibility of athletes from suspended federations. The panel found that neither rule could be construed as sanctions, and for this and other reasons, they were consistent with the World Anti-Doping Code. The panels commented on the futility of the challenge to the new rule 22.1A, noting that as the rule provided athletes from Russia a new route to participation, a successful challenge would lead to the exclusion of athletes eligible under the rule, not the inclusion of other athletes. The panel decided against evaluating whether the principle of estoppel applies to sporting disputes, as it found the claims, in this case, would have failed. At the same time, in a separate decision, the panel rejected the appeals of 67 Russian athletes against the decisions of the IAAF denying their applications to appear as "neutral athletes" at the 2016 Summer Olympics. Darya Klishina was the only Russian athlete cleared by both the IAAF and the IOC. However, the IAAF declared her ineligible on 12 August based on new information. On 15 August, the CAS ad hoc court upheld Klishina's appeal.
- The International Paralympic Committee (IPC) decided to ban Russia from the 2016 Summer Paralympics due to the findings of the McLaren report. The appeal of the Russian Paralympic Committee (RPC) against the ban was dismissed by the CAS on 23 August. The court found that the suspension had a basis in the IPC rules and stated that it "was proportionate in the circumstances". The panel noted that it had not decided the rights of individual athletes. In its reasoned decision the panel elaborated on this point, stating that adverse consequences for the athletes represented by the RPC were not a reason to absolve the organisation from its legal responsibilities. The panel dismissed the claim that the IOC decision should have influenced the IPC decision, noting that the organisations have separate charters and rules. As the IPC also acts as an IF the court referred to the case between the RWF and the IWF where CAS upheld a similar suspension.
- In late 2017, the IOC disqualified a large number of Russian athletes' results from the 2014 Winter Olympics. The athletes were also given lifetime bans from future editions of the games. CAS registered 42 appeals, of which 39 were decided before the 2018 Winter Olympics. For 28 athletes, the panel found that the evidence presented by the IOC was not sufficient to establish rule violations. The disqualifications were upheld in the 11 remaining cases, but the ban was limited to the 2018 Games. The panel made clear that its mandate was limited to the individual cases. The case did not affect the status of Russian athletes participating in PyeongChang. The IOC expressed its regret with the decision regarding the 28 athletes whose appeals were fully upheld, stating that the level of proof required was inconsistent with earlier CAS decisions. The IOC also stated that the sanctions being lifted were not a sufficient reason for inviting the 28 athletes to compete at the 2018 Games. The IOC said it would consider its options after receiving the reasoned decision. In response to the ruling by CAS, Jim Walden, the attorney representing Dr. Grigory Rodchenkov, stated that the ruling made a "mockery" of the sanctions against Russia.
- In 2018, the World Anti-Doping Agency appealed to the CAS after FIFA reduced a suspension of Peruvian national team captain Paolo Guerrero. Guerrero had tested positive for cocaine after a World Cup qualifier against Argentina after ingesting a tea containing the substance. Guerrero was initially suspended for twelve months, but this was later halved by FIFA's appeal committee. WADA, in turn, appealed to CAS, and they imposed the fourteen-month ban in May 2018, which will cause Guerrero to miss the 2018 FIFA World Cup. CAS confirmed the existence of an anti-doping rule violation (ADRV) but also accepted that Guerrero was not trying to enhance his performance by ingesting the substance. The panel had considered that the player did bear some fault or negligence, even if it was not significant, and that he could have taken some measures to prevent him from committing the ADRV.

==== 2016 Summer Olympics ad hoc court ====
The ad hoc court for the 2016 Olympics had registered 18 cases by 3 August, surpassing the record two days before the Opening Ceremony. 11 of the cases were related to the various bans on Russian athletes related to the allegations of state-sponsored doping documented in the McLaren report. By the end of the Games the total number of cases was 28, 16 of which were related to the eligibility of Russian athletes.

- On 3 August, the ad hoc court dismissed the appeal of the Russian Weightlifting Federation against its complete suspension under article 12.4 of the International Weightlifting Federation (IWF) anti-doping rules. The panel stated that the findings of the McLaren report constituted "conduct connected with or associated with doping", and found that the IWF had acted within its discretion when it decided that the RWF had brought the sport of weightlifting into disrepute. The panel noted that the re-analysis of doping tests from the 2008 and 2012 Olympics had found nine cases of Russian athletes testing positive for Turinabol and stated that this indicated a centralized doping programme. Furthermore, the panel commented that the positive tests for Turinabol were consistent with the evidence provided by Dr Grigory Rodchenkov for the report.
- A separate panel of the ad hoc court found that the International Rowing Federation (FISA) had correctly applied the eligibility criteria outlined in the IOC decision of 24 July when it denied the entry of 17 athletes. One of the criteria in the IOC decision was that the ROC could not enter athletes that had previously served a doping ban. The CAS panel deciding the case involving the rowers Anastasia Karabelshikova and Ivan Podshivalov found this criterion unenforceable, and ordered FISA to evaluate the athletes according to the remaining criteria. The panel referred to previous decisions on the "Osaka rule" and the BOA by-law. The panel compared the IOC decision with the IAAF decision on Russian athletes, and noted that the IOC, unlike the IAAF, had left athletes with a previous doping conviction without any path to participation, contravening principles of natural justice. The same conclusion was shortly thereafter reached in the case of swimmer Yulia Efimova, who subsequently competed and medalled at the Games.
- In the cases of canoeists Natalia Podolskaya and Alexander Dyachenko and rower Ivan Balandin the panels dismissed the applications, upholding the part of the IOC decision of 24 July that removed the presumption of innocence from Russian athletes. Balandin challenged the legality of the IOC decision, while Podolskaya and Dyachenko only challenged its application. The panel in Balandin's case found no reason to annul the second paragraph of the IOC decision, which, among other criteria, established that nobody implicated in the McLaren report was eligible for participation at the Games. The panel noted that while the decision establishes a presumption of guilt, this presumption is rebuttable by individual athletes. All three athletes were found to have benefitted from the "Disappearing Positive Methodology" described in the McLaren report and thus failed to meet the eligibility criteria of the IOC decision. The panels differed as to which standard of proof they required for the athletes' rebuttal of this presumption.

=== Russian participation in international sports ===
- On 30 October 2026, the CAS ruled that Russia must be allowed to return to the ice hockey world championships, overturning the International Ice Hockey Federation's 2022 decision to exclude Russia from competition as a result of the Russian invasion of Ukraine. The ruling has led to severe backlash from various national hockey federations, including the IIHF, with each releasing statements opposing the ruling. On 3 November 2026, the prime minister of Canada, Mark Carney, announced that Russian players and team officials would not be allowed entry to Canada to play in the 2027 World Junior Ice Hockey Championships, set to be held in Canada starting on 26 December 2026. The CAS ruling may also affect the 2027 men's hockey championship, set to be held in Germany in May 2027. In response to the CAS ruling, the German hockey host federation is said to be considering returning its hosting rights. Seven of the sixteen participating teams have announced that if Russia is in the tournament, they will boycott any matches with Russia. The major sponsor for the tournament, the Czech automaker Skoda, has announced that in reaction to the CAS ruling, it will reconsider sponsoring the tournament if Russia is a participant. Other sponsors have made similar statements. On 13 November 2026, media reports suggested that the IIHF has filed a challenge to the CAS decision, based on allegations that two of the three CAS panel members who ruled in favour of Russia had undisclosed ties to Russia. Neither the CAS nor the IIHF have commented on the reports.
- In the same media release on October 30, 2026, the CAS announced that it had rejected appeals by the Russian Curling Association and Russian curlers against World Curling's ban on Russian participation in international curling events. The CAS explained that World Curling had demonstrated that the ban was tied to the well-functioning of their tournaments, which otherwise would face difficulties with athletes refusing to compete, organisations refusing to host, and visa refusals.
- In the same media release dated 30 October 2026, the CAS gave a summary of a number of other cases involving Russian athletes in a variety of sports, and the decisions it had rendered.

=== Other cases ===
- In July 2015, in a case involving the issue of sex verification in sports, the CAS issued an interim arbitral award suspending the regulations used by the IAAF to determine whether athletes with hyperandrogenism were eligible to compete in professional women's athletics. The regulations stated that athletes with testosterone levels above 10 nmol/L were not allowed to compete in the female category. The regulations were challenged by Indian sprinter Dutee Chand. The panel ordered the IAAF to file scientific evidence regarding the connection between athletic performance and elevated testosterone levels within two years of the issuance of the interim award. This deadline was extended by two months by the CAS after an agreement between the parties. In January 2018 the CAS suspended the case for six months, asking the IAAF to clarify whether it intended to replace the disputed regulations with new rules which would not affect Chand's events. If the IAAF were to modify its rules the case would terminate. The original regulations remain suspended. In 2019, the CAS upheld the new IAAF regulations regarding intersex athletes, which require athletes with certain specific intersex conditions to reduce their testosterone in order to participate in certain women's competitions.
- The court ruled in 2006 that Gibraltar had valid grounds for its application to join UEFA, forcing the organisation to hand it provisional membership. At the next UEFA Congress, however, Gibraltar was overwhelmingly rejected in a vote due to lobbying from Spain, in defiance of the CAS ruling. Gibraltar subsequently became a member of UEFA in 2013. In May 2016, CAS partially upheld Gibraltar's appeal against a decision by FIFA denying membership. The court did not grant FIFA membership but ruled that FIFA should grant a full membership as soon as possible. Gibraltar was granted membership at the FIFA Congress held later the same month.
- In 2010, the Irish Football Association (IFA) (the association of Northern Ireland) took its case to CAS after FIFA failed to prevent the Football Association of Ireland (FAI) (the association of the Republic of Ireland) from selecting Northern Irish-born players who had no blood link to the Republic. The CAS ruled in favour of the FAI and FIFA by confirming that they were correctly applying the regulations.
- In February 2020, Manchester City lodged an appeal to CAS against UEFA's decision to ban the club from European competitions for two years and to fine it €30,000,000 for alleged breaches of Financial Fair Play and Club Licensing regulations. The ban was rescinded by CAS on 13 July 2020 after the panel decided that the club 'did not disguise equity funding as sponsorship contributions'. However, the club was fined 10 million Euros for failing to co-operate with UEFA investigatory chamber in the first instance which breached UEFA Club Licensing Regulations.
- In 2015, UEFA banned its former president Michel Platini from football-related activity for six years. CAS lowered the ban to four years. Platini's appeals to Swiss courts and the European Court of Human Rights were unsuccessful.
- In July 2026, Aston Villa lodged an appeal with CAS regarding FIFA's decision to class their transfer of Brian Madjo from Metz as an international transfer of a minor, therefore blocking his registration, due to Madjo representing Luxembourg internationally in the past. Aston Villa argued that Madjo being born in England and playing for England's youth teams showed it was not an international transfer. On 4 August, CAS upheld Aston Villa's appeal and the player was able to be registered as an Aston Villa player immediately.
