= Jim Walden =

Jim Walden may refer to:

- Jim Walden (American football) (1938–2026), American football player and coach
- Jim Walden (lawyer) (born 1966), American lawyer
