= Michael Lenard =

American handball player

Personal information
- Full name: Michael Barry Lenard
- Nationality: United States
- Born: May 25, 1955 (age 71) Chicago, Illinois

Sport
- Sport: Handball

Michael Barry Lenard (born May 20, 1955) is an American former handball player who competed in the 1984 Summer Olympics. Lenard is the vice president of the International Council of Arbitration for Sport, having joined the organisation in 1994. In 2017, the US Olympic Committee (USOC) bestowed their highest honour on him, an Olympic Torch Award. Lenard has served for the USOC a member and then Vice-Chair of the USOC Athletes’ Advisory Committee, as the Vice-President of the organisation.
