= Jewtopia =

Play written by Bryan Fogel

- Written by: Bryan Fogel and Sam Wolfson
- Original language: English
- Genre: Comedy

Premiere
- Date premiered: May 8, 2003
- Place premiered: Coast Playhouse; West Hollywood, California

Jewtopia is a comedic play by Bryan Fogel and Sam Wolfson.

It focuses on two friends, Chris O'Connell and Adam Lipschitz, both approaching their 30th birthdays. Gentile Chris is interested in dating Jewish women because he feels that they will make his life easier by making all of life's decisions for him. Jewish Adam wants to date Gentile women because he does not wish to be reminded of his roots. The two team up and teach each other how to woo the women of their choice.

Most of the play's humor involves jokes about Jewish stereotypes with occasional humor about body parts and bodily functions. The play makes numerous references to the Jewish online dating website, Jdate.

Directed by Andy Fickman, the LA production opened on May 8, 2003 at West Hollywood's Coast Playhouse, where it ran for a year and sold out. Fogel and Wolfson headed the cast.

On October 21, 2004, the off-Broadway production, directed by John Tillinger and again starring the playwrights, opened at Manhattan's Westside Theatre after previews beginning on September 28, 2004. It ran very profitably for 27 previews and 1,052 regular performances over three and one half years and closed on April 29, 2007, with actors Josh Heine and Jeremy Rishe playing the roles of Chris and Adam.

Additional productions include runs in Tampa, Florida, Richmond, Virginia and Toronto, Ontario, Canada beginning in autumn 2007. A winter 2009 tour was planned.

In 2006, Fogel and Wolfson published Jewtopia: The Chosen Book for the Chosen People, a coffee table book inspired by the play.

== Film adaptation ==
On 14 July 2011, it was announced that a film adaptation of the play was in production. It stars Jennifer Love Hewitt and Ivan Sergei.
