= Jewtopia (film) =

- Theatrical release poster
- Directed by: Bryan Fogel
- Screenplay by: Bryan Fogel; Sam Wolfson
- Based on: Jewtopia
- Produced by: Bryan Fogel; Andy Fickman; Pavlina Hatoupis; Courtney Mizel; Tucker Tooley
- Starring: Jennifer Love Hewitt; Ivan Sergei; Joel David Moore; Wendie Malick; Nicollette Sheridan; Lin Shaye; Sharon Wilkins; Rita Wilson; Jon Lovitz
- Cinematography: Sandra Valde-Hansen
- Edited by: Wendy Smith
- Music by: Nathan Wang
- Production companies: Ministry of Content; Oops Doughnuts Productions
- Release date: April 26, 2012 (Newport Beach)
- Running time: 88 minutes
- Country: United States
- Language: English

Jewtopia (also known as Finding Ms. Right) is a 2012 independent comedy film, an adaptation of a long-running off-Broadway play of the same name. The film is directed by Bryan Fogel and written by Bryan Fogel and Sam Wolfson. It stars Jennifer Love Hewitt, Ivan Sergei, Joel David Moore, and Nicollette Sheridan.

== Plot ==
Christian O’Connell has met the girl of his dreams in Allison Marks. Unfortunately, Christian told Allison (who happens to be a rabbi’s daughter) that his name was Avi Rosenberg, and that he was Jewish—neither of which is true. Desperate to keep up the illusion, he turns to his childhood best friend, Adam Lipschitz, to teach him how to "act Jewish", but Adam has problems of his own, with a fiancée pushing him closer to a mental breakdown as their wedding approaches. With the best intentions, Adam and Christian attempt to help each other out, but things quickly get out of hand.

== Cast ==
- Jennifer Love Hewitt as Allison Marks
- Ivan Sergei as Christian O'Connell
- Joel David Moore as Adam Lipschitz
- Wendie Malick as Marci Marks
- Crystal Reed as Rebecca Ogin
- Peter Stormare as Buck O'Connell
- Nicollette Sheridan as Betsy O'Connell
- Lin Shaye as Dr. Sutton
- Rita Wilson as Arlene Lipschitz
- Sharon Wilkins as Nurse Boo
- Jamie-Lynn Sigler as Hannah Daniels
- Camryn Manheim as Eileen Daniels
- Tom Arnold as Bruce Daniels
- Jon Lovitz as Dennis Lipschitz
- Rachel Fox as Jill Lipschitz
- Wilmer Calderon as Juan
- Dominique Grund as Young Allison Marks
- Elaine Tan as Sala Khan
- Hayes MacArthur as Chuck O'Connell

== Production ==
The film was announced on July 15, 2011, with initial cast listings for the film being released concurrently. Sergei and Hewitt led the announcement, with the full cast list, including Moore, Wendie Malick, and Hewitt's former Ghost Whisperer co-star Camryn Manheim, being released on August 8, 2012.

Jewtopia began filming in Los Angeles, California, on July 18, 2011, and wrapped on August 10, 2011.

The film premiered in April 2012 at the Newport Beach Film Festival.

== Reception ==
On Rotten Tomatoes, the film has a rating of 18% based on reviews from 11 critics.
