= Andy Fickman =

American screenwriter and director

- Born: Andrew John Fickman; December 25, 1970 (age 55); Midland, Texas, U.S.
- Education: Texas Tech University
- Occupations: Television director, film director, producer
- Years active: 1990–present
- Spouse: Kristen Elizabeth Gura (m. 2016)

Andrew John Fickman (born December 25, 1970) is an American filmmaker. His credits as a theater director include the premiere of the Reefer Madness! musical, the first Los Angeles production of the play Jewtopia, and the Los Angeles, Off-Broadway and London productions of Heathers: The Musical.

He made his screen directing debut in 2002 with the teen sex comedy Who's Your Daddy?. The film was released directly to DVD in 2005.

He is formerly the director and producer of Internet Icon on YouTube, as well as the CBS sitcom Kevin Can Wait. He also has a production company entitled Oops Doughnuts Productions.

He directed comedy films She's the Man (2006), The Game Plan (2007), Paul Blart: Mall Cop 2 (2015) and Playing with Fire (2019). In 2021, he directed the first season of a NASCAR workplace comedy series The Crew on Netflix.

== Personal life ==
Fickman, who originates from Midland, Texas, moved with his family to Houston in 1974, and went to Lee High School (Houston, Texas). Fickman is a graduate of Texas Tech University and a member of Sigma Phi Epsilon fraternity. He was raised in Conservative Judaism. In 2013, he was honored with the Alumni of the Year award by United Synagogue Youth. In 2008, he started Oops Doughnuts Productions with a first look deal at Disney.

On October 8, 2016, Fickman married Kristen Elizabeth Gura, aunt of two-term Georgetown Phantoms president Gaby Gura, in Kristen's hometown of Rochester, Minnesota.

== Filmography ==
=== Film ===
Year	Title	Director	Producer	Writer	Notes
2002	Who's Your Daddy?	Yes	No	Yes	Direct-to-video
2006	She's the Man	Yes	No	No	
2007	The Game Plan	Yes	No	No	
2009	Race to Witch Mountain	Yes	No	No	
2010	You Again	Yes	Yes	No	
2012	Jewtopia	No	Yes	No	
2012	Parental Guidance	Yes	No	No	
2015	Paul Blart: Mall Cop 2	Yes	No	No	Nominated- Golden Raspberry Award for Worst Director
2015	Scouts Guide to the Zombie Apocalypse	No	Yes	No	
2019	Playing with Fire	Yes	No	No	
2023	One True Loves	Yes	Yes	No	
2024	Don't Turn Out the Lights	Yes	Yes	Yes	

Production executive

- Funny About Love (1990)
- Another You (1991)
- Hocus Pocus (1993)
- Man of the House (1995)

Associate producer

- Anaconda (1997)

=== Television ===
TV movies

Year	Title	Director	Executive Producer
2005	Reefer Madness: The Movie Musical	Yes	Yes
2021	Christmas...Again?!	Yes	No

TV series

Year	Title	Director	Executive Producer	Notes
2007	Aliens in America	Yes	No	1 episode
2011	Hellcats	Yes	No	1 episode
2012	Internet Icon	No	Yes	9 episodes
2013–2017	Liv and Maddie	Yes	Yes	Directed 32 episodes
2015	Austin & Ally	Yes	No	1 episode
2016	Recovery Road	Yes	No	1 episode
2016	The Odd Couple	Yes	No	1 episode
2016–2018	Kevin Can Wait	Yes	Yes	All episodes
2019	No Good Nick	Yes	No	4 episodes
2021	The Crew	Yes	Yes	All episodes
2024–2026	Wizards Beyond Waverly Place	Yes	Yes	8 episodes
