= Yiku sitian =

Chinese political and social movement during the Cultural Revolution

Yiku sitian (Chinese: 忆苦思甜; pinyin: Yì kǔ sī tián), which literally translates to recalling (past) bitterness and reflecting on (present) sweetness, is a concept that took form as a political movement and social practice in China mainly during the Cultural Revolution in the 1960s and 1970s.

== About ==
The People's Liberation Army (PLA) were introduced to suku (Chinese: 诉苦; pinyin: Sùkǔ) or 'speaking bitterness' as early as 1947 with the publication of a handbook in 1947 called "Speaking Bitterness and Seeking Vengeance" (Sùkǔ fùchóu). Following the communist take-over of China, residents in communities in Shanghai such as Fangua Lane started to have their first experiences with suku. This practice of suku influenced yiku sitian, aimed at legitimizing the regime. In 1960, rather than speaking bitterness, the practice shifted to remembering or recalling bitterness. The concept was first used by the military in China when soldiers of the PLA would hear of violence and famine like difficulties back home. The soldiers were made to remember that the current situation they were in was better than the past, and that they should be grateful to the party. In 1961 all units of the PLA had similar yiku sitian campaigns. By the end of 1963, hundreds of bureau offices and thousands of work units in Shanghai had conducted yiku sitian campaigns. Basic necessities of life such as food and shelter, and simple concepts such as the improvement of an open sewer in a poor community found their way into these campaigns.

Yiku sitian became a standard part of thought education in the country with the aim of engraining it and associated concepts into the worldview of the people; bitterness should not have to be eaten for a second time. The younger generation, those not part of the bitter past, who did not have any personal experiences of the hardships of the past, were also given frequent instruction into yiku sitian.

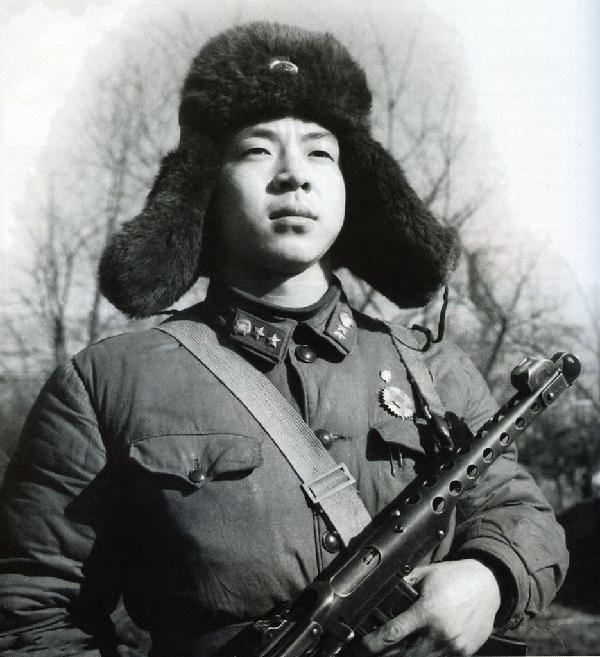
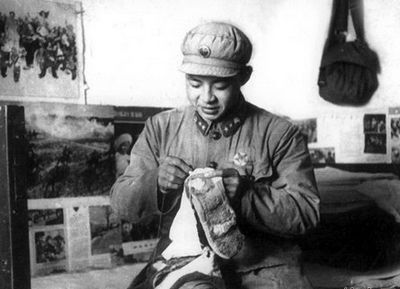
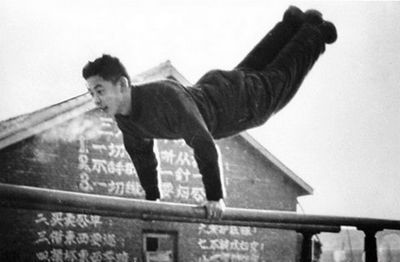
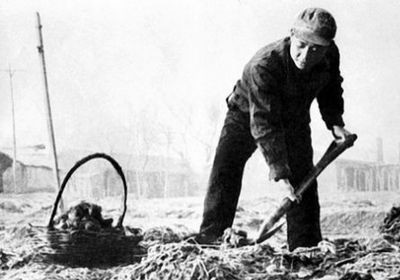
Lei Feng was made a yiku sitian role model.

What started out as propaganda, a distraction from an ongoing famine, became a state of extreme and continuous gratefulness to the CPC that the people of China were to be kept in. Role models were used by the state to promote its ideology. One of the most famous yiku sitian role models was Lei Feng. A neighborhood in Shanghai, Cucumber Lane, was used a model community for yiku sitian. To make the contrast between old and new obvious, old buildings were left standing to provide a stark contract with the new residential buildings in the area. Yiku sitian acts of public remembrance took the form of public oral narratives, writing articles in newspapers and essays written for school, topical songs and associated public meals.

== Legacy ==
Following the death of Mao Zedong and rise of Deng Xiaoping, the Chinese state no longer considered yiku sitian as a means to its ends, rather that the revolutionary emotions created were an obstacle to economic growth. While the practice of yiku sitian died down, the concept of using suffering as a means to political ends continued. What was once a personal practice, became a state practice, the state remembered and recalled on your behalf. In 1983, it found its form in the Anti-Spiritual Pollution Campaign, and later in Xi Jinping era anti-corruption campaigns.

== Bibliography ==
- Ho, Wing-chung (2010). Transition Study Of Postsocialist China, The: An Ethnographic Study Of A Model Community. World Scientific. pp. 25–27. ISBN 978-981-4464-83-3.
- Ge, Xinmei (March 2016), "A Tale of "Ku" (Bitter) V.S. "Tian" (Sweet): Understanding China's "Yiku Sitian" Movement in the 1960s and 1970s from the Perspective of Cultural Discourse Analysis", Doctoral Dissertations, Doctoral Dissertations: Doctor of Philosophy (PhD), Communication, University of Massachusetts Amherst, doi:10.7275/7904288.0
- Ho, Denise Y. (2018). Curating Revolution: Politics on Display in Mao's China. Cambridge University Press. ISBN 9781108417952.
- Javed, Jeffrey (2019), "Speaking Bitterness", in Sorace, Christian; Franceschini, Ivan; Loubere, Nicholas (eds.), Afterlives of Chinese Communism, Political Concepts from Mao to Xi, ANU Press (Australian National University Press), pp. 257–262, ISBN 978-1-78873-476-9, JSTOR j.ctvk3gng9.45
