= Bryan Fogel =

American dramatist

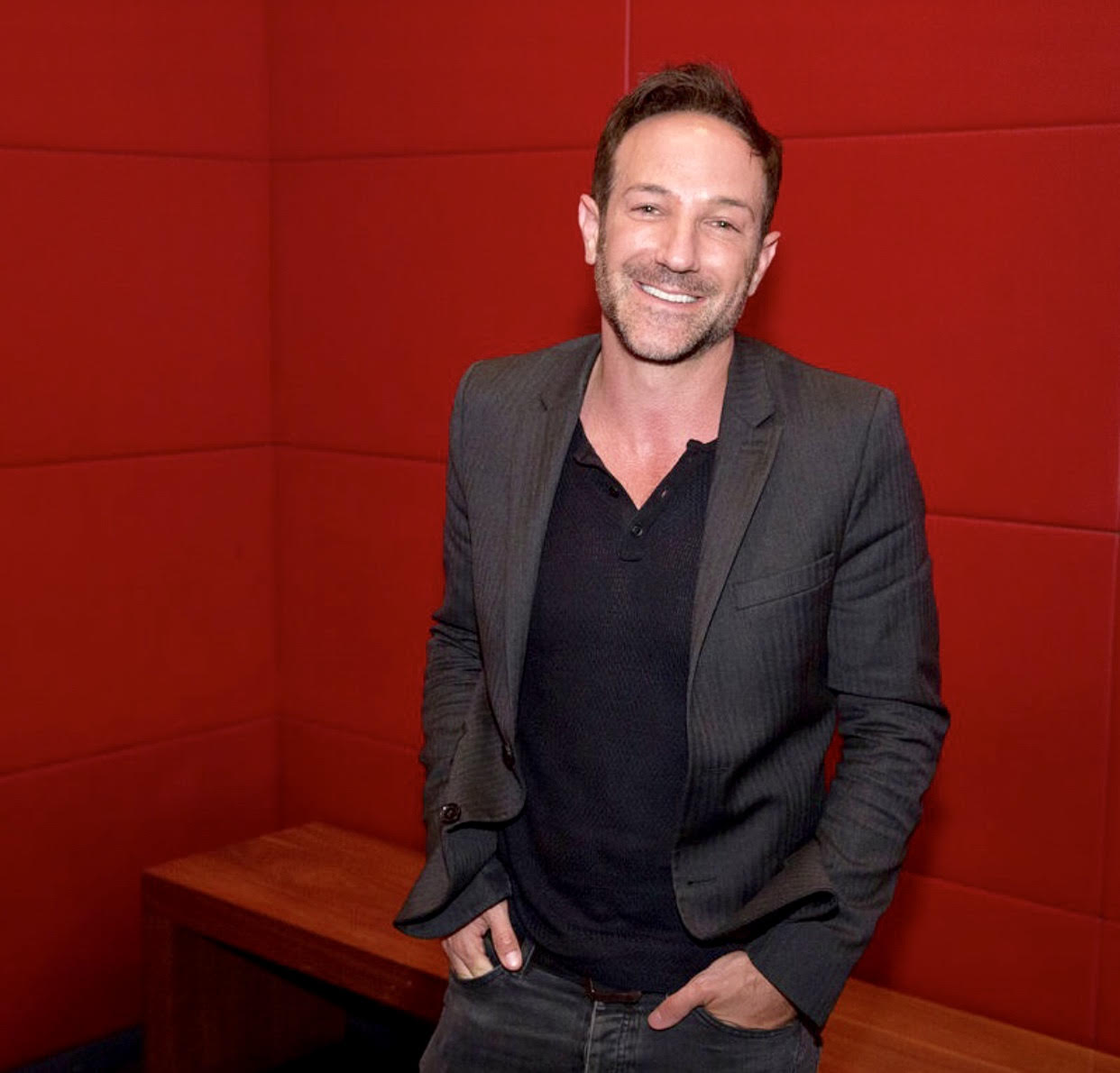
- Born: Denver, Colorado, United States
- Education: University of Colorado Boulder
- Occupations: Director, Producer, Writer, Actor
- Notable work: Icarus; The Dissident; Jewtopia
- Website: bryanfogel.com

Bryan Fogel is an American film director, producer, author, playwright, speaker and human rights activist, best known for the 2017 documentary Icarus, which won an Academy Award for Best Documentary Feature at the 90th Academy Awards in 2018.

== Early life and education ==
Fogel was born in Denver, Colorado. He attended the Denver Jewish Day School. He graduated from East High School and the University of Colorado Boulder.

== Career ==
Fogel began his career in Hollywood pursuing stand-up comedy and acting. He had a small part in the 2009 Disney movie Race to Witch Mountain.

Fogel has given keynote speeches to organizations around the world including the Oslo Freedom Forum in 2019 and 2020 - Human Rights Foundation and has appeared on ABC Nightline, Charlie Rose, Seth Meyers, Joe Rogan, CNN, ESPN, Meet The Press, The View, NPR, BBC and has been featured in publications around the globe including The Guardian. Fogel currently resides in Los Angeles.

=== Jewtopia ===
Fogel developed, co-wrote, and initially starred in the play Jewtopia, an off-Broadway comedy about the dating lives of two young men seeking Jewish women, which was made into a feature film. The play opened in Los Angeles in 2003 and ran for 300 performances. It moved on in 2004 to the off-Broadway Westside Theater in New York, where it ran for more than three years and over a thousand performances before closing in April 2007. It is one of the longest-running and fastest-recouping productions in Off-Broadway history.

Fogel co-authored the book Jewtopia: The Chosen Guide for the Chosen People, with Sam Wolfson. The book was published by Hachette Book Group and Fogel appeared on ABC's The View in support of the book.

Fogel directed, co-wrote and produced the feature film adaptation of Jewtopia, which was released in 2012. The film had its U.S. premiere as the opening night gala of the 13th Newport Beach International Film Festival.

=== Icarus ===
Fogel, as a lifelong cyclist, had followed Lance Armstrong’s rise and fall, in particular, his ability to evade doping detection. Fogel later connected with Russian scientist Grigory Rodchenkov, eventually preparing evidence and setting-up an interview for Rodchenkov at The New York Times. The Times story, published in 2016, presaged Russia's ban from the Olympic Games in 2018, 2020 and 2022.

Icarus, a film documenting these investigations, was described by The New York Times as "Illuminating" with Variety magazine calling it "A game changing documentary." Icarus premiered at the Sundance Film Festival, where it won U.S. Documentary Special Jury Award "The Orwell Award" and the first ever "Audience Choice" Award of Sundance Film Festival London. The film was acquired in a $5 million sale by Netflix and launched globally on August 4, 2017. The film won Netflix its first Feature Documentary Oscar.

=== The Dissident ===
After Icarus, Fogel co-wrote, directed and produced the 2020 American documentary film The Dissident, which follows the assassination of Jamal Khashoggi and Saudi Arabia's efforts to control international dissent. It had its world premiere at the Sundance Film Festival on January 24, 2020, and was released on December 18, 2020, by Briarcliff Entertainment. Fogel's screenplay for The Dissident won the Writers Guild of America Award for Best Documentary Screenplay award at the 73rd Writers Guild of America Awards in 2020 alongside Mark Monroe. It also received a nomination for "Best Documentary" at the British Academy Film Awards (BAFTA) in 2020, Fogel's second.

Despite generally positive reviews, the film struggled to find a distributor for eight months and was not able to run on a large streaming platform. Fogel believed this was due to those platforms' fear of offending the Saudi Arabian government and possibly losing subscribers.

=== Icarus: The Aftermath ===
Fogel completed Icarus: The Aftermath in 2022, a follow-up to the Oscar-winning doc Icarus. The film premiered that same year at the 49th Telluride Film Festival.

== Filmography ==
Title	Year	Role
Jewtopia	2012	Writer, director, executive producer
Icarus	2017	Writer, director, producer
The Dissident	2020	Writer, director, producer
Icarus: The Aftermath	2022	Writer, director, producer

== Awards ==
Year	Award	Category	Nominated work	Result	Ref.
2017	Sundance Film Festival	Documentary - Director	Icarus	Won	
2017	Sundance Film Festival	Grand Jury Prize - The Orwell Award	Icarus	Won	
2017	Critics' Choice Documentary Awards	Best Sports Documentary	Icarus	Won	
2018 (Note: Date is when the award was received, not necessarily the year of the film's theatrical exhibition.)	Academy Awards	Best Documentary Feature	Icarus	Won	
2018	Directors Guild of America	Outstanding Directorial Achievement in Documentaries	Icarus	Nominated	
2018	BAFTA Awards	Best Documentary	Icarus	Nominated	
2018	Satellite Awards	Best Documentary Film	Icarus	Nominated	
2018	Primetime Emmy Awards	Outstanding Directing for a Documentary/Nonfiction Program, Outstanding Writing for a Nonfiction Program, Outstanding Documentary or Nonfiction Special	Icarus	Nominated	
2020	Dallas–Fort Worth Film Critics Association	Best Documentary Film	The Dissident	4th place	
2020	Detroit Film Critics Society	Best Documentary	The Dissident	Nominated	
2021	BAFTA Awards	Best Documentary	The Dissident	Nominated	
2021	Writers Guild of America Awards	Best Documentary Screenplay	The Dissident	Won	
2021	Dublin International Film Festival	Special Jury Prize - Writer, Director	The Dissident	Won	
