= Jim Walden (lawyer) =

American lawyer (born 1966)

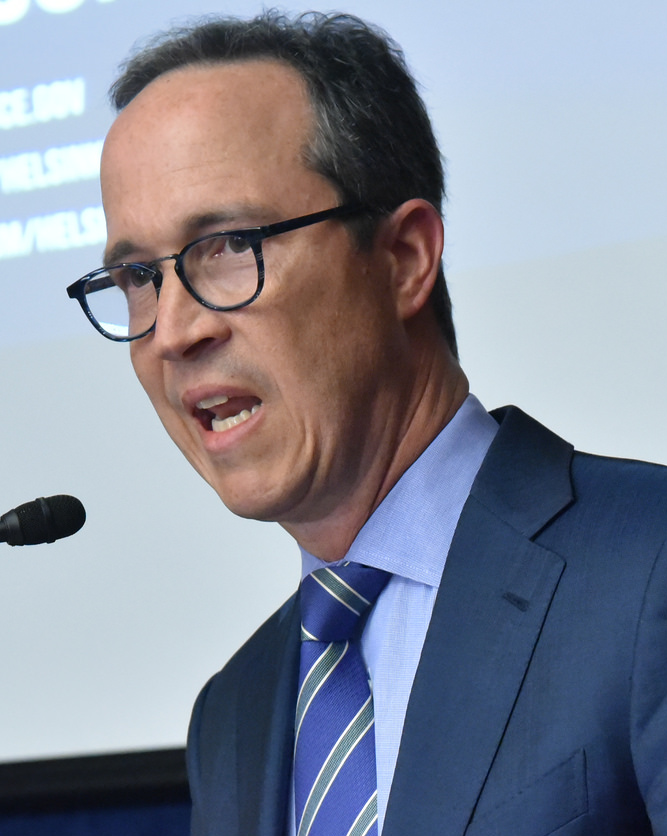
- Walden at the U.S. Helsinki Commission on the Russian Olympic doping scandal, 2018
- Born: James Alvin Walden Jr. January 19, 1966 (age 60)
- Education: Hamilton College (BA); Temple University (JD)
- Political party: Democratic (before 2006); Independent (2006–present)
- Website: Campaign website Official website

James Alvin Walden Jr. (born January 19, 1966) is an American attorney. After serving as an Assistant U.S. Attorney for the Eastern District of New York from 1993 to 2002, Walden entered private practice, where he has been a defense attorney for corporations in cases involving white-collar crime, antitrust violations, and market manipulation.

He has represented Grigory Rodchenkov, the former head of Russia's anti-doping laboratory, and UFC lightweight champion Conor McGregor, underground high stakes poker organizer Molly Bloom and plaintiffs in class action lawsuits against WeWork, the New York City Department of Education, and the New York City Housing Authority. He served as special counsel to a task force created by Governor of New Jersey Phil Murphy to investigate the administration of the state's tax incentive programs.

== Early life and education ==
James Alvin Walden Jr. was born on January 19, 1966, and grew up in Levittown, Pennsylvania.

Walden received his B.A. from Hamilton College. He graduated magna cum laude from Temple University School of Law in 1991 where he was first in his class.

== Legal career ==
=== Assistant U.S. Attorney ===
Following law school, Walden served as a law clerk for Judge Anthony J. Scirica in the U.S. Court of Appeals for the Third Circuit. Walden then joined the U.S. Attorney's Office for the Eastern District of New York as an assistant U.S. attorney. He served in this capacity for nearly nine years before turning to private practice.

While at the USAO, Walden led the prosecution of Li Yun-chung, a significant figure in an international heroin ring. U.S. Customs authorities in 1991 seized three-quarters of a ton of heroin in Hayward, California, then the largest seizure of heroin in U.S. history, and Li was indicted in U.S. District Court in 1996.

Walden also was part of the teams who prosecuted members and associates of New York's most prominent Mafia families, including the 1999 prosecution of Colombo family head Alphonse "Allie Boy" Persico. and the 2001 prosecution of Anthony Spero, who was convicted of ordering three murders, and racketeering, as a soldier and one-time acting boss of the Bonanno family. Spero was convicted on April 5, 2001, of ordering murders during his 20 years serving the family. Walden's work prosecuting organized crime was profiled in The New York Times and featured in a documentary filmed by National Geographic.

Walden also successfully prosecuted Chris Paciello (also known as Chris Ludwigsen), for his 1993 murder of Staten Island housewife Judith Shemtov during a robbery Paciello had planned in association with the Bonanno crime family. Paciello pleaded guilty to murder in 2000 and served a six-year sentence; he was credited for providing evidence that led to guilty pleas from nearly 20 people related to the Shemtov murder. Benjamin Brafman, Paciello's attorney, "estimated that 'more than 70 people' had been prosecuted directly and indirectly as a result of [Paciello's] cooperation'". This included testimony that Alphonse Persico plotted with Paciello in 1997 to kill a dissident mafioso. The identification of two made members of the Bonanno family ultimately led to the take-down of the entire crime organization. Walden appears in a 2018 "Vanity Fair Confidential" episode discussing the Shemtov murder and the Paciello prosecution and is cited extensively in the book Clubland: The Fabulous Rise and Murderous Fall of Club Culture.

=== Private practice ===
Walden spent three years as a partner at O'Melveny & Myers before joining the New York office of Gibson, Dunn & Crutcher LLP in 2006.

Walden co-chaired Gibson Dunn's White Collar-Criminal Defense & Investigations practice in addition to leading the office's pro bono efforts.

In 2015, Walden left Gibson Dunn to found a new firm, Walden Macht & Haran LLP, with fellow former prosecutors Timothy Macht and Sean Haran. The firm was founded with a focus on white-collar criminal defense, civil litigation and investigations. The firm also gave Walden a platform to continue representing advocacy and community groups.

==== Joseph Cassano and AIG ====
While a partner at Gibson Dunn & Crutcher, Walden, along with F. Joseph Warin, successfully represented Joseph Cassano, the CEO of AIG's Financial Products unit, for his alleged role in the 2008 financial crisis. U.S. Department of Justice investigators and prosecutors conducted an investigation into whether Cassano deliberately withheld information from investors and auditors. Walden utilized a proactive defense strategy by engaging prosecutors early in the process to present evidence, rather than engaging the public. Neither the Department of Justice nor the Securities and Exchange Commission ultimately brought charges against Cassano.

==== Molly Bloom ====
In 2013, Walden represented Molly Bloom, who was arrested and charged as part of a $100 million illegal poker game in Los Angeles that attracted wealthy individuals and celebrities. In 2014, Walden secured a lenient sentence for Bloom who was facing six months in federal prison for her involvement in the gambling ring. Bloom later wrote a book about her experiences called Molly's Game which was turned into a 2017 film by Aaron Sorkin. Actor Idris Elba portrays a fictionalized character based loosely on Walden.

==== Tether USDT ====
In 2019, Walden initiated representation of Tether, a cryptocurrency stablecoin company, in a consolidated class action lawsuit alleging $1.4 trillion in market manipulation damages.

==== William Anderson and Newsweek fraud investigation ====
In 2020, Walden defended William Anderson in a case stemming from a $30 million fraud and money-laundering investigation of Newsweek magazine executives, and related criminal charges, filed by the Manhattan District Attorney. Anderson pleaded guilty and received a non-custodial sentence.

==== WeWork class action litigation ====
In 2020, during the COVID-19 public health crisis, Walden represented WeWork customers located in New York, Los Angeles, Washington, D.C., and other U.S. cities, in a class action litigation demanding that the company cease charging their membership fees until public health restrictions were lifted. The plaintiffs also asked for sterilization of office spaces.

==== St. Bernard’s School ====
In 2020, Walden represented a group of parents of St. Bernard's School, located in New York City, in a class action lawsuit against members of the school board over the board's removal of the school headmaster and alleged financial malfeasance.

Anti-bike lane and anti-bike share cases

in 2011, Walden represented a group of Park Slope residents opposed to the installation of a two-way, protected bike lane on Prospect Park West in Brooklyn. Walden's involvement as a pro bono attorney for the group of residents was questioned. The case was dismissed by the trial judge which was affirmed on appeal. The Prospect Park West bike lane is one of the most used bike lanes in the city, with as many as 100,000 bike trips per month.

Walden also represented a group of SoHo residents trying to remove a bike share dock at Spring & Lafayette Streets in Manhattan. The lawsuit was dismissed. The bike dock at issue is in the top 30 most active bike docks in the entire NYC bike share system.

==== Computer Associates ====
In 2003, Walden represented Lloyd Silverstein, who was charged in Federal Court along with a number of other executives, with financial mismanagement at Computer Associates. As the case moved towards trial in 2004, Walden negotiated a plea arrangement with the prosecutor that helped Silverstein avoid jail time completely. In 2007, Silverstein, the former senior vice president of finance at Computer Associates, became the first executive to testify in what ultimately became a $2.2 billion accounting scandal.

==== CareCredit LLC ====
In 2013, Walden negotiated a voluntary settlement with New York Attorney General Eric Schneiderman on behalf of CareCredit LLC, a subsidiary of GE Capital Retail Bank. At the time of the inquiry, CareCredit was the largest issuer of consumer health care financing in the United States, with approximately 160,000 providers nationwide. The company was under investigation for alleged deceptive business practices.

==== TRW Deutschland Holding GmbH ====
Walden represented TRW Deutschland Holding GmbH, a global auto parts manufacturer, in connection with an international antitrust investigation spearheaded by the United States Department of Justice in 2012. TRW agreed to a favorable plea arrangement for its involvement in a conspiracy to fix prices of seat belts, airbags and steering wheels installed in cars sold in the United States.

==== Raymond Felton ====
In 2012, New York Knicks point guard Raymond Felton was arrested on two felony weapons possession charges after his estranged wife turned in a loaded gun belonging to Felton to a local police precinct. Felton had purchased the gun legally in North Carolina but never secured a permit in New York. Walden represented Felton in the matter and secured a noncustodial sentence and small fine for Felton. Felton avoided jail time.

==== Kyle O'Quinn ====
Walden was retained by New York Knicks forward Kyle O'Quinn in connection with an assault charge in 2017. Walden convinced the Manhattan DA Cyrus Vance to drop the criminal investigation against O'Quinn.

==== Colonial Management Group LLC ====
In 2014, Walden represented Colonial Management Group LLC, the managers of a 42-property portfolio under investigation by New York Attorney General Eric T. Schneiderman. The management company was under investigation for allegations of tenant harassment. Under the settlement, the owners will provide more than $1 million in rent credits to tenants living in nearly 1,700 apartments. The agreement also required that delayed maintenance projects be completed within a year and that the management company be terminated.

=== New Jersey Tax Incentive Task Force ===
On January 24, 2019, the office of New Jersey Governor Phil Murphy announced that Jim Walden was selected as Special Counsel to a Task Force assigned to investigate the tax incentive program of the state's Economic Development Agency.

During his tenure at Gibson Dunn & Crutcher and at the firm he founded, Walden brought several cases against governmental and employer overreach and abuse.

=== Mental Health Project at the Urban Justice Center ===
In conjunction with the Mental Health Project at the Urban Justice Center, Walden was the lead attorney in a 2011 class action lawsuit against five Queens, NY administrative law judges alleging bias against Social Security applicants. The judges named in the lawsuit rejected an average of 63 percent of the cases they heard in the fiscal year the lawsuit was filed, compared with a national average of 36 percent based on an analysis by the New York Times. This action resulted in a settlement agreement, wherein an estimated 4,000 applicants had their cases reheard and the five judges underwent retraining. Walden and the legal team drew praise from the National Organization of Social Security Claimants' Representatives for their efforts.

=== Harris v. Eggleston ===
Walden was also part of the legal team at Gibson Dunn, representing the plaintiffs in the class-action lawsuit Harris v. Eggleston. The lawsuit charged that thousands of people were illegally denied food stamps after they moved to receive Social Security disability payments instead of welfare benefits. The lawsuit settled in 2006 and two years later nearly 9,500 households received approximately $12 million in awards.

=== Long Island College Hospital ===
Walden was instrumental in negotiating a settlement with the State University of New York in litigation involving the sale of Long Island College Hospital. The settlement deal opened the door to keep the site a hospital and required officials to consult with unions and the community before choosing a proposal. New York City Mayor Bill de Blasio applauded Walden's efforts at a press conference where De Blasio remarked, "If there is magic in the law, Jim Walden has found it. Because we sometimes seemed out of options. And Jim Walden would typically burst into the room and come up with a new option. And they had – his options had the extraordinary tendency to work."

=== Transgender Legal Defense and Education Fund ===
While at Gibson Dunn, Walden worked with the Transgender Legal Defense and Education Fund in their representation of El'Jai Devoureau. The case was the first lawsuit to challenge the firing of a transgender person from a job where being male or female is a job qualification. The question at the heart of the case was whether someone living as a man and recognized by the government as a man was considered male in the context of employment.

=== New York City Department of Education ===
In April 2016, Walden filed a federal class-action lawsuit on behalf of a group of 11 students and their families along with the non-profit organization Families for Excellent Schools, against the New York City Department of Education. The suit alleged that the DOE and Chancellor Farina did not do enough to prevent bullying in schools and depriving students of their right to receive an education free of violence, bullying and harassment. The suit asked the city to develop improved means of addressing school violence and appoint an independent monitor to oversee the DOE's progress. At a news conference announcing the suit, Walden, stated that "We felt compelled to take action because our children are being subjected to violence, the violence is increasing, and we are seeing the tragic results almost daily."

In March 2018, the lawsuit was settled. Under the settlement, DOE was required to issue a new regulation and launch an entirely reworked system for reporting, investigating, and re-mediating bullying complaints, including by launching an electronic system so parents can track the progress of bullying investigations. The settlement also required DOE to grant a substantive new right to a safety transfer if the victim feels unsafe in the school despite other forms of remediation. Walden noted that "This settlement finally brings meaningful reform to a troubled and broken system that placed every New York City school student in dire and dangerous circumstances."

=== NYCHA ===
In February 2018, Walden filed a landmark lawsuit against the New York City Housing Authority (NYCHA) on behalf of a group of public housing residents. The suit demands that the Court impose an independent monitor over NYCHA to ensure future compliance with the law. The suit claims that NYCHA has failed to protect residents from toxic lead, failed to provide heat or hot water during bitter winter temperatures, and failed to provide economic opportunity as mandated under Section 3 of the Housing and Urban Development Act. The complaint also notes that NYCHA failed to consult with residents on significant policy changes and is negligent in safeguarding residents from hazards such as mold, vermin, roaches and malfunctioning elevators.

After Walden filed suit, he invited New York Governor Andrew Cuomo to tour a dilapidated housing project. In his invitation, Walden asked that the Governor and the state assembly declare a state of emergency to address the problems quickly. At a press conference with Walden and other elected officials outside of a public housing project in East Harlem, Cuomo accepted Walden's demands that an independent contractor be hired with state funds to repair all apartments citywide and to press the New York State Legislature for an additional $250 million to make urgent repairs.

Cuomo declared a state of emergency on April 2, 2018, allowing for the establishment of an independent monitor to oversee the distribution of $250 million in state-approved funding to quickly repair buildings operated by NYCHA. The monitor is also tasked with overseeing $350 million in funds previously pledged but not released to NYCHA. The decision created an unusually high level of friction between Cuomo and NYC Mayor Bill de Blasio following the Mayor's lack of response to the crisis. Walden "heard crickets" from City Hall when the lawsuit suit was filed. As the fallout from the lawsuit continued, the chairwoman of NYCHA, Shola Olatoye, was forced to resign and the judge overseeing the case ordered a preliminary injunction, forcing the New York City Housing Authority to immediately complete lead inspections inside thousands of apartments housing children.

=== District Attorneys Association of the State of New York ===
In October 2018, Walden filed a lawsuit on behalf of the District Attorneys Association of the State of New York (DAASNY). The complaint, which names Governor Andrew Cuomo and others as defendants, claims that a law signed by Cuomo to establish a panel to probe accusations of prosecutorial misconduct is unconstitutional. The bill, S2412D, passed through the New York Legislature in June 2018, creates the Commission of Prosecutorial Conduct and authorizes the commission to “receive, initiate, investigate and hear complaints with respect to the conduct, qualifications, fitness to perform, or performance of official duties of any prosecutor, and may determine that a prosecutor be admonished, censured or removed from office.”

The lawsuit claimed that the creation of the Commission of Prosecutorial Conduct violates, among other provisions, the separation of powers doctrine between the three branches of state government by giving the Legislature and Court of Appeals power over district attorneys, who are executive officials.

On January 28, 2020, the New York Supreme Court issued an opinion declaring the Commission on Prosecutorial Misconduct to be unconstitutional. Walden represented the DAASNY pro bono.

=== Donald Trump 2020 presidential campaign defamation ===
In December 2020, Walden was hired to represent Chris Krebs, former Director of the Cybersecurity and Infrastructure Security Agency, who was fired by President Trump after Krebs’ agency released a statement declaring the 2020 United States presidential election was the “most secure in American history." Shortly after he was fired, Trump campaign lawyer Joseph diGenova stated on Newsmax TV that Krebs “should be drawn and quartered. Taken out at dawn and shot.” The lawsuit was filed against diGenova, the Trump campaign, and Newsmax, alleging "defamation, intentional infliction of emotional distress, aiding and abetting, and civil conspiracy". In April 2021, diGenova issued a public apology to Krebs.

=== New York State Assembly redistricting maps ===
In May 2022, Walden filed a lawsuit on behalf of Gary Greenberg, a New York Democratic activist, requesting that the election date for the New York Assembly be delayed from June 28 until August 23 to allow time for redrawing voting districts after the districts were deemed unlawful in an earlier court ruling. The suit would also invalidate petitions submitted by existing candidates for any office if those petitions contained signatories falling outside of the newly drawn districts, and would reopen a petitioning period for every race to allow new candidates to seek office based on the new districts. On May 16, 2022, the lawsuit was filed with the Court of Appeals, and petitioners included Greenberg, New York gubernatorial candidate Paul Nichols, and Gavin M. Wax, president of the New York Young Republican Club. Walden represented the petitioners pro bono.

On June 10, 2022, the court affirmed that the maps were unconstitutional, however the request for a delay of the 2022 Assembly Primary elections was denied and subsequently appealed.

=== The Geraldine Santoro Act ===
In response to the US Supreme Court’s Dobbs v. Jackson Women's Health Organization decision in 2022, Walden drafted legislation that would provide financial assistance to women from states where abortion is banned to travel to New York for abortion healthcare services. The Geraldine Santoro Act was introduced by New York Assemblymember Charles Lavine in May 2022.

=== U.S. v. Mark Hazelwood, et al ===
Walden was hired as legal counsel to Mark Hazelwood, the former president of Pilot Flying J, in a criminal case stemming from a federal investigation into a diesel fuel discount program, which prosecutors claim was designed to defraud trucking companies doing business with Pilot Flying J. Hazelwood maintained his innocence and went to trial. In February 2018, while represented by previous trial counsel, Hazelwood was found guilty for his alleged role in the scheme on charges of wire fraud, witness tampering and conspiracy to commit wire fraud. Taking the case after conviction, Walden found exculpatory evidence and filed a motion for a new trial, which the trial judge denied. Hazelwood faced up to twenty years in prison, but Walden argued for leniency, presenting evidence that the alleged criminal activity had no financial impact on Pilot's customers. At Hazelwood’s sentencing, the judge credited the mitigating evidence, granted Walden's request for a more lenient sentence, and imposed a term of 12 1/2 years. Walden vowed to appeal the conviction. When the district judge ordered Hazelwood to surrender to jail despite his appeal, an appellate court reversed that ruling.

The appellate court later reversed Hazelwood’s conviction. On remand to the trial court, Walden moved for the disqualification of the district judge, and moved to change venue in light of the substantial negative local press coverage. On the eve of Walden filing a motion to dismiss based on prosecutorial misconduct at the first trial, the Department of Justice dismissed all charges with prejudice. Walden issued the following public statement: “Mark Hazelwood’s nightmare is now over. We believed in his innocence from day one. We are gratified that the Department of Justice agreed that dismissal was the only appropriate remedy. We look forward to seeing the next chapter of Mark’s life, surrounded by his wife Joanne and his loving family, and are honored to have been able to tell his whole story in full truth. Mark is innocent.” The District Judge signed the dismissal order on July 28, 2021.

=== Representation of Brittany Kaiser ===
Walden represents Brittany Kaiser, the former director of business development for SCL Group, the parent company of Cambridge Analytica. Kaiser acted as a whistleblower about her knowledge of the Facebook–Cambridge Analytica data scandal which exposed more than 87 million Facebook accounts to abuse and may have impacted the outcome of the 2016 US presidential campaign. She is alleged to have discussed the 2016 US Presidential Election with Julian Assange of WikiLeaks in 2017, which Walden denies.

=== Representation of Grigory Rodchenkov ===
Walden was the attorney for Grigory Rodchenkov, the former director of Russia's national anti-doping laboratory. Rodchenkov's role as a whistle-blower helped expose Russia's state-sponsored doping program. Crucially, Rodchenkov kept a contemporaneous diary that included entries related to the doping system he oversaw. The diaries detailed specific discussions about cheating that Rodchenkov conducted with prominent Russian officials. The International Olympic Committee banned Russia from the 2018 Winter Olympics The Netflix documentary Icarus included a brief appearance by Walden discussing how Rodchenkov's life is in danger following his revelations about Russian doping.

In 2018, Walden criticized the Court of Arbitration for Sport for reinstating 28 Russian athletes who had appealed their lifetime bans on competition. Walden called the decision a "mockery" that disregarded key evidence, writing: "The millions of dollars spent by the WADA and the IOC to gather and assemble proof of the Russian doping system appear to have been for nothing: The CAS panel brushed it all aside with the stroke of a pen." Walden also criticized IOC president Thomas Bach's subsequent decision to reinstate the Russian Olympic Committee, calling the move "cowardice and appeasement."

In February 2018, Walden testified before the U.S. Helsinki Commission to discuss global corruption in international sport and, specifically, the efforts by Russia to circumvent doping testing. Walden said that the World Anti-Doping Agency and the International Olympic Committee need to step up their efforts to enforce doping regulations and restore integrity to the international athletic community. Walden underscored the importance of protecting whistleblowers to encourage future transparency in global competition. In July 2018, Walden again testified before the Helsinki Commission, saying that Putin had created a "gangster state" in Russia.

In February 2018, Russian oligarch Mikhail Prokhorov, the controlling owner of the Brooklyn Nets basketball team, agreed to finance a defamation lawsuit in New York against Rodchenkov. The suit claims that Rodchenkov defamed three Russian biathletes — Olga Zaitseva, Yana Romanova and Olga Vilukhina — when Rodchenkov included them on a list of athletes who took performance-enhancing drugs as part of a state-controlled program that corrupted the 2014 Winter Olympics in Sochi, Russia. The women, who were stripped of the silver medal they won as part of a relay team, are seeking $10 million each in damages.

In April 2018, Walden counter-sued Prokhorov on behalf of Rodchenkov under New York's anti-SLAPP law, claiming that Prokhorov's suit was frivolous and intended to limit an individual's right to exercise their First Amendment rights to free speech. According to published reports, the counter-suit is likely to seek the names of other individuals who are financing the lawsuit against Rodchenkov as well as information about the assets of Prokhorov. Walden stated that he believes Prokhorov's lawsuit was intentionally designed to uncover Rodchenkov's whereabouts in the United States and allow agents of the Russian government to find him.

Walden has been highly critical of WADA's efforts to properly reprimand Russia for that country's decades-old state-sponsored sports doping program. In September 2018, WADA announced that it would be lifting the ban on Russia's participation in international sporting competition. Walden called the decision "the greatest treachery against clean athletes in Olympic history." Walden has suggested that the United States is wasting its money funding for WADA because the organization "is obviously impotent to address Russia's state-sponsored doping."`

== 2025 New York City mayoral campaign ==
In late October 2024, Walden announced that he was running to be Mayor of New York City in the upcoming 2025 New York City mayoral election as an independent candidate. He was named on City & State 2025 "NYC Power 100" list alongside other mayoral candidates. He had previously supported Kathryn Garcia in the 2021 Democratic mayoral primary. In early 2025, he met with city Republican leaders to discuss potentially seeking the Republican nomination, but Walden ended discussions and decided to run as an independent after the Trump administration ordered Justice Department prosecutors to dismiss all federal corruption charges against incumbent Mayor Eric Adams.

Walden positioned himself as an apolitical technocrat in the mold of former Mayor Michael Bloomberg, and as a centrist, who identifies as left-leaning socially and right-leaning fiscally. His platform included a citywide Department of Public Integrity, achieving net zero carbon emissions, and expanding police presence on streets and in the subway. Walden advocated abolishing the Civilian Complaint Review Board (CCRB) and replacing it with "a truly independent and empowered agency" that would be more effective at addressing serious police misconduct, while improving due process protections for officers.

Walden's supporters included the NYC Organization of Public Service Retirees, which represents retired firefighters, transit workers, and other municipal employees. He was also endorsed by the NYPD Retired Sergeants Association and by former Manhattan District Attorney Cyrus Vance Jr. A group of 58 former federal and local prosecutors also endorsed him, including Richard Donoghue, the former U.S. Attorney for the Eastern District of New York; the group cited experience as a federal prosecutor and his "good government" work. Another ally was former Democratic Governor David Paterson, a longtime friend and paid consultant for the campaign, who served as chief strategist, but was fired a few weeks into the campaign after telling a news outlet that Walden was “not a factor at this point” in the mayoral race. Walden entered the race with significant legal and political experience, but little name recognition. Journalist and political science researcher Christina Greer commented after interviewing Walden that "There is absolutely no way in my estimation that someone with that type of temperament can and should lead the city of New York."

Walden sought to run on the ballot line of the Independence Party of New York, which was created in 1991 and disbanded in 2020. In January 2025, Walden sued the New York City Board of Elections to challenge a New York law that prohibits the use of the words "Independent" or "Independence" on a ballot line. In April 2025, the court declined to issue a preliminary injunction blocking the law. As of June 2025, Walden's ballot line was planned to be labelled as being with the "Integrity Party".

In his campaign's first reporting period, Walden raised $630,000. In the prior reporting period, of October 7, 2024, only incumbent Mayor Eric Adams and ex-City Comptroller Scott Stringer had a cash balance greater than Walden's current total, which includes a sum of his own money in his campaign account. In June 2025, he became the first independent candidate for mayor to receive matching funds.

Walden proposed on July 3 that he, Adams, Curtis Sliwa, and Andrew Cuomo pledge to abide by the results of a poll in September 2025, such that the weakest candidates will drop out and unite behind the strongest to defeat Zohran Mamdani in the general election. A mid-July 2025 poll of registered NYC voters found that half of the respondents did not know enough about Walden to decide whether they would consider voting for him, and 40% would not consider voting for him.

Walden dropped out of the race on September 2, and proposed uniting the field of candidates into a "one-on-one race" against the Democratic nominee, Zohran Mamdani, accusing him of "extreme bigotry toward police, his authentic commitment to communism, his antisemitic obsessions, and his sympathies for terrorists". As of his campaign termination, Walden's campaign had spent over $2 million.

=== Result ===
2025 New York City mayoral election
Party	Candidate	Votes	%	±%
Democratic	Zohran Mamdani	944,950	43.07%	−22.12%
Working Families	Zohran Mamdani	169,234	7.71%	N/A
Total	Zohran Mamdani	1,114,184	50.78%	−16.21%
Fight and Deliver	Andrew Cuomo	906,614	41.32%	N/A
Republican	Curtis Sliwa	143,305	6.53%	−20.37%
Protect Animals	Curtis Sliwa	10,444	0.48%	N/A
Total	Curtis Sliwa	153,749	7.01%	−19.89%
Safe&Affordable/EndAntiSemitism	Eric Adams (incumbent) (withdrawn)	6,897	0.31%	N/A
Conservative	Irene Estrada	2,856	0.13%	−0.99%
Integrity	Jim Walden (withdrawn)	2,319	0.11%	N/A
Quality of Life	Joseph Hernandez	1,379	0.06%	N/A
Write-in		6,206	0.28%	−0.34%
Total votes		2,194,204	100%	
Democratic hold				

== Post Campaign Career ==
After ending his race for Mayor, Walden rejoined his law firm. He sat for an interview about his return to the law, as well as lessons learned from his candidacy. Walden described the ways in which he was unprepared for the campaign trail, including from a confidence perspective: “Throughout my litigation career, my confidence as a speaker rarely failed. Not so on the campaign trail. Despite my belief in my policy positions, I worried people would view me the way I often view politicians: transactional and inauthentic. It was an obstacle I had to overcome.”

=== Fight Over Rent Deregulation ===
Walden represented Peak Capital Advisors and the owners of 31 previously rent-stabilized buildings in a fight against New York Attorney General Letitia James. James claimed that Peak and the building owners “illegally deregulated” the 31 buildings, demanding that the 150 units be re-regulated. James’ suit came six days after Peak filed a federal action claiming James’ action were unconstitutional and amounted to an illegal “taking” of the properties by retroactively apply new rules to already completed buildings, which had been substantially renovated and thus exempted from the rent-regulation laws.

The case garnered broad support from the Real Estate industry after, Woody Pascal, a former state official from DHCR, the agency with regulatory oversight over the deregulation program, filed an affidavit agreeing that James’ suit was applying new rules to already completed projects in violation of law. According to one outlet, who blamed both James and New York Governor Kathy Hochul for failing to put the brakes on the lawsuit, “Their goal is not merely to stop the loss of rent-stabilized apartments, but to reverse it. If they succeed, it could wipe out landlords’ investments in hundreds of buildings — and give their high-income tenants cheap rents for the rest of their lives.” Commentators also stressed the high stakes for the real estate industry, even beyond the 31 targeted buildings: “If the courts allow DHCR’s stricter interpretation to stand, they will set a precedent that no DHCR operational bulletin or directive, past or present, provides a reliable guarantee for developers or investors. This would open the door to executive overreach: DHCR could arbitrarily decide to go after developers who are abiding by the rules as written and previously interpreted. The result would be complete paralysis.” The Pascal affidavit, which industry insiders described as a “bombshell” in the litigation, spawned a separate fight, as James’ office tried to keep it under seal, which would prevent the public from seeing the official’s allegations.

=== Fight Over E-bikes De-Criminalization ===
Walden represented a city-wide group of pedestrians in a lawsuit aimed at nullifying Mayor Mamdani’s policy against criminal enforcement against e-bike drivers. In announcing the suit, Walden said, “No mayor has the power to suspend the laws the City Council and state Legislature passed to keep New Yorkers safe – yet that is exactly what this directive does, turning our sidewalks and crosswalks into a lawless free-for-all.” The suit sought to restore the power of NYPD to issue criminal summonses for simple traffic violation given the increase in pedestrian injuries and emergency-room admissions, arguing that “the absence of any meaningful regulation or oversight corresponds with a dramatic rise in fatalities, catastrophic injuries and reckless driving, endangering e-bike drivers themselves and the public at large.” Walden explained the context at a rally in front of City Hall: “Commissioner Tisch had the good sense, the experience, has studied the catastrophe pedestrians are facing in our city by racing, reckless e-bikes . . . It was because of her considered judgment and experience that she decided NYPD officers needed to issue criminal summonses to bikes that speed along pedestrian sidewalks, breeze the wrong way on one-way streets and blow through red lights and stop signs,” Walden said. “Since Mamdani overturned the decision of the commissioner in March of this year, things have gotten worse.”

=== Vickie Paladino case ===
Walden represented New York City Council Member Vickie Paladino after the Council accused her of breaking council workplace rules based on tweets she made on her private social media accounts. Walden filed suit, alleging that the disciplinary charges violated Paladino’s free-speech rights. Walden sought to enjoin a hearing on the charges, saying the City Council “cannot police private speech.” The Council countered that Paladino’s tweets, even over her private accounts, violated Council's anti-discrimination and harassment rules given the Islamaphobic nature of the tweets. The suit asked the Court to reject the Council’s position, saying, “The sole basis for the charge against [Paladino] is core political speech protected by the First Amendment . . . Writing and posting the Tweets required no use of Council resources. None of the Tweets were directed to — or even mentioned — current Council members or staff. None of the Tweets pertained to Council business. All were personal advocacy on matters of public importance.” At an initial proceeding, the Judge, Sabrina Kraus, directed the parties to settle the case, warning that she was “prepared to make a ruling within a few days if the parties can’t strike a deal.” In light of the Court’s reaction, the parties settled the case, which required the Council to drop its charges and Paladino to make modifications to her social-media accounts and issue a public statement. Paladino issued a public statement calling the settlement a “win” but clarifying her intentions: “The disciplinary charge against me has been withdrawn and I withdrew my lawsuit. To be clear, my personal social-media posts were not directed at any Council Member or staff.”
