= Richard McLaren (academic) =

Law professor

Richard McLaren OC
- Born: Richard Henry McLaren; 1945 (age 80–81)
- Occupations: lawyer, professor
- Known for: McLaren Report

Academic background
- Education: University of Western Ontario; University of London

Academic work
- Discipline: Sports law, bankruptcy, insolvency and business law
- Institutions: University of Western Ontario

Richard Henry McLaren OC (born 1945) is a law professor at Western University in Ontario, Canada, specializing in sports law. In 2015, he was one of the three members of the WADA Commission, an independent panel commissioned by the World Anti-Doping Agency to investigate allegations of state-sponsored doping in Russian sports. He was awarded the Order of Canada with the grade of officer in 2015.

== Early life and education ==
From 1964-1968, McLaren attended Huron University College at the University of Western Ontario for his undergraduate education. During this time he lived at O'Neil Residence. At 1968 he graduated with an Honors Business Administration degree. After that he earned LL.B. from the law school of the same university. and received a Master of Laws degree from the University of London. He was called to the Bar in Ontario in 1974.

== Career ==
In 1979 McLaren, then a professor at the University of Western Ontario Law School, directed a project which studied privacy and security issues involved in the new (at the time) electronic transfer of funds.

McLaren is a member of the international Court of Arbitration for Sport. In 2000 he investigated coverup of steroid use by American track athletes at the Olympics in Sydney, and published a report.

In 2007 McLaren participated in an investigation into drug use in Major League Baseball.

In 2014, McLaren founded McLaren Global Sport Solutions, which consults with sport organizations about ethical issues.

In 2020, McLaren was appointed as the Integrity Officer to FIBA.

=== McLaren Report ===
In July 2016, McLaren presented the report of the WADA Commission in Toronto, Ontario, indicating systematic state-sponsored subversion of the drug testing processes by the government of Russia before, during, and subsequent to the 2014 Sochi Winter Olympics. McLaren stated that the report was not intended to determine individual guilt but rather "whether there was a system in Sochi and also in the Moscow lab, and if there was, how did it operate?"

On 9 December 2016, McLaren published the second part of his independent report. The investigation found that from 2011 to 2015, more than 1,000 Russian competitors in various sports (including summer, winter, and Paralympic sports) benefited from the cover-up.

=== Other Reports ===
==== International Weightlifting Federation Corruption Report ====
In June 2020, McLaren released his report on the International Weightlifting Federation in which he claimed that the Federation's President, Tamás Aján, was corrupt. The report laid out details of vote buying and bribes by Aján and other IWF officials as well as doping tests that were covered up and over $10 million of missing money. The report led to Aján being charged with complicity by the International Testing Agency as well as other high ranking weightlifting officials Nicu Vlad and Hasan Akkus.

==== Olympic Boxing Result Manipulation Report ====
In September 2021, McLaren released his report on the International Boxing Association. His report found that at least 11 fights at the boxing tournament at the 2016 Olympics has suspicious outcomes and were possibly rigged and that the then-president Wu Ching-Kuo and executive director Karim Bouzidi were ultimately responsible. The report also claimed that a 'six figure' bribe was offered to fix one of the bouts and that the French boxing team had favouritism during the tournament due to Bouzidi being French.
