= Moscow Anti-Doping Laboratory =

Russian anti-doping laboratory

The Moscow Anti-Doping Laboratory is a Russian national analytical laboratory detecting doping in biological fluids or tissues of athletes.

The laboratory was created as a Soviet national anti-doping laboratory in 1971. The laboratory was a part of the All-Union Scientific Research Institute of Physical Culture based in Moscow. The first head of the Laboratory was Alexey Ivanovich Shaev. Then the long-term head of the laboratory was Vitaly Aleksandrovich Semyonov. The laboratory received accreditation from the IOC and the right to analyze samples taken at the world's largest competitions, including the Olympic Games, on July 7, 1980. In 2005, Grigory Mikhailovich Rodchenkov became the acting director of the Laboratory. On July 6, 2006, Rodchenkov was appointed director of this organization. He remained in this position until November 11, 2015, when he was forced to resign due to a doping scandal.

Until December 2015, the laboratory existed in the form of a federal state unitary enterprise. In December 2015, it was transformed into a federal state budgetary institution, the founder of which is the Ministry of Sports. On October 11, 2016, Russian President Vladimir Putin announced that Moscow State University would coordinate the laboratory's work.
