= Grigory Rodchenkov =

Former Russian doping executive (born 1958)

- Born: 24 October 1958 (age 68); Moscow, Russian SFSR, Soviet Union
- Education: Moscow State University
- Awards: Order of Friendship
- Scientific career
- Thesis: Хромато-масс-спектрометрический анализ кортикостероидов в биологических объектах (Chromatographic mass spectrometric analysis of corticosteroids in biological samples) (1990)
- Doctoral advisor: Victor Uralets

Grigory Mikhailovich Rodchenkov (Russian: Григорий Михайлович Родченков; born 24 October 1958) is a former head of Russia's national anti-doping laboratory, the Anti-Doping Center. Rodchenkov is known for his involvement in the state-run doping program in Russia.

In November 2015, the Independent Commission of the World Anti-Doping Agency (WADA) determined Rodchenkov was "at the heart of the positive drug test coverup", and that he had been directly involved with concealing positive tests and destroying 1,417 urine samples. Rodchenkov made headlines in 2016 after an interview to The New York Times exposing the doping program in Russia. Rodchenkov said he developed a three-drug cocktail of banned substances that he mixed with liquor and provided to dozens of athletes at the Sochi Olympics. Rodchenkov's allegations were confirmed by the independent McLaren Report, leading to Russia's partial bans from the 2016 Summer Olympics and 2018 Winter Olympics. Since the revelations became public, Rodchenkov has been living in hiding, under witness protection.

Rodchenkov and his connections to Russian doping were the subject of the 2017 Netflix documentary Icarus, which won the Academy Award for Best Documentary Feature at the 90th Oscars ceremony.

In 2023, the United States authorized the Rodchenkov Act which seeks to identify and sanction individuals involved in doping at major international sporting events if American companies are involved in sponsoring those events or the American financial system is utilized by the organizers.

== Life and career ==
Rodchenkov was born in Moscow. His mother worked as a doctor at Kremlin Hospital (now Central Clinical Hospital). Throughout school he was involved in athletics and during his studies he was a member of the MSU national team and met the standard of the Master of Sports in Athletics. Rodchenkov graduated from Moscow State University and received his PhD in chemistry with a focus on chemical kinetics and catalysis. In 1985, he started working at the Moscow Anti-Doping Centre. In 1986, he worked at the 1986 Goodwill Games in Moscow and co-discovered 14 positive samples, including those of sprinter Ben Johnson. However, the announcement was not made because the sports and party leaders of the USSR did not want to cause a scandal.

Rodchenkov later described the Soviet Union's state-sponsored doping program served as a model for Russia's program in the 21st century, with Vladimir Putin merely continuing what Joseph Stalin started. In 1994, he moved to Interlab. When he returned to Russia, he worked for different petrochemical companies. He joined the Anti-Doping Centre in Calgary for the 1988 Winter Olympics. From July 2006 until November 2015 he worked as the director of the Anti-Doping Center, then Russia's only laboratory accredited by WADA.

=== Doping investigation in 2011 ===
In 2011, Russian authorities opened an investigation against Rodchenkov's sister, champion runner Marina Rodchenkova, for buying and possessing banned drugs that she admitted she had intended to supply to athletes. Rodchenkov was also arrested in relation to this investigation and questioned on suspicion of sourcing and selling banned drugs. He was placed in a psychiatric hospital for schizotypal personality disorder following a suicide attempt after charges were filed against him. Charges against him were eventually dropped, but his sister was convicted in December 2012 and given a suspended sentence.

At the time, Rodchenkov was the director of Russia's national anti-doping laboratory. In June/July 2013, British journalist Nick Harris informed the International Olympic Committee (IOC) and WADA about this criminal drug case and suspicions of Rodchenkov's involvement, but this information was apparently ignored. Rodchenkov claims he was not jailed by Russian authorities in 2012 because they had earmarked him to dope their athletes at the 2014 Winter Olympics in Sochi.

=== Doping scandal after 2014 ===
In 2015 the WADA Independent Commission (IC) made numerous accusations against Rodchenkov. The IC established Rodchenkov "not only accepted, but also requested money" from athletes in order to conceal their positive test results. "Rodchenkov had personally instructed and authorized the disposal of 1,417 samples" prior to the arrival in Moscow of a WADA audit team, which "directly defied and violated the WADA directives". In addition, "Rodchenkov instructed that all records showing the existence of the samples, as well as any documentation of the resulting analysis, be destroyed." Rodchenkov later admitted he destroyed the samples on purpose in order to limit the extent of WADA's audit. The IC report concluded Rodchenkov was "at the heart of the positive drug test coverup".

Shortly after release of the IC report, WADA suspended the Moscow Antidoping Center, which Rodchenkov had headed since 2006. In January 2016, fearing for his safety, Rodchenkov boarded a flight from Moscow to Los Angeles. He settled in the United States and entered the witness protection program. Two major Russian anti-doping executives, Vyacheslav Sinev and Rodchenkov's friend Nikita Kamaev, unexpectedly died in the months after the doping scandal started.

Rodchenkov discussed doping at the Sochi Olympics with whistle-blower Vitaly Stepanov, who recorded 15 hours of their conversations without Rodchenkov's knowledge. Rodchenkov also gave details to The New York Times, alleging that Russia's Federal Security Service (FSB, previously KGB) was involved in covering up positive doping samples. In July 2016, the McLaren Report, an independent investigation commissioned by WADA, found corroborating evidence after conducting witness interviews, reviewing thousands of documents, cyber analysis of hard drives, forensic analysis of urine-sample collection bottles, and laboratory analysis of individual athlete samples, with "more evidence becoming available by the day". The Moscow laboratory "operated under State oversight and control" and "personnel were required to be part of the State directed system that enabled Russian athletes to compete while engaging in the use of doping substances."

On 9 December 2016 McLaren published the second part of his independent report. The investigation found that from at least 2011 to 2015, more than 1,000 Russian competitors in various sports (including summer, winter, and Paralympic sports) benefited from the cover-up. Emails indicate they included five blind powerlifters, who may have been given drugs without their knowledge, and a fifteen-year-old.

According to McLaren's summary of the evidence provided by Rodchenkov, a key aspect of the doping scheme was the creation and use of a so-called "Sochi Duchess List". This list contained the names of 37 Russian athletes "whose samples were to be automatically swapped for their own clean urine stored in the FSB Command Center at Sochi". Those athletes' samples needed to be swapped because the athletes "had been authorised to use the cocktail of oxandrolone, methenolone and trenbolone during the Games". The Russian Olympic Committee insists the Duchess List is nothing more than a competition schedule, which was prepared ahead of the Sochi Games for the purpose of identifying potential medallists.

During arbitration between Alexander Legkov and the International Olympic Committee (IOC), the IOC submitted that "Dr. Rodchenkov's account of events is truthful and accurate", stating:

- Since Dr Rodchenkov is no longer in Russia, he is now able to speak honestly with less fear of the consequences than if he had chosen to describe the existence and detail of the scheme while he was in Russia.
- Dr Rodchenkov's statements are precise and clear. They are also very consistent and contain "no contradictions" among the various elements of his account.
- Dr Rodchenkov provided detailed information concerning particular athletes only when he appears to have specific information relating to those athletes. In many cases, he simply mentions the athlete's presence on the Duchess List and the objective consequence of this, without seeking to add specific details.
- On every occasion when other evidence has been available, that evidence has "systematically corroborated" Dr Rodchenkov's account.

According to the IOC, minor inconsistencies in his testimony were considered unimportant. For example, the Duchess Cocktail which he developed was originally described in writing as a mixture of trenbolone, oxandrolone, and methasterone; it was subsequently described as containing metenolone, not methasterone. Rodchenkov stated the word "methasterone" in the original was a "typographical error".

Rodchenkov stated he personally had never distributed the Duchess Cocktail, had never seen an athlete take the mixture or instruction being given either to athletes or to coaches to use the substance, and had never seen an athlete give a clear urine sample or "tamper with a doping sample". Rodchenkov also stated: (a) he "never observed first hand any bottles being opened or de-capped"; (b) accordingly, he did not know the "precise method" used to open the bottles; but (c) he did see a "table with instruments that resembled a dentist's tools".

According to the Arbitral Award in the arbitration between Alexander Legkov, Russia and the IOC, Rodchenkov's statement is called "a bare assertion which is uncorroborated by any contemporaneous documentary evidence. As such, the probative weight of this evidence is limited and the Panel is unable to find based on such evidence that the Athlete committed an ADRV" (anti-doping rule violation).

== Reactions ==
Following the 2014 Winter Olympics in Sochi, Russian President Vladimir Putin awarded Rodchenkov the Order of Friendship. In 2016, after the doping allegations were widely reported, Putin called Rodchenkov a "man with a scandalous reputation".

The McLaren Report stated Rodchenkov was "an integral part of the conspiracy to extort money from athletes in order to cover up positive doping test results." It also found that Rodchenkov was truthful with respect to the subject matter under investigation.

In November 2017, an IOC panel concluded: "Whatever his motivation may be and whichever wrongdoing he may have committed in the past, Dr Rodchenkov was telling the truth when he provided explanations of the cover-up scheme that he managed".

On 5 December 2017, it was announced Russia would compete as Olympic Athletes from Russia under a neutral flag at the 2018 Winter Olympics. Following the announcement, Jim Walden, an attorney for Rodchenkov, issued a statement applauding the decision by the IOC that sends "a powerful message that it will not tolerate state-sponsored cheating by any nation".

As the world has seen, Dr Rodchenkov provided credible and irrefutable evidence of the Russian state-sponsored doping system," Walden said in a statement. "Russia's consistent denials lack any credibility, and its failure to produce all evidence in its possession only further confirms its high-level complicity.

Russia's doping program and Rodchenkov's work were highlighted in testimony before the U.S. Helsinki Commission (also known as the Commission on Security and Cooperation in Europe) in Washington, DC, on 22 February 2018. During that hearing, Walden discussed Rodchenkov's work in detail and suggested the World Anti-Doping Agency and the International Olympic Committee needed to do more to restore integrity to international sport.

Despite the information presented in the McLaren Report, Russia was reinstated by the IOC after the conclusion of the 2018 Games. In an editorial published in the American newspaper USA Today, Rodchenkov expressed his dismay at the decision, calling it "catastrophic". His lawyer, Jim Walden, issued a statement on behalf of Rodchenkov saying the decision to reinstate Russia is "the greatest treachery against clean athletes in Olympic history". Rodchenkov continues to fear for his life and remains in hiding under protective custody.

=== In Russia ===
Russian state-owned news agency TASS reported that sports minister Pavel Kolobkov said the investigative committee found no evidence to support the state operated a doping system. That committee seeks Rodchenkov's extradition from the United States, where he is in witness protection. Despite assertions from Russian officials that no system existed, "empirical evidence is totally to the contrary", IOC member Dick Pound said, adding, "so I think what we're seeing in the Russian press is for domestic consumption".

=== Lawsuit by Mikhail Prokhorov ===
Following Russia's banning from the 2018 Winter Olympics and the stripping of medals from multiple Russian athletes, Russian oligarch Mikhail Prokhorov, at the time the controlling owner of the Brooklyn Nets basketball team, agreed to finance a defamation lawsuit in New York against Rodchenkov. The suit claims Rodchenkov defamed three Russian biathletes — Olga Zaytseva, Yana Romanova and Olga Vilukhina — when Rodchenkov included them on a list of athletes who took performance-enhancing drugs as part of a state-controlled program that corrupted the 2014 Winter Olympics in Sochi, Russia. The women, who were stripped of the silver medal they won as part of a relay team, are seeking $10 million each in damages.

In April 2018, Rodchenkov, through his lawyer, Jim Walden, countersued Prokhorov under New York's anti-SLAPP law, claiming that Prokhorov's suit was frivolous and intended to limit individuals from exercising their First Amendment rights to free speech. According to published reports, the countersuit is likely to seek the names of other individuals who are financing the lawsuit against Rodchenkov as well as information about the assets of Prokhorov.

"Prokhorov has assets here," Walden said. "We need to go about expeditiously securing them, so he doesn't go about taking them out of the country. You can expect that's what we're going to be looking at next."

Walden stated that he believes Prokhorov's lawsuit was intentionally designed to uncover Rodchenkov's whereabouts in the United States and allow agents of the Russian government to find him.

== Icarus ==
Rodchenkov was featured in the 2017 Netflix documentary Icarus, directed by Bryan Fogel. In Icarus, Rodchenkov describes his involvement in a conspiracy to help Russian athletes to beat doping tests in the Olympic Games. On 4 March 2018, Icarus won an Academy Award for Best Documentary Feature.

== William Hill Sports Book of the Year ==
Rodchenkov was the 2020 winner of the William Hill Sports Book of the Year for his book The Rodchenkov Affair: How I Brought Down Putin's Secret Doping Empire. He was, however, unable to collect the £30,000 prize money as he has been placed under a witness protection scheme in the United States.

== Bibliography ==
- Rodchenkov, Grigory (2020). The Rodchenkov Affair: How I Brought Down Russia's Secret Doping Empire (Hardback). London: WH Allen. ISBN 978-0-75355-332-9.
