= McLaren Report =

Independent report of doping in Russia

The McLaren Report (Russian: Доклад Макларена) is the name given to an independent report released in two parts by professor Richard McLaren into allegations and evidence of state-sponsored doping in Russia. It was commissioned by the World Anti-Doping Agency (WADA) in May 2016. In July 2016, McLaren presented the first part of the report, indicating systematic state-sponsored subversion of the drug testing processes by the government of Russia during and subsequent to the 2014 Winter Olympics in Sochi, Russia. In December 2016, he published the second part of the report on doping in Russia.

== July 2016 report (part 1) ==
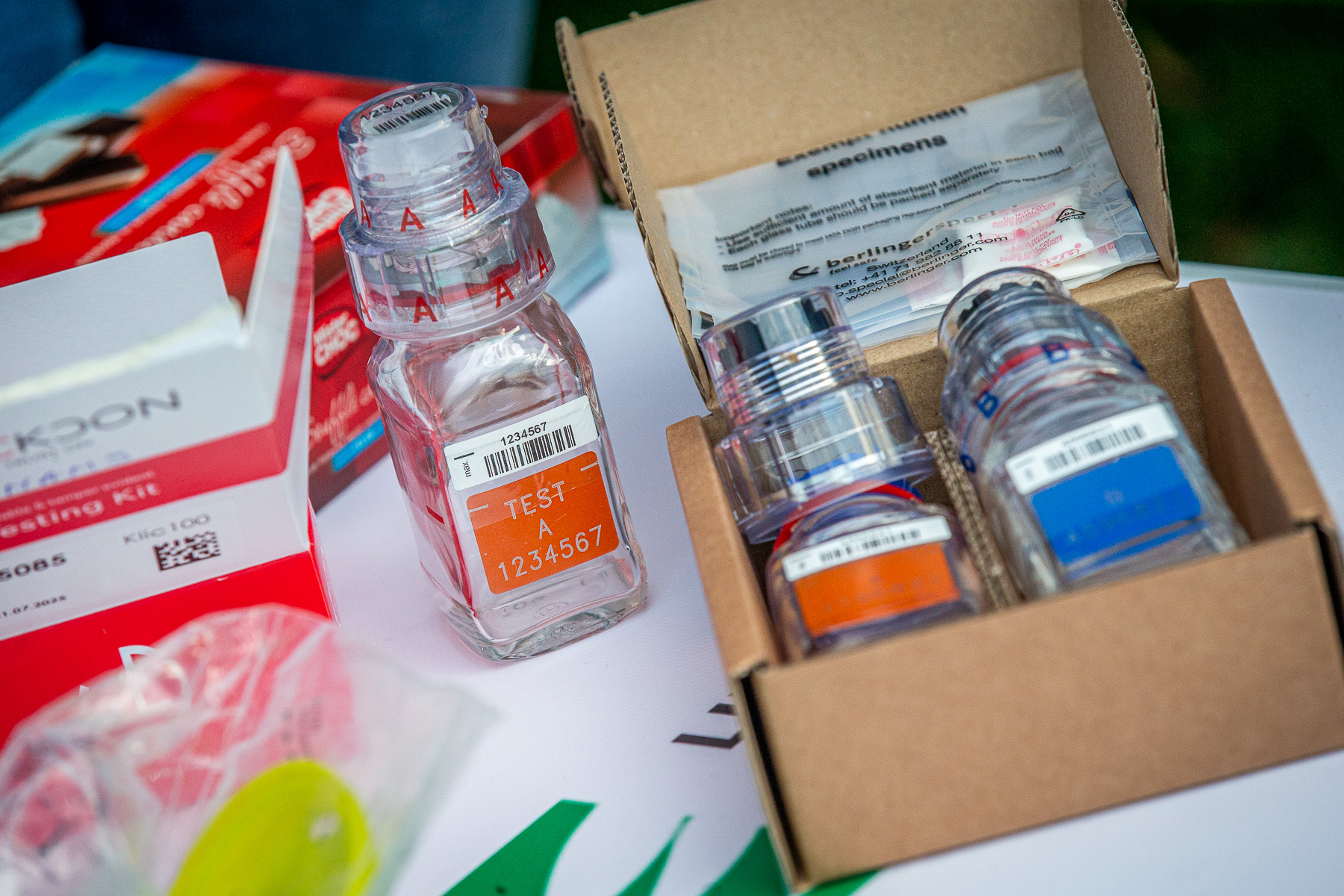
BEREG KIT doping sample collecting bottles

On 18 July 2016, Richard McLaren, a Canadian attorney retained by WADA to investigate Grigory Rodchenkov's allegations, published a 97-page report covering significant state-sponsored doping in Russia. Although limited by a 57-day time frame, the investigation found corroborating evidence after conducting witness interviews, reviewing thousands of documents, cyber analysis of hard drives, forensic analysis of urine sample collection bottles, and laboratory analysis of individual athlete samples, with "more evidence becoming available by the day."

The report concluded that it was shown "beyond a reasonable doubt" that Russia's Ministry of Sport, the Centre of Sports Preparation of the National Teams of Russia, the Federal Security Service (FSB), and the WADA-accredited laboratory in Moscow had "operated for the protection of doped Russian athletes" within a "state-directed failsafe system" using "the disappearing positive [test] methodology." McLaren stated that urine samples were opened in Sochi in order to swap them "without any evidence to the untrained eye".

At the Olympics, urine samples are stored in security bottles named the "BEREG-KIT", which must be broken open after being closed; the investigation, however, found that using a specific tool, the bottles were possible to open, and found scratch marks on the inside normally invisible to the naked eye. The official producer of BEREG-KIT security bottles used for anti-doping tests, Berlinger Group, stated, "We have no knowledge of the specifications, the methods or the procedures involved in the tests and experiments conducted by the McLaren Commission."

According to the McLaren report, the Disappearing Positive Methodology (DPM) operated from "at least late 2011 to August 2015." It was used on 643 positive samples, a number that the authors consider "only a minimum" due to limited access to Russian records.

- Athletics (139)
- Weightlifting (117)
- Non-Olympic sports (37)
- Paralympic sport (35)
- Wrestling (28)
- Canoe (27)
- Cycling (26)
- Skating (24)
- Swimming (18)
- Ice hockey (14)
- Skiing (13)
- Football (11)
- Rowing (11)
- Biathlon (10)
- Bobsleigh (8)
- Judo (8)
- Volleyball (8)
- Boxing (7)
- Handball (7)
- Taekwondo (6)
- Fencing (4)
- Triathlon (4)
- Modern pentathlon (3)
- Shooting (3)
- Beach volleyball (2)
- Curling (2)
- Basketball (1)
- Sailing (1)
- Snowboard (1)
- Table tennis (1)
- Water polo (1)

Part 1 of the Report is available publicly on WADA's website: https://www.wada-ama.org/sites/default/files/resources/files/20160718_ip_report_newfinal.pdf

== December 2016 report (part 2) ==
On 9 December 2016, McLaren published the second part of his independent report. The investigation found that from 2011 to 2015, more than 1,000 Russian competitors in various sports (including summer, winter, and Paralympic sports) benefited from the cover-up. Emails indicate that they included five blind powerlifters, who may have been given drugs without their knowledge, and a fifteen-year-old.

Part 2 of the Report is available publicly on WADA's website: https://www.wada-ama.org/sites/default/files/resources/files/mclaren_report_part_ii_2.pdf

== Reaction ==
=== July 2016 report ===
- Russia was suspended from all international athletic competitions by the International Association of Athletics Federations, including the 2016 Summer Olympics. Russian weightlifters were banned from Rio Olympics for numerous anti-doping violations also.
- On 24 July, the IOC rejected WADA's recommendation to ban Russia from the Summer Olympics and announced that a decision would be made by each sport federation, with each positive decision having to be approved by a CAS arbitrator. WADA's president Craig Reedie said, "WADA is disappointed that the IOC did not heed WADA's Executive Committee recommendations that were based on the outcomes of the McLaren Investigation and would have ensured a straight-forward, strong and harmonized approach." On the IOC's decision to exclude Yuliya Stepanova, WADA director general Olivier Niggli stated that his agency was "very concerned by the message that this sends whistleblowers for the future."
- Originally Russia submitted a list of 389 athletes for the Rio Olympics competition. On 7 August 2016, the IOC cleared 278 athletes, while 111 were removed because of the scandal (including 67 athletes removed by IAAF before the IOC's decision).
- The IPC unanimously voted to ban Russian athletes from the 2016 Summer Paralympics in response to the discovery of a state-sponsored doping program.
- Although the IOC stated in July 2016 that it would ask sports federations to seek alternative hosts, Russia has retained hosting rights for some major international sports events, including the 2017 FIFA Confederations Cup, 2018 FIFA World Cup, and 2019 Winter Universiade. In September 2016, Russia was awarded hosting rights for the 2021 World Biathlon Championships because the IOC's recommendation did not apply to events that had already been awarded or planned bids from the country.

=== December 2016 report ===
- In December 2016, the International Biathlon Union (IBU) provisionally suspended two Russian biathletes Olga Vilukhina and Yana Romanova for doping violations during the 2014 Winter Olympics.
- In December 2016, the International Ski Federation (FIS) provisionally suspended six Russian cross-country skiers linked to doping violations during the 2014 Winter Olympics. The list includes Alexander Legkov, Maxim Vylegzhanin, Evgeniy Belov, Alexei Petukhov, Yevgeniya Shapovalova and Julia Ivanova.
- Some international winter sports events were reallocated from Russia, including the 2017 FIBT World Championships in Sochi, the 2017 Biathlon Junior World Championships in Ostrov, the 2016–17 Biathlon World Cup stage in Tyumen, the 2016–17 FIS Cross-Country World Cup final stage in Tyumen, the 2016–17 ISU Speed Skating World Cup stage in Chelyabinsk, and the 2021 World Biathlon Championships in Tyumen.

== See also ==
- Garcia Report
- Houston Astros sign stealing scandal
