= Jari Huttunen =

Finnish rally driver (born 1994)

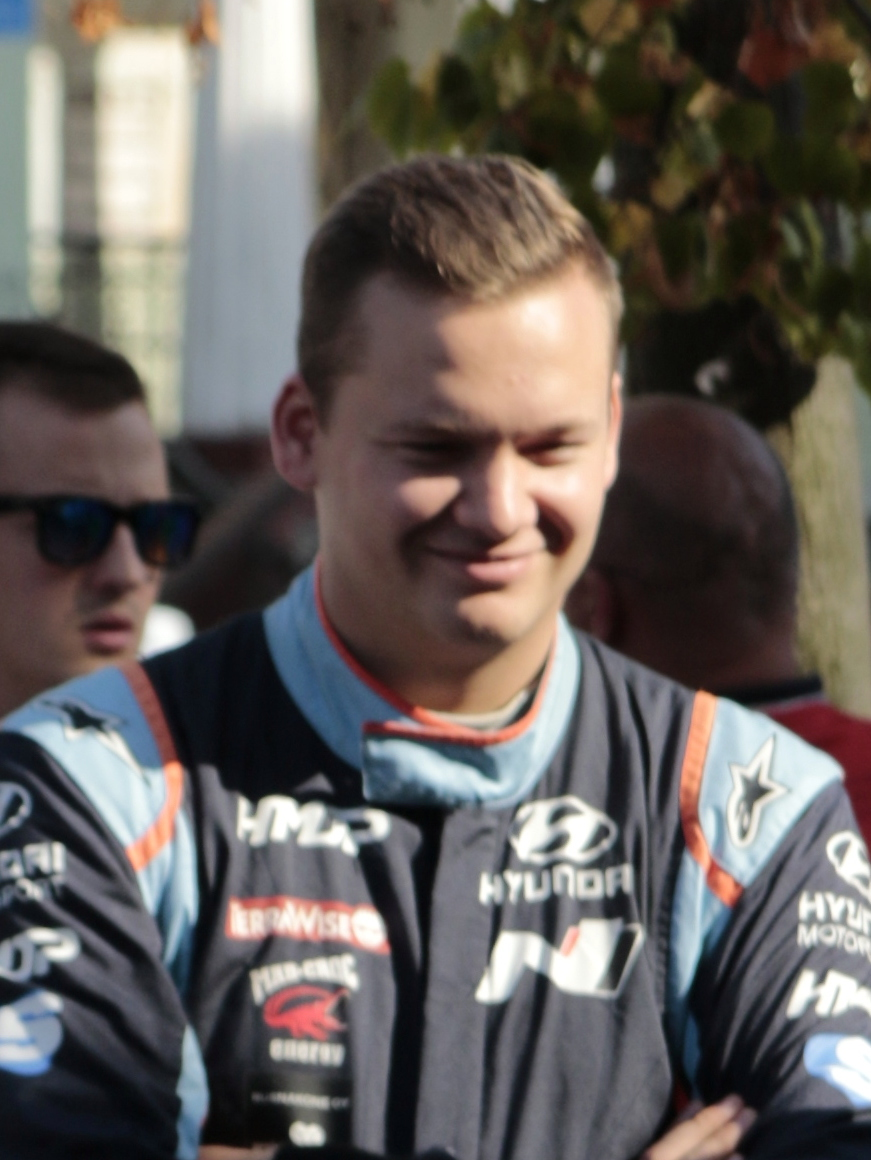
- Huttunen in 2018

Personal information
- Nationality: (Finland) Finnish
- Born: 28 February 1994 (age 32); Kiuruvesi, Finland

World Rally Championship record
- Years active: 2015, 2017–present
- Co-driver: Current (Finland) Mikko Lukka; Former (Finland) Antti Linnaketo
- Teams: Hyundai Motorsport, Printsport, M-Sport
- Rallies: 32
- Championships: 0
- Rally wins: 0
- Podiums: 0
- Stage wins: 1
- Total points: 24
- First rally: 2015 Rally Finland

Jari Huttunen (born 28 February 1994) is a Finnish rally driver from Kiuruvesi. He currently competes in the World Rally Championship-2, the premier support category of the World Rally Championship, for M-Sport Ford World Rally Team. He gained notoriety in the championship after winning his very first rally in the WRC-2 category, at the 2017 Rally Finland.

Huttunen is the 2020 World Rally Championship-3 champion. He also won the ADAC Opel Rallye Cup in 2016 and the Polish Rally Championship in 2020.

Huttunen is managed by two-time World Rally Champion Marcus Grönholm. His current co-driver is Mikko Lukka.

== Career ==
=== 2013–2014 ===
At the age of 19 in 2013, Huttunen decided to retire from go-kart competition and put a primary focus on rallying. He was hired by the AKK Driver Academy, and started in local rallying with a Suzuki Swift. After only achieving 57th place in one rally, Huttunen then switched it out for an Opel Kadett, and took a class win at the Oulujärvi Rally while placing fifth overall. In 2014, Huttunen continued to drive an Opel, but he switched the Kadett out for an Astra. At the Pohjola rally, he recorded fourth place overall, and another class win, which was a major improvement from his 57th place in the year before. Despite middling results, Huttunen obtained enough funding to make his debut in the Finnish Rally Championship. AKK Driver Academy supplied him with a Citroën C2 R2 car at the final two rallies of the 2014 championship. These rallies were his first in FIA-homologated machinery. In the last rally of the season, he scored a podium finish in the junior class.

=== 2015: Breakout years, hired by Printsport & WRC debut ===
The 2015 season would be Huttunen's breakout year into the junior categories of rallying in Finland. Still a member of the AKK Academy, Printsport hired Huttunen as a full-time driver in the 2015 Finnish championship in the R2 junior class, driving a Citroën C2 R2, like he did the previous season. Huttunen opened the 2015 season with a podium finish at the Arctic Lapland Rally, his first long-distance event. As the season went forward, Huttunen would go on to take two class wins and two more class podiums. Later on in the season, at Rally Finland, Huttunen would make his World Rally Championship début in the WRC-3 class. He was running in fourth until he crashed in the second leg which forced him to retire for the day. He finished the rally in an unremarkable eighth position. All this did not slow him down however, as by the end of the season he won the SM3 Class of the Finnish Rally Championship, his first regional championship win. With this, he was named "Rally Star of the Future" by the organizers of the Finnish Championship.

=== 2016: Move to the German Championship ===
After success in his home country, Huttunen entered in the Deutsche Rallye Meisterschaft (German Rally Championship) full-time in the Opel Rallye Cup class, in which all entrants enter a spec Opel Adam. It was in this championship where he really shined. Huttunen would end up winning all rallies in the championship except for one, and thus easily took the Opel Rallye Cup. Huttunen's domination of the German championship meant that he qualified for Opel's Junior Rally Team in the European Rally Championship the following season.

=== 2017: Opel & breakout onto the international scene ===
Huttunen began a full-time program in the European Rally Championship's ERC-3 junior category for Opel, and a few more regional rallies alongside. Huttunen had a team-mate to join him in the ERC-3 class, the British Chris Ingram. The season started strong for Huttunen, taking a victory in the Finnish and German championships each. In the ERC however, he found himself regularly outpaced by Ingram, and with half the year by, he only took second at the Canary Islands Rally. Then Huttunen returned to the World Rally Championship in its premier support category, the World Rally Championship-2, racing for Printsport at the Rally Finland. Racing a Škoda Fabia R5, this rally marked his second in four-wheel drive machinery, after a brief shakedown in a regional rally a few weeks earlier. Much to the surprise of many people, he won the WRC-2 class on his début in Finland, winning by 2 minutes and 17.8 seconds over Quentin Gilbert. It was only his second ever rally in the World Rally Championship itself. Huttunen ran the rest of his course with the Opel Junior Team, eventually finishing 3rd in the European Rally Championship-3 class. After the ERC season ended, Hyundai Motorsport ran Huttunen, along with many other hopeful drivers, on two test stages to choose a driver for their 2018 Hyundai R5 development program. Against stiff competition from the likes of Karl Kruuda, Gus Greensmith, Kalle Rovanperä and Pierre-Louis Loubet, Huttunen was chosen for the program. Huttunen's first rally with Hyundai was at Great Britain, at the end of the 2017 season. He failed to finish with mechanical issues after five stages.

=== 2018: Full season as a Hyundai junior ===
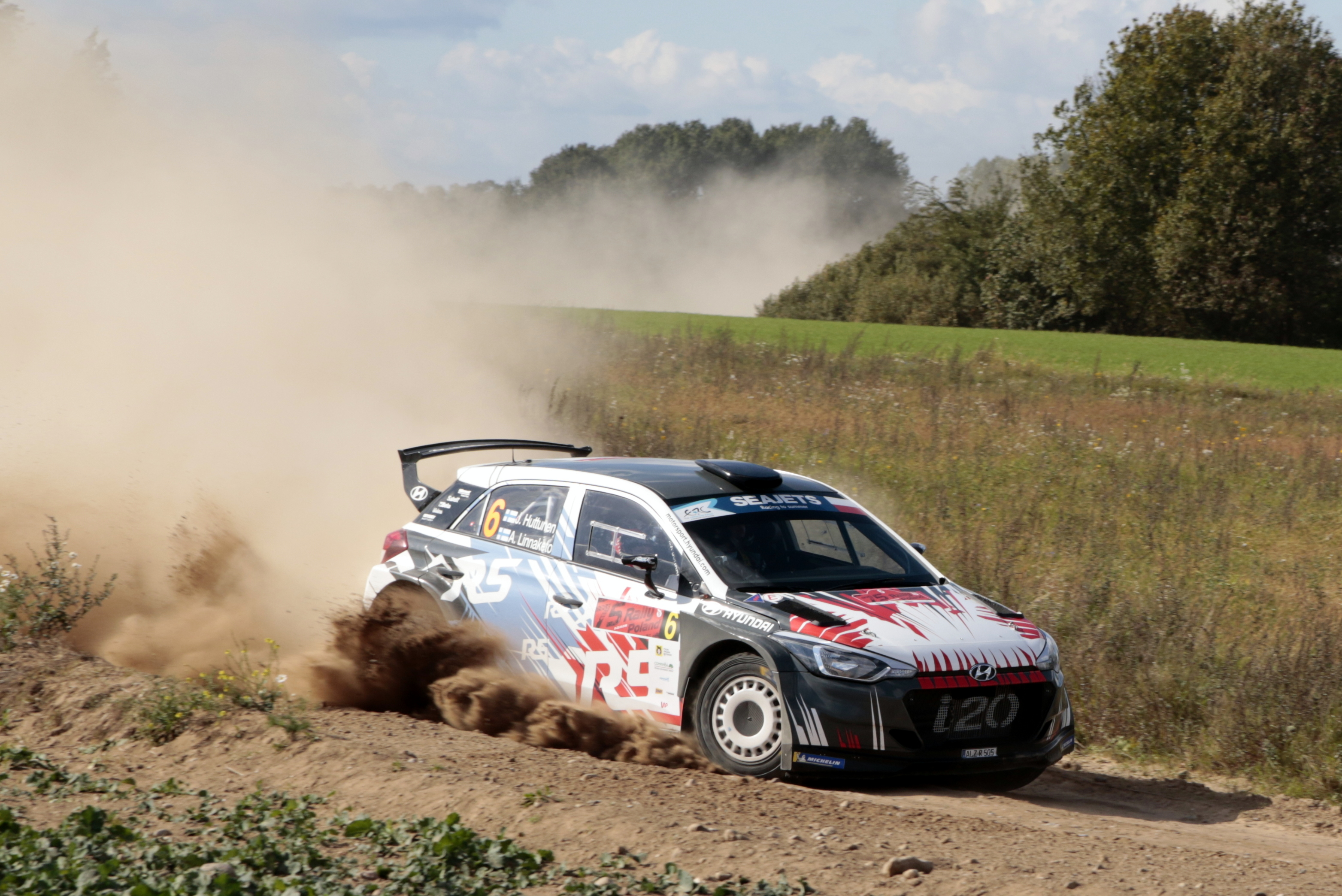
Jari Huttunen at the 2018 Rally Poland.

For the 2018 season, Huttunen took part in selected WRC-2 events for Hyundai Motorsport, which started with the Rally Sweden and Rally Mexico. Huttunen struggled in these rallies, failing to overcome the more competitive packages of Škoda Motorsport and Tommi Mäkinen Racing at Sweden, coming home sixth in the WRC-2 class. In Mexico, Huttunen was forced out of both legs 1 and 2 early due to mechanical failures, and finished 6th once again, this time over an hour behind class winner Pontus Tidemand. Despite these faults, Huttunen came back stronger later in the season. In his return to Rally Finland, he fought for WRC-2 class victory throughout most of the stages, and eventually finished a competitive second in the WRC-2 class, behind WRC-debutante Eerik Pietarinen. Huttunen also made a return to the European Rally Championship for Rally Poland, this time fighting for overall honours with a BRC Racing Team-entered Hyundai. Huttunen was in the running for victory the entire rally, his closest opponent being Nikolay Gryazin in Sports Racing Technologies. Despite a late charge in the final stages, a ten-second penalty meant he was forced to settle for second place once again. Huttunen capped off his development season with Hyundai at the Wales Rally GB, in which he finished fourth in the WRC-2 class, thus securing an eighth place finish in the World Rally Championship-2 standings.

=== 2019 ===
After a moderately successful season, Huttunen's role in the Hyundai junior development program was reduced, due to Hyundai putting greater focus on winning the World Rally Championship outright. In his initial start for the 2019 season, he returned to Škoda customer team Printsport for Rally Sweden on a one-rally deal. He performed very strongly and even won the SS8 outright over the main WRC field, an unprecedented feat in R5 rallying. Huttunen would win seven stages over the course of the event, but despite a late charge to catch the WRC-2 class leader Ole Christian Veiby, he would crash out with just two stages to go, running second. Huttunen would return to the Hyundai program with a third place finish at the Pirelli International Rally, a round of the British Rally Championship.

=== 2020: Winning in WRC-3 and Polish Rally Championship ===
2020 was a successful year for Huttunen. His co-driver was, once again, Mikko Lukka. The Finnish crew used a Hyundai i20 R5 in the championship.

Huttunen participated in four rounds of WRC-3. He won the Rally Sweden and Rally Italia Sardegna in WRC-3 class, he also finished second in Rally Estonia and third in ACI Rally Monza. All of his effort resulted in 83 points, five over Marco Bulacia Wilkinson and the championship. He was also able to score nine WRC points, which gave him the 14th place in the overall WRC classification.

Huttunen also participated in Polish Rally Championship, which due to COVID-19 consisted only three rounds. Huttunen won the 2020 MARMA Rajd Rzeszowski and the 2020 Rajd Śląska. He also finished second at 2020 championship finale, the 2020 Rajd Świdnicki KRAUSE. All of that gave him 93 points - enough to score the title ahead of Grzegorz Grzyb (85 points).

Huttunen also participated in the tests of the new Hyundai i20 Rally2.

== Career results ==
=== WRC results ===
| Year | Entrant | Car | 1 | 2 | 3 | 4 | 5 | 6 | 7 | 8 | 9 | 10 | 11 | 12 | 13 | 14 | Pos. | Points |
|---|---|---|---|---|---|---|---|---|---|---|---|---|---|---|---|---|---|---|
| 2015 | AKK Sports Team Finland | Citroën DS3 R3T Max | MON | SWE | MEX | ARG | POR | ITA | POL | FIN; 42 | GER | AUS | FRA | ESP | GBR | | NC | 0 |
| 2017 | Printsport | Škoda Fabia R5 | MON | SWE | MEX | FRA | ARG | POR | ITA | POL | FIN; 11 | | | | | | NC | 0 |
| 2017 | ADAC Opel Rallye Junior Team | Opel Adam R2 | | | | | | | | | | GER; 26 | ESP | | | | NC | 0 |
| 2017 | Sarrazin Motorsport | Hyundai i20 R5 | | | | | | | | | | | | GBR; Ret | AUS | | NC | 0 |
| 2018 | Hyundai Motorsport | Hyundai i20 R5 | MON | SWE; 18 | MEX; 18 | FRA | ARG | POR; 25 | ITA | FIN; 12 | GER; 27 | TUR | GBR; 12 | ESP; 23 | AUS | | NC | 0 |
| 2019 | Printsport | Škoda Fabia R5 | MON | SWE; Ret | MEX | FRA | ARG | CHL | | | | | | | | | NC | 0 |
| 2019 | Friulmotor Rally Team | Hyundai i20 R5 | | | | | | | POR; Ret | ITA | | | | | | | NC | 0 |
| 2019 | Hyundai Slovenija | Hyundai i20 R5 | | | | | | | | | FIN; 12 | GER | TUR | GBR | ESP | AUS; C | NC | 0 |
| 2020 | Jari Huttunen | Hyundai i20 R5 | MON | SWE; 10 | MEX | EST; 11 | TUR | ITA; 8 | MNZ; 8 | | | | | | | | 14th | 9 |
| 2021 | Hyundai Motorsport N | Hyundai i20 R5 | MON | ARC; Ret | CRO | POR | ITA; 5 | KEN | EST; Ret | | | | | | | | 16th | 10 |
| 2021 | Hyundai Motorsport N | Hyundai i20 N Rally2 | | | | | | | | BEL; 19 | GRE | FIN; 11 | ESP; Ret | | | | 16th | 10 |
| 2021 | M-Sport Ford WRT | Ford Fiesta Rally2 | | | | | | | | | | | | MNZ; 14 | | | 16th | 10 |
| 2022 | M-Sport Ford WRT | Ford Fiesta Rally2 | MON | SWE; 9 | CRO; 28 | POR | ITA; 10 | KEN | EST; 11 | | BEL; Ret | GRE | NZL | ESP; 15 | JPN | | 26th | 5 |
| 2022 | M-Sport Ford WRT | Ford Puma Rally1 | | | | | | | | FIN; 9 | | | | | | | 26th | 5 |

=== WRC-2 results ===
| Year | Entrant | Car | 1 | 2 | 3 | 4 | 5 | 6 | 7 | 8 | 9 | 10 | 11 | 12 | 13 | 14 | Pos. | Points |
|---|---|---|---|---|---|---|---|---|---|---|---|---|---|---|---|---|---|---|
| 2017 | Printsport | Škoda Fabia R5 | MON | SWE | MEX | FRA | ARG | POR | ITA | POL | FIN; 1 | GER | ESP | GBR | AUS | | 16th | 25 |
| 2018 | Hyundai Motorsport | Hyundai i20 R5 | MON | SWE; 6 | MEX; 6 | FRA | ARG | POR; 12 | ITA | FIN; 2 | GER; 12 | TUR | GBR; 4 | ESP; 11 | AUS | | 8th | 46 |
| 2019 | Printsport | Škoda Fabia R5 | MON | SWE; Ret | MEX | FRA | ARG | CHL | | | | | | | | | 24th | 18 |
| 2019 | Friulmotor Rally Team | Hyundai i20 R5 | | | | | | | POR; Ret | ITA | | | | | | | 24th | 18 |
| 2019 | Hyundai Slovenija | Hyundai i20 R5 | | | | | | | | | FIN; 2 | GER | TUR | GBR | ESP | AUS; C | 24th | 18 |
| 2021 | Hyundai Motorsport N | Hyundai i20 R5 | MON | ARC; Ret | CRO | POR | ITA; 1 | KEN | EST; Ret | | | | | | | | 3rd | 107 |
| 2021 | Hyundai Motorsport N | Hyundai i20 N Rally2 | | | | | | | | BEL; 1 | GRE | FIN; 3 | ESP; Ret | | | | 3rd | 107 |
| 2021 | M-Sport Ford WRT | Ford Fiesta Rally2 | | | | | | | | | | | | MNZ; 1 | | | 3rd | 107 |
| 2022 | M-Sport Ford WRT | Ford Fiesta Rally2 | MON | SWE; 3 | CRO; 18 | POR | ITA; 3 | KEN | EST; 4 | FIN | BEL; Ret | GRE | NZL | ESP; 5 | JPN | | 8th | 55 |

=== WRC-3 results ===
| Year | Entrant | Car | 1 | 2 | 3 | 4 | 5 | 6 | 7 | 8 | 9 | 10 | 11 | 12 | 13 | Pos. | Points |
|---|---|---|---|---|---|---|---|---|---|---|---|---|---|---|---|---|---|
| 2015 | AKK Sports Team Finland | Citroën DS3 R3T Max | MON | SWE | MEX | ARG | POR | ITA | POL | FIN; 8 | GER | AUS | FRA | ESP | GBR | 23rd | 4 |
| 2020 | Jari Huttunen | Hyundai i20 R5 | MON | SWE; 1 | MEX | EST; 2 | TUR | ITA; 1 | MNZ; 3 | | | | | | | 1st | 83 |

=== JWRC results ===
| Year | Entrant | Car | 1 | 2 | 3 | 4 | 5 | 6 | 7 | Pos. | Points |
|---|---|---|---|---|---|---|---|---|---|---|---|
| 2015 | AKK Sports Team Finland | Citroën DS3 R3T Max | MON | POR | POL | FIN; 7 | FRA | ESP | GBR | 17th | 6 |

=== Complete European Rally Championship-3 results ===
| Year | Entrant | Car | 1 | 2 | 3 | 4 | 5 | 6 | 7 | 8 | Pos. | Points |
|---|---|---|---|---|---|---|---|---|---|---|---|---|
| 2017 | Opel Rallye Junior Team | Opel Adam R2 | AZO; Ret | CAN; 2 | ACR | CYP | POL; 1 | ZLI; Ret | ROM; 2 | LIE; 4 | 3rd | 125 |
