= 2020 Rally Mexico =

17th edition of Rally Mexico

2020 Rally Mexico: 17. Rally Guanajuato Mexico
Round 3 of 7 in the 2020 World Rally Championship
← Previous event	Next event →
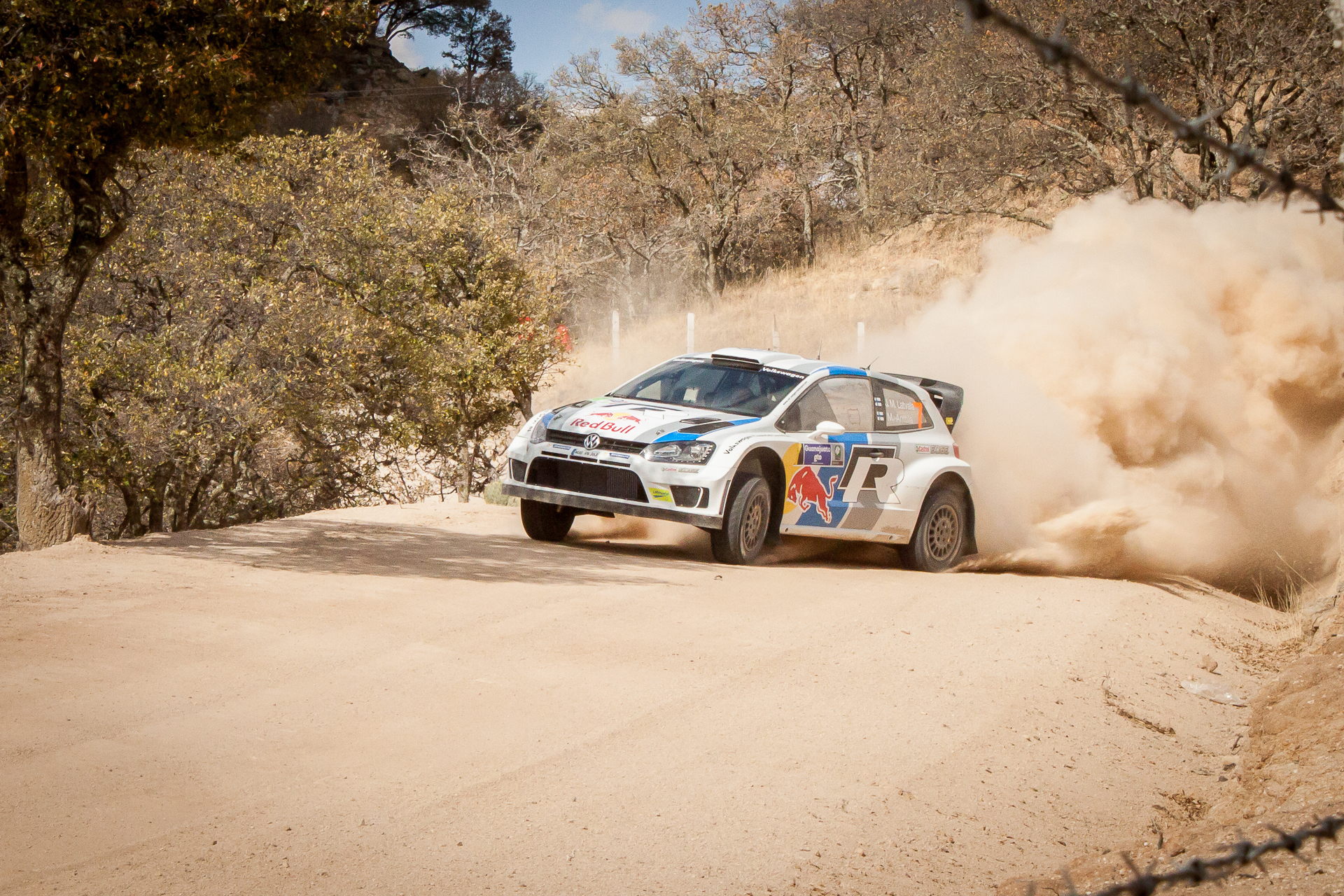
- Crews had to face the challenge of Mexico's high-altitude terrain.
- Host country: Mexico
- Rally base: León, Guanajuato
- Dates run: 12 – 15 March 2020
- Start location: Guanajuato City, Guanajuato
- Finish location: León, Guanajuato
- Stages: 24 (324.85 km; 201.85 miles)
- Stage surface: Gravel
- Transport distance: 634.40 km (394.20 miles)
- Overall distance: 959.25 km (596.05 miles)

Statistics
- Crews registered: 40
- Crews: 34 at start, 21 at finish
- Cancellation: Final leg cancelled due to travel restrictions to Europe.

Overall results
- Overall winner: (France) Sébastien Ogier (France) Julien Ingrassia (Japan) Toyota Gazoo Racing WRT; 2:47:47.6
- Power Stage winner: cancelled

Support category results
- WRC-2 winner: (Sweden) Pontus Tidemand (Sweden) Patrick Barth (Germany) Toksport WRT; 2:58:16.9
- WRC-3 winner: (Bolivia) Marco Bulacia Wilkinson (Italy) Giovanni Bernacchini; 3:01:25.1

The 2020 Rally Mexico (also known as the Rally Guanajuato Mexico 2020) was a motor racing event for rally cars that was held over four days between 12 and 15 March 2020. It marked the seventeenth running of Rally Mexico and was the third round of the 2020 World Rally Championship, World Rally Championship-2 and World Rally Championship-3. The 2020 event was based in the town of León in Guanajuato and consists of eleven special stages. The rally covered a total competitive distance of 324.85 km (201.85 mi).

Sébastien Ogier and Julien Ingrassia were the defending rally winners. Citroën World Rally Team, the team they drove for in 2019, were the reigning manufacturers' winners, but were not defending their title after parent company Citroën withdrew from the sport. Łukasz Pieniążek and Kamil Heller were the defending winners in the World Rally Championship-2 category, but they did not compete the rally. (Note: The championship was known as the World Rally Championship-2 Pro in 2019.) In the World Rally Championship-3 category, Local privateers Benito Guerra and Jaime Zapata were the reigning rally winners. (Note: The championship was known as the World Rally Championship-2 in 2019.)

Ogier and Ingrassia successfully defended their titles, clinching their sixth Mexico win. Their team, Toyota Gazoo Racing WRT, were the manufacturers' winners. Pontus Tidemand and Patrick Barth were the winners in the WRC-2 category. Marco Bulacia Wilkinson and Giovanni Bernacchini were the winners in the WRC-3 category, winning their first victory in the class.

== Background ==
=== Championship standings prior to the event ===
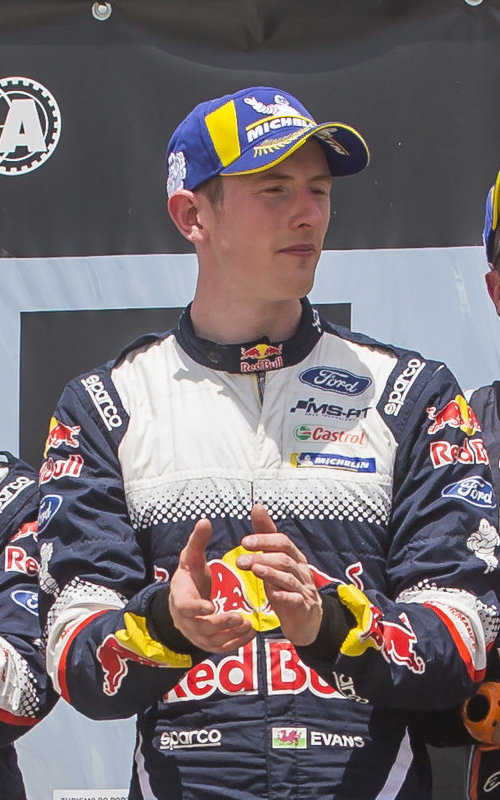
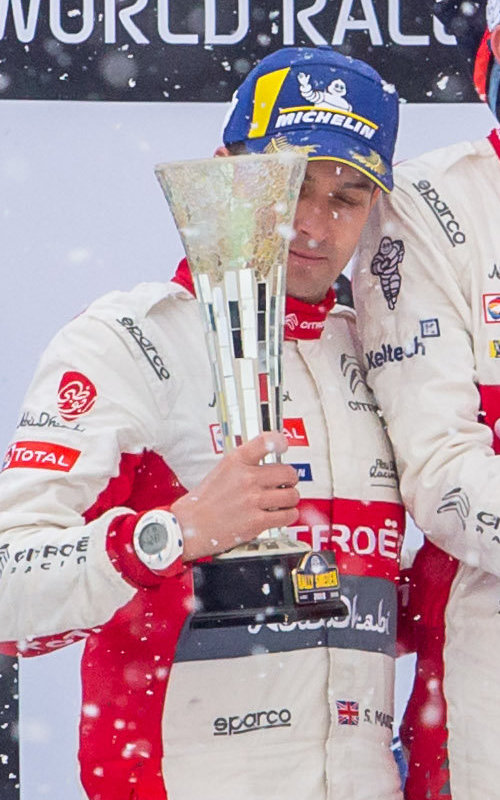
Elfyn Evans (left) and Scott Martin (right) lead both drivers' and co-drivers' championships for the first time in their careers.

Elfyn Evans and Scott Martin entered the round as championships leaders. Thierry Neuville and Nicolas Gilsoul were second, albeit they were level on points. Six-time world champions Sébastien Ogier and Julien Ingrassia were third, a slender five points behind. In the World Rally Championship for Manufacturers, Toyota Gazoo Racing WRT held a ten-point lead over defending manufacturers' champions Hyundai Shell Mobis WRT, following by M-Sport Ford WRT.

In the World Rally Championship-2 standings, Mads Østberg and Torstein Eriksen held a twenty-point lead ahead of Adrien Fourmaux and Renaud Jamoul in the drivers' and co-drivers' standings respectively, with Nikolay Gryazin and Yaroslav Fedorov in third. In the manufacturer' championship, M-Sport Ford WRT led PH-Sport by two points.

In the World Rally Championship-3 standings, the crew of Eric Camilli and François-Xavier Buresi, and Jari Huttunen and Mikko Lukka tied in the standings. They led drivers' and co-drivers' standings by seven points respectively, ahead of Nicolas Ciamin and Yannick Roche.

=== Entry list ===
The following crews entered into the rally. The event was open to crews competing in the World Rally Championship, its support categories, the World Rally Championship-2, World Rally Championship-3, and Junior World Rally Championship and privateer entries that were not registered to score points in any championship. Forty entries were received, with ten crews entered in World Rally Cars, three Group R5 cars entered in the World Rally Championship-2 and eleven in the World Rally Championship-3.

No.	Driver	Co-Driver	Entrant	Car	Tyre
World Rally Championship entries
3	(Finland) Teemu Suninen	(Finland) Jarmo Lehtinen	(United Kingdom) M-Sport Ford WRT	Ford Fiesta WRC	MI
4	(Finland) Esapekka Lappi	(Finland) Janne Ferm	(United Kingdom) M-Sport Ford WRT	Ford Fiesta WRC	MI
6	(Spain) Dani Sordo	(Spain) Carlos del Barrio	(South Korea) Hyundai Shell Mobis WRT	Hyundai i20 Coupe WRC	MI
8	(Estonia) Ott Tänak	(Estonia) Martin Järveoja	(South Korea) Hyundai Shell Mobis WRT	Hyundai i20 Coupe WRC	MI
11	(Belgium) Thierry Neuville	(Belgium) Nicolas Gilsoul	(South Korea) Hyundai Shell Mobis WRT	Hyundai i20 Coupe WRC	MI
17	(France) Sébastien Ogier	(France) Julien Ingrassia	(Japan) Toyota Gazoo Racing WRT	Toyota Yaris WRC	MI
33	(United Kingdom) Elfyn Evans	(United Kingdom) Scott Martin	(Japan) Toyota Gazoo Racing WRT	Toyota Yaris WRC	MI
34	(Lithuania) Deividas Jocius	(Lithuania) Mindaugas Varža	(United Kingdom) M-Sport Ford WRT	Ford Fiesta WRC	—N/a
44	(United Kingdom) Gus Greensmith	(United Kingdom) Elliott Edmondson	(United Kingdom) M-Sport Ford WRT	Ford Fiesta WRC	MI
69	(Finland) Kalle Rovanperä	(Finland) Jonne Halttunen	(Japan) Toyota Gazoo Racing WRT	Toyota Yaris WRC	MI
World Rally Championship-2 entries
20	(Russia) Nikolay Gryazin	(Russia) Yaroslav Fedorov	(South Korea) Hyundai Motorsport N (Note: Entry prepared by RedGrey Rally Team.)	Hyundai NG i20 R5	P
21	(Norway) Ole Christian Veiby	(Sweden) Jonas Andersson	(South Korea) Hyundai Motorsport N	Hyundai NG i20 R5	P
22	(Sweden) Pontus Tidemand	(Sweden) Patrick Barth	(Germany) Toksport WRT	Škoda Fabia R5 Evo	P
World Rally Championship-3 entries
23	(Sweden) Oliver Solberg	(Republic of Ireland) Aaron Johnston	(Sweden) Oliver Solberg (Note: Entry operated by Solberg World Rally.)	Volkswagen Polo GTI R5	P
24	(Brazil) Paulo Nobre	(Brazil) Gabriel Morales	(Brazil) Paulo Nobre (Note: Entry operated by Palmeirinha Rally.)	Škoda Fabia R5	—N/a
25	(Poland) Kajetan Kajetanowicz	(Poland) Maciej Szczepaniak	(Poland) Kajetan Kajetanowicz (Note: Entry operated by Lotos Dynamic World Rally Team.)	Škoda Fabia R5	P
26	(Mexico) Benito Guerra	(Spain) Daniel Cué	(Mexico) Benito Guerra	Škoda Fabia R5	MI
27	(Bolivia) Marco Bulacia Wilkinson	(Italy) Giovanni Bernacchini	(Bolivia) Marco Bulacia Wilkinson (Note: Entry operated by VIALCO Racing.)	Citroën C3 R5	P
28	(Chile) Alberto Heller	(Argentina) José Díaz	(Chile) Alberto Heller	Ford Fiesta R5 Mk. II	MI
29	(Mexico) Ricardo Triviño	(Spain) Marc Martí	(Mexico) Ricardo Triviño	Škoda Fabia R5	P
30	(Italy) Gianluca Linari	(Italy) Nicola Arena	(Italy) Gianluca Linari	Ford Fiesta R5	P
31	(Russia) Radik Shaymiev	(Russia) Maxim Tsvetkov	(Russia) Radik Shaymiev	Ford Fiesta R5	—N/a
32	(Chile) Emilio Fernández	(Argentina) Ruben Garcia	(Germany) Toksport WRT	Škoda Fabia R5	MI
34	(Republic of Ireland) Barry McKenna	(Republic of Ireland) James Fulton	(Republic of Ireland) Barry McKenna	Škoda Fabia R5	MI
Other major entries
43	(United States) Ken Block	(Italy) Alex Gelsomino	(United States) Ken Block (Note: Entry operated by Hoonigan Racing Division.)	Ford Escort RS Cosworth	T

=== Route ===
All the stages are located in the state of Guanajuato. The final day of the rally was cancelled in response to increased travel restrictions stemming from the COVID-19 pandemic. As such, the rally concluded following stage 21, with full points awarded at the end of Saturday.

==== Itinerary ====
All dates and times are CST (UTC-6).

Date	Time	No.	Stage name	Distance
12 March	10:01	—	Llano Grande [Shakedown]	5.51 km
Leg 1 — 135.10 km
12 March	20:08	SS1	Monster Energy Street Stage GTO 1	1.12 km
12 March	20:31	SS2	Monster Energy Street Stage GTO 2	1.12 km
13 March	09:08	SS3	El Chocolate 1	31.45 km
13 March	10:16	SS4	Ortega 1	17.24 km
13 March	11:14	SS5	Las Minas 1	13.69 km
13 March	12:12	SS6	Parque Bicentenario	2.71 km
13 March	15:35	SS7	El Chocolate 2	31.45 km
13 March	16:43	SS8	Ortega 2	17.24 km
13 March	17:41	SS9	Las Minas 2	13.69 km
13 March	19:21	SS10	SSS Autodromo Shell V-Power 1	2.33 km
13 March	19:26	SS11	SSS Autodromo Shell V-Power 2	2.33 km
13 March	19:26	SS12	Street Stage León	0.73 km
Leg 2 — 133.74 km
14 March	08:58	SS13	Guanajuatito 1	24.96 km
14 March	10:01	SS14	Alfaro 1	16.99 km
14 March	11:08	SS15	Derramadero 1	21.78 km
14 March	14:56	SS16	Guanajuatito 2	24.96 km
14 March	15:59	SS17	Alfaro 2	16.99 km
14 March	17:08	SS18	Derramadero 2	21.78 km
14 March	18:38	SS19	SSS Autodromo Shell V-Power 3	2.33 km
14 March	18:43	SS20	SSS Autodromo Shell V-Power 4	2.33 km
14 March	19:26	SS21	Rock & Rally León	1.62 km
Leg 3 — 56.01 km
15 March	08:38	SS22	Otates	33.61 km
15 March	09:56	SS23	San Diego	12.76 km
15 March	11:18	SS24	El Brinco [Power Stage]	9.64 km

=== Impact of the coronavirus pandemic ===
The rally was run during the COVID-19 coronavirus pandemic, and came at a time when a series of motorsport events—including Rally Argentina, rounds of the 2020 Formula One World Championship, 2019-20 World Endurance Championship, 2020 World Rallycross Championship and 2020 World Touring Car Cup—were either postponed or cancelled. Organisers of the rally decided to shorten the itinerary by cancelling the final leg of the event. This was done to allow teams time to pack up their equipment and return to their headquarters before a series of travel bans were imposed by European countries trying to manage the virus.

== Report ==
=== World Rally Cars ===
It was a nightmare Friday for the Hyundai squad. An early radiator pipe issue Dani Sordo and Carlos del Barrio cost them over five minutes, and a late terminal engine issue sent the Spanish crew out of the rally; Ott Tänak and Martin Järveoja dropped over forty seconds when they picked up damage to the rear-right corner after leading the rally shortly; Thierry Neuville and Nicolas Gilsoul was running third overall, but they had to retire from the day with electrical gremlins. One more major retirement came from Esapekka Lappi and Janne Ferm when their Fiesta caught fire. Six-time world champions Sébastien Ogier and Julien Ingrassia managed to stay out of dramas, and won his first rally of the season after the rally ended prematurely.

==== Classification ====
Position		No.	Driver	Co-driver	Entrant	Car	Time	Difference	Points	
Event	Class	No.	Driver	Co-driver	Entrant	Car	Time	Difference	Event	Stage (Note: Due to the cancellation of the Sunday stages, no Power Stage was held, meaning no bonus points were awarded.)
1	1	17	Sébastien Ogier	Julien Ingrassia	Toyota Gazoo Racing WRT	Toyota Yaris WRC	2:47:47.6	0.0	25	—N/a
2	2	8	Ott Tänak	Martin Järveoja	Hyundai Shell Mobis WRT	Hyundai i20 Coupe WRC	2:48:15.4	+27.8	18	—N/a
3	3	3	Teemu Suninen	Jarmo Lehtinen	M-Sport Ford WRT	Ford Fiesta WRC	2:48:25.5	+37.9	15	—N/a
4	4	33	Elfyn Evans	Scott Martin	Toyota Gazoo Racing WRT	Toyota Yaris WRC	2:49:01.0	+1:13.4	12	—N/a
5	5	69	Kalle Rovanperä	Jonne Halttunen	Toyota Gazoo Racing WRT	Toyota Yaris WRC	2:50:08.1	+2:20.5	10	—N/a
9	6	44	Gus Greensmith	Elliott Edmondson	M-Sport Ford WRT	Ford Fiesta WRC	3:01:44.1	+13:56.5	2	—N/a
16	7	11	Thierry Neuville	Nicolas Gilsoul	Hyundai Shell Mobis WRT	Hyundai i20 Coupe WRC	3:30:25.7	+42:38.1	0	—N/a
Retired SS8		4	Esapekka Lappi	Janne Ferm	M-Sport Ford WRT	Ford Fiesta WRC	Fire		0	—N/a
Retired SS7		6	Dani Sordo	Carlos del Barrio	Hyundai Shell Mobis WRT	Hyundai i20 Coupe WRC	Engine		0	—N/a
Did not start		34	Deividas Jocius	Mindaugas Varža	M-Sport Ford WRT	Ford Fiesta WRC	Withdrawn		0	—N/a

==== Special stages ====
Date	No.	Stage name	Distance	Winners	Car	Time	Class leaders
12 March	—	Llano Grande [Shakedown]	5.51 km	Evans / Martin	Toyota Yaris WRC	3:41.8	—N/a
12 March	SS1	Monster Energy Street Stage GTO 1	1.12 km	Neuville / Gilsoul	Hyundai i20 Coupe WRC	59.1	Neuville / Gilsoul
12 March	SS2	Monster Energy Street Stage GTO 2	1.12 km	Neuville / Gilsoul	Hyundai i20 Coupe WRC	57.5	Neuville / Gilsoul
13 March	SS3	El Chocolate 1	31.45 km	Tänak / Järveoja	Hyundai i20 Coupe WRC	23:34.6	Tänak / Järveoja
13 March	SS4	Ortega 1	17.24 km	Ogier / Ingrassia	Toyota Yaris WRC	9:29.1	Ogier / Ingrassia
13 March	SS5	Las Minas 1	13.69 km	Sordo / del Barrio	Hyundai i20 Coupe WRC	9:01.2	Ogier / Ingrassia
13 March	SS6	Parque Bicentenario	2.71 km	Neuville / Gilsoul	Hyundai i20 Coupe WRC	2:30.3	Ogier / Ingrassia
13 March	SS7	El Chocolate 2	31.45 km	Tänak / Järveoja	Hyundai i20 Coupe WRC	23:16.2	Ogier / Ingrassia
13 March	SS8	Ortega 2	17.24 km	Stage cancelled			
13 March	SS9	Las Minas 2	13.69 km	Tänak / Järveoja	Hyundai i20 Coupe WRC	8:53.5	Ogier / Ingrassia
13 March	SS10	SSS Autodromo Shell V-Power 1	2.33 km	Ogier / Ingrassia	Toyota Yaris WRC	1:39.0	Ogier / Ingrassia
13 March	SS11	SSS Autodromo Shell V-Power 2	2.33 km	Ogier / Ingrassia	Toyota Yaris WRC	1:37.4	Ogier / Ingrassia
13 March	SS12	Street Stage León	0.73 km	Rovanperä / Halttunen	Toyota Yaris WRC	45.7	Ogier / Ingrassia
14 March	SS13	Guanajuatito 1	24.96 km	Ogier / Ingrassia	Toyota Yaris WRC	16:44.8	Ogier / Ingrassia
14 March	SS14	Alfaro 1	16.99 km	Neuville / Gilsoul	Hyundai i20 Coupe WRC	10:39.5	Ogier / Ingrassia
14 March	SS15	Derramadero 1	21.78 km	Tänak / Järveoja	Hyundai i20 Coupe WRC	12:25.7	Ogier / Ingrassia
14 March	SS16	Guanajuatito 2	24.96 km	Neuville / Gilsoul	Hyundai i20 Coupe WRC	16:36.0	Ogier / Ingrassia
14 March	SS17	Alfaro 2	16.99 km	Tänak / Järveoja	Hyundai i20 Coupe WRC	10:37.1	Ogier / Ingrassia
14 March	SS18	Derramadero 2	21.78 km	Tänak / Järveoja	Hyundai i20 Coupe WRC	12:19.0	Ogier / Ingrassia
14 March	SS19	SSS Autodromo Shell V-Power 3	2.33 km	Neuville / Gilsoul	Hyundai i20 Coupe WRC	1:38.4	Ogier / Ingrassia
14 March	SS20	SSS Autodromo Shell V-Power 4	2.33 km	Neuville / Gilsoul	Hyundai i20 Coupe WRC	1:37.1	Ogier / Ingrassia
14 March	SS21	Rock & Rally León	1.62 km	Neuville / Gilsoul	Hyundai i20 Coupe WRC	1:38.6	Ogier / Ingrassia
15 March	SS22	Otates	33.61 km	Leg cancelled			
15 March	SS23	San Diego	12.76 km	Leg cancelled			
15 March	SS24	El Brinco [Power Stage]	9.64 km	Leg cancelled			

==== Championship standings ====
Pos.	Drivers' championships			Co-drivers' championships			Manufacturers' championships		
Pos.	Move	Driver	Points	Move	Co-driver	Points	Move	Manufacturer	Points
1	2	Sébastien Ogier	62	2	Julien Ingrassia	62		Toyota Gazoo Racing WRT	110
2	1	Elfyn Evans	54	1	Scott Martin	54		Hyundai Shell Mobis WRT	89
3	1	Thierry Neuville	42	1	Nicolas Gilsoul	42		M-Sport Ford WRT	65
4		Kalle Rovanperä	40		Jonne Halttunen	40			
5	1	Ott Tänak	38	1	Martin Järveoja	38			

=== World Rally Championship-2 ===
Pontus Tidemand and Patrick Barth dominated the rally, winning their first rally in the season.

==== Classification ====
Position		No.	Driver	Co-driver	Entrant	Car	Time	Difference	Points	
Event	Class	No.	Driver	Co-driver	Entrant	Car	Time	Difference	Class	Event
6	1	22	Pontus Tidemand	Patrick Barth	Toksport WRT	Škoda Fabia R5 Evo	2:58:16.9	0.0	25	8
7	2	20	Nikolay Gryazin	Yaroslav Fedorov	Hyundai Motorsport N	Hyundai i20 R5	3:00:14.6	+1:57.7	18	6
10	3	21	Ole Christian Veiby	Jonas Andersson	Hyundai Motorsport N	Hyundai i20 R5	3:03:19.8	+5:02.9	15	1

==== Special stages ====
Date	No.	Stage name	Distance	Winners	Car	Time	Class leaders
12 March	—	Llano Grande [Shakedown]	5.51 km	Tidemand / Barth	Škoda Fabia R5 Evo	3:55.8	—N/a
12 March	SS1	Monster Energy Street Stage GTO 1	1.12 km	Tidemand / Barth	Škoda Fabia R5 Evo	1:02.5	Tidemand / Barth
12 March	SS2	Monster Energy Street Stage GTO 2	1.12 km	Tidemand / Barth	Škoda Fabia R5 Evo	1:01.3	Tidemand / Barth
13 March	SS3	El Chocolate 1	31.45 km	Tidemand / Barth	Škoda Fabia R5 Evo	25:07.2	Tidemand / Barth
13 March	SS4	Ortega 1	17.24 km	Tidemand / Barth	Škoda Fabia R5 Evo	10:08.6	Tidemand / Barth
13 March	SS5	Las Minas 1	13.69 km	Tidemand / Barth	Škoda Fabia R5 Evo	9:31.0	Tidemand / Barth
13 March	SS6	Parque Bicentenario	2.71 km	Tidemand / Barth	Škoda Fabia R5 Evo	2:39.5	Tidemand / Barth
13 March	SS7	El Chocolate 2	31.45 km	Tidemand / Barth	Škoda Fabia R5 Evo	24:15.7	Tidemand / Barth
13 March	SS8	Ortega 2	17.24 km	Stage cancelled			
13 March	SS9	Las Minas 2	13.69 km	Tidemand / Barth	Škoda Fabia R5 Evo	9:26.1	Tidemand / Barth
13 March	SS10	SSS Autodromo Shell V-Power 1	2.33 km	Tidemand / Barth	Škoda Fabia R5 Evo	1:43.4	Tidemand / Barth
13 March	SS11	SSS Autodromo Shell V-Power 2	2.33 km	Tidemand / Barth	Škoda Fabia R5 Evo	1:42.0	Tidemand / Barth
13 March	SS12	Street Stage León	0.73 km	Tidemand / Barth	Škoda Fabia R5 Evo	48.6	Tidemand / Barth
14 March	SS13	Guanajuatito 1	24.96 km	Veiby / Andersson	Hyundai i20 R5	17:46.1	Tidemand / Barth
14 March	SS14	Alfaro 1	16.99 km	Veiby / Andersson	Hyundai i20 R5	11:19.2	Tidemand / Barth
14 March	SS15	Derramadero 1	21.78 km	Veiby / Andersson	Hyundai i20 R5	13:20.5	Tidemand / Barth
14 March	SS16	Guanajuatito 2	24.96 km	Tidemand / Barth	Škoda Fabia R5 Evo	17:49.5	Tidemand / Barth
14 March	SS17	Alfaro 2	16.99 km	Veiby / Andersson	Hyundai i20 R5	11:23.8	Tidemand / Barth
14 March	SS18	Derramadero 2	21.78 km	Tidemand / Barth	Škoda Fabia R5 Evo	13:13.2	Tidemand / Barth
14 March	SS19	SSS Autodromo Shell V-Power 3	2.33 km	Tidemand / Barth	Škoda Fabia R5 Evo	1:43.2	Tidemand / Barth
14 March	SS20	SSS Autodromo Shell V-Power 4	2.33 km	Tidemand / Barth	Škoda Fabia R5 Evo	1:41.5	Tidemand / Barth
14 March	SS21	Rock & Rally León	1.62 km	Tidemand / Barth	Škoda Fabia R5 Evo	1:41.4	Tidemand / Barth
15 March	SS22	Otates	33.61 km	Leg cancelled			
15 March	SS23	San Diego	12.76 km	Leg cancelled			
15 March	SS24	El Brinco	9.64 km	Leg cancelled			

==== Championship standings ====
Pos.	Drivers' championships			Co-drivers' championships			Manufacturers' championships		
Pos.	Move	Driver	Points	Move	Co-driver	Points	Move	Manufacturer	Points
1		Mads Østberg	50		Torstein Eriksen	50	2	Hyundai Motorsport N	74
2	1	Nikolay Gryazin	41	1	Yaroslav Fedorov	41	1	M-Sport Ford WRT	52
3	3	Pontus Tidemand	40	3	Patrick Barth	40	1	PH-Sport	50
4	1	Ole Christian Veiby	33	1	Jonas Andersson	33		Toksport WRT	40
5	3	Adrien Fourmaux	30	3	Renaud Jamoul	30			

=== World Rally Championship-3 ===
Marco Bulacia Wilkinson and Giovanni Bernacchini led the category, and eventually won their maiden victory in the class. Early leaders Oliver Solberg and Aaron Johnston retired from the rally when they hit a rock and smashed his Polo's sump.

==== Classification ====
Position		No.	Driver	Co-driver	Entrant	Car	Time	Difference	Points	
Event	Class	No.	Driver	Co-driver	Entrant	Car	Time	Difference	Class	Event
8	1	27	Marco Bulacia Wilkinson	Giovanni Bernacchini	Marco Bulacia Wilkinson	Citroën C3 R5	3:01:25.1	0.0	25	4
11	2	32	Emilio Fernández	Ruben Garcia	Toksport WRT	Škoda Fabia R5	3:05:36.2	+4:11.1	18	0
12	3	29	Ricardo Triviño	Marc Martí	Ricardo Triviño	Škoda Fabia R5	3:08:48.0	+7:22.9	15	0
14	4	25	Kajetan Kajetanowicz	Maciej Szczepaniak	Kajetan Kajetanowicz	Škoda Fabia R5	3:14:58.4	+13:33.3	12	0
20	5	26	Benito Guerra	Daniel Cué	Benito Guerra	Škoda Fabia R5	4:21:28.0	+1:20:02.9	10	0
Retired SS17		30	Gianluca Linari	Nicola Arena	Gianluca Linari	Ford Fiesta R5	Mechanical		0	0
Retired SS17		34	Barry McKenna	James Fulton	Barry McKenna	Škoda Fabia R5	Mechanical		0	0
Retired SS5		28	Alberto Heller	José Díaz	Alberto Heller	Ford Fiesta R5 Mk. II	Mechanical		0	0
Retired SS4		26	Oliver Solberg	Aaron Johnston	Oliver Solberg	Volkswagen Polo GTI R5	Oil sump		0	0
Did not start		24	Paulo Nobre	Gabriel Morales	Paulo Nobre	Škoda Fabia R5	Withdrawn		0	0
Did not start		31	Radik Shaymiev	Mindaugas Varža	Maxim Tsvetkov	Ford Fiesta R5	Withdrawn		0	0

==== Special stages ====
Date	No.	Stage name	Distance	Winners	Car	Time	Class leaders
12 March	—	Llano Grande [Shakedown]	5.51 km	Solberg / Johnston	Volkswagen Polo GTI R5	3:55.5	—N/a
12 March	SS1	Monster Energy Street Stage GTO 1	1.12 km	Solberg / Johnston	Volkswagen Polo GTI R5	1:02.3	Solberg / Johnston
12 March	SS2	Monster Energy Street Stage GTO 2	1.12 km	Solberg / Johnston	Volkswagen Polo GTI R5	1:00.7	Solberg / Johnston
13 March	SS3	El Chocolate 1	31.45 km	Heller / Díaz	Ford Fiesta R5 Mk. II	24:56.5	Heller / Díaz
13 March	SS4	Ortega 1	17.24 km	Bulacia Wilkinson / Bernacchini	Citroën C3 R5	10:17.8	Bulacia Wilkinson / Bernacchini
13 March	SS5	Las Minas 1	13.69 km	Bulacia Wilkinson / Bernacchini	Citroën C3 R5	9:55.9	Bulacia Wilkinson / Bernacchini
13 March	SS6	Parque Bicentenario	2.71 km	Kajetanowicz / Szczepaniak	Škoda Fabia R5	2:44.2	Bulacia Wilkinson / Bernacchini
13 March	SS7	El Chocolate 2	31.45 km	Bulacia Wilkinson / Bernacchini	Citroën C3 R5	24:49.8	Bulacia Wilkinson / Bernacchini
13 March	SS8	Ortega 2	17.24 km	Stage cancelled			
13 March	SS9	Las Minas 2	13.69 km	Kajetanowicz / Szczepaniak	Škoda Fabia R5	9:54.1	Bulacia Wilkinson / Bernacchini
13 March	SS10	SSS Autodromo Shell V-Power 1	2.33 km	Bulacia Wilkinson / Bernacchini	Citroën C3 R5	1:45.0	Bulacia Wilkinson / Bernacchini
13 March	SS11	SSS Autodromo Shell V-Power 2	2.33 km	Bulacia Wilkinson / Bernacchini	Citroën C3 R5	1:43.6	Bulacia Wilkinson / Bernacchini
13 March	SS12	Street Stage León	0.73 km	Bulacia Wilkinson / Bernacchini	Citroën C3 R5	49.2	Bulacia Wilkinson / Bernacchini
14 March	SS13	Guanajuatito 1	24.96 km	Guerra / Cué	Škoda Fabia R5	18:09.3	Bulacia Wilkinson / Bernacchini
14 March	SS14	Alfaro 1	16.99 km	Guerra / Cué	Škoda Fabia R5	11:30.5	Bulacia Wilkinson / Bernacchini
14 March	SS15	Derramadero 1	21.78 km	Bulacia Wilkinson / Bernacchini	Citroën C3 R5	13:46.3	Bulacia Wilkinson / Bernacchini
14 March	SS16	Guanajuatito 2	24.96 km	Bulacia Wilkinson / Bernacchini	Citroën C3 R5	18:07.2	Bulacia Wilkinson / Bernacchini
14 March	SS17	Alfaro 2	16.99 km	Bulacia Wilkinson / Bernacchini	Citroën C3 R5	11:31.8	Bulacia Wilkinson / Bernacchini
14 March	SS18	Derramadero 2	21.78 km	Bulacia Wilkinson / Bernacchini	Citroën C3 R5	13:27.9	Bulacia Wilkinson / Bernacchini
14 March	SS19	SSS Autodromo Shell V-Power 3	2.33 km	Fernández / Garcia	Škoda Fabia R5	1:44.7	Bulacia Wilkinson / Bernacchini
14 March	SS20	SSS Autodromo Shell V-Power 4	2.33 km	Fernández / Garcia	Škoda Fabia R5	1:43.3	Bulacia Wilkinson / Bernacchini
14 March	SS21	Rock & Rally León	1.62 km	Fernández / Garcia	Škoda Fabia R5	1:44.2	Bulacia Wilkinson / Bernacchini
15 March	SS22	Otates	33.61 km	Leg cancelled			
15 March	SS23	San Diego	12.76 km	Leg cancelled			
15 March	SS24	El Brinco	9.64 km	Leg cancelled			

==== Championship standings ====
Pos.	Drivers' championships			Co-drivers' championships		
Pos.	Move	Driver	Points	Move	Co-driver	Points
1		Eric Camilli	25		François-Xavier Buresi	25
2		Jari Huttunen	25		Mikko Lukka	25
3		Marco Bulacia Wilkinson	25		Giovanni Bernacchini	25
4	1	Nicolas Ciamin	18	1	Yannick Roche	18
5	1	Emil Lindholm	18	1	Mikael Korhonen	18

== Notes ==
Previous rally: 2020 Rally Sweden	2020 FIA World Rally Championship	Next rally: 2020 Rally Estonia; Several rallies called off
Previous rally: 2019 Rally Mexico	2020 Rally Mexico	Next rally: 2023 Rally Mexico
