= 2018 Rally de Portugal =

Motor racing event in Portugal

2018 Rally de Portugal 52°Vodafone Rally de Portugal
Round 6 of 13 in the 2018 World Rally Championship
← Previous event	Next event →
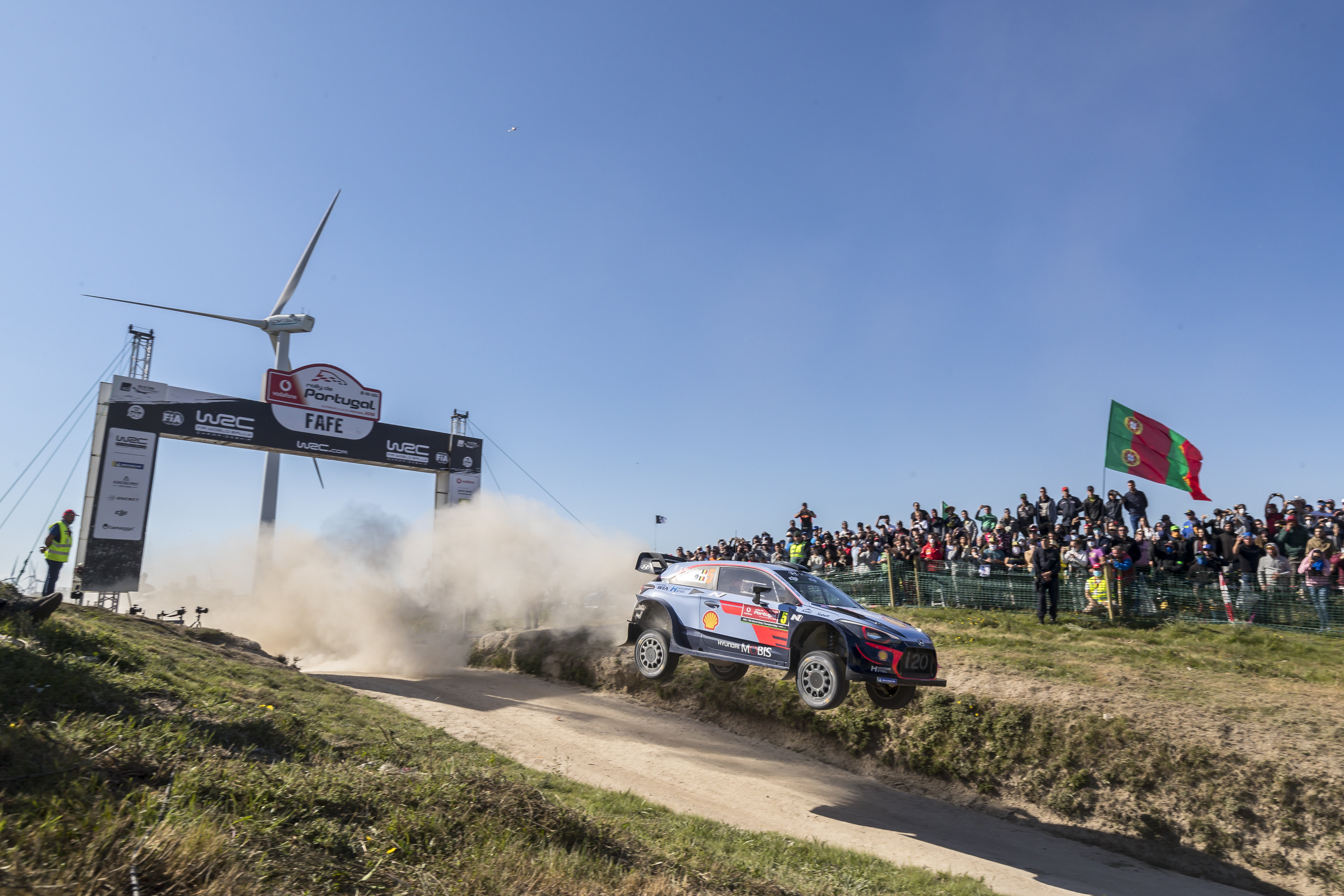
- Rally winning crew Thierry Neuville and Nicolas Gilsoul at the iconic Fafe Stage.
- Host country: Portugal
- Rally base: Matosinhos, Porto
- Dates run: 17 – 20 May 2018
- Start location: Guimarães Castle, Braga
- Finish location: Fafe, Braga
- Stages: 20 (358.19 km; 222.57 miles)
- Stage surface: Gravel
- Transport distance: 1,225.33 km (761.38 miles)
- Overall distance: 1,583.08 km (983.68 miles)

Statistics
- Crews registered: 85
- Crews: 85 at start, 45 at finish

Overall results
- Overall winner: (Belgium) Thierry Neuville (Belgium) Nicolas Gilsoul (South Korea) Hyundai Shell Mobis WRT; 3:49:46.6
- Power Stage winner: (Finland) Esapekka Lappi (Finland) Janne Ferm (Japan) Toyota Gazoo Racing WRT

Support category results
- WRC-2 winner: (Sweden) Pontus Tidemand (Sweden) Jonas Andersson (Czech Republic) Škoda Motorsport; 4:03:57.4
- WRC-3 winner: (Sweden) Denis Rådström (Sweden) Johan Johansson (Sweden) Denis Rådström; 4:26:51.2

The 2018 Rally de Portugal (formally known as the Vodafone Rally de Portugal 2018) was a motor racing event for rally cars that was held over four days between 17 and 20 May 2018. It marked the fifty-second running of Rally de Portugal, and was the sixth round of the 2018 FIA World Rally Championship and its support categories, the WRC-2 and WRC-3 championships, and the third round of the Junior WRC championship. The event was based in Matosinhos in Porto and consisted of twenty special stages totalling 358.19 km (222.57 mi) competitive kilometres. The event was also part of the Portuguese national championship (first 9 stages) and Peugeot Rally Cup Ibérica (first 12 stages); their participants did not feature in the overall placings.

Sébastien Ogier and Julien Ingrassia were the defending rally winners. Thierry Neuville and Nicolas Gilsoul were the rally winners. Their team, Hyundai Shell Mobis WRT, were the manufacturers' winners. The Škoda Motorsport crew of Pontus Tidemand and Jonas Andersson won the World Rally Championship-2 category in a Škoda Fabia R5, while Swedish crew Denis Rådström and Johan Johansson won the World Rally Championship-3 and Junior World Rally Championship.

== Background ==
=== Championship standings prior to the event ===
Sébastien Ogier and Julien Ingrassia entered the round with a ten-point lead in the World Championship for Drivers and Co-drivers. In the World Championship for Manufacturers, Hyundai Shell Mobis WRT held a fifteen-point lead over M-Sport Ford WRT.

=== Entry list ===
The following crews were entered into the rally. The final entry list consisted of fourteen World Rally Cars, seventeen World Rally Championship-2 entries, and fourteen entries in the World Rally Championship-3. All of the World Rally Championship-3 drivers and co-drivers were eligible to score points in the Junior World Rally Championship.

No.	Entrant	Driver	Co-Driver	Car	Tyre
World Rally Car entries
1	(United Kingdom) M-Sport Ford WRT	(France) Sébastien Ogier	(France) Julien Ingrassia	Ford Fiesta WRC	MI
2	(United Kingdom) M-Sport Ford WRT	(United Kingdom) Elfyn Evans	(United Kingdom) Daniel Barritt	Ford Fiesta WRC	MI
3	(United Kingdom) M-Sport Ford WRT	(Finland) Teemu Suninen	(Finland) Mikko Markkula	Ford Fiesta WRC	MI
4	(South Korea) Hyundai Shell Mobis WRT	(Norway) Andreas Mikkelsen	(Norway) Anders Jæger-Synnevaag	Hyundai i20 Coupe WRC	MI
5	(South Korea) Hyundai Shell Mobis WRT	(Belgium) Thierry Neuville	(Belgium) Nicolas Gilsoul	Hyundai i20 Coupe WRC	MI
6	(South Korea) Hyundai Shell Mobis WRT	(New Zealand) Hayden Paddon	(United Kingdom) Sebastian Marshall	Hyundai i20 Coupe WRC	MI
7	(Japan) Toyota Gazoo Racing WRT	(Finland) Jari-Matti Latvala	(Finland) Miikka Anttila	Toyota Yaris WRC	MI
8	(Japan) Toyota Gazoo Racing WRT	(Estonia) Ott Tänak	(Estonia) Martin Järveoja	Toyota Yaris WRC	MI
9	(Japan) Toyota Gazoo Racing WRT	(Finland) Esapekka Lappi	(Finland) Janne Ferm	Toyota Yaris WRC	MI
10	(France) Citroën Total Abu Dhabi WRT	(United Kingdom) Kris Meeke	(Republic of Ireland) Paul Nagle	Citroën C3 WRC	MI
11	(France) Citroën Total Abu Dhabi WRT	(Republic of Ireland) Craig Breen	(United Kingdom) Scott Martin	Citroën C3 WRC	MI
12	(France) Citroën Total Abu Dhabi WRT	(Norway) Mads Østberg	(Norway) Torstein Eriksen	Citroën C3 WRC	MI
16	(South Korea) Hyundai Shell Mobis WRT	(Spain) Dani Sordo	(Spain) Carlos del Barrio	Hyundai i20 Coupe WRC	MI
21	(Saudi Arabia) Yazeed Racing	(Saudi Arabia) Yazeed Al-Rajhi	(United Kingdom) Michael Orr	Ford Fiesta RS WRC	MI
World Rally Championship-2 entries
31	(Czech Republic) Škoda Motorsport	(Sweden) Pontus Tidemand	(Sweden) Jonas Andersson	Škoda Fabia R5	MI
32	(United Kingdom) Gus Greensmith	(United Kingdom) Gus Greensmith	(United Kingdom) Craig Parry	Ford Fiesta R5	MI
33	(Chile) Pedro Heller	(Chile) Pedro Heller	(Argentina) Pablo Olmos	Ford Fiesta R5	MI
34	(Finland) Tommi Mäkinen Racing	(Japan) Takamoto Katsuta	(Finland) Marko Salminen	Ford Fiesta R5	P
35	(South Korea) Hyundai Motorsport	(Finland) Jari Huttunen	(Finland) Antti Linnaketo	Hyundai i20 R5	MI
36	(Italy) ACI Team Italia	(Italy) Fabio Andolfi	(Italy) Simone Scattolin	Škoda Fabia R5	P
37	(Finland) Printsport	(Poland) Łukasz Pieniążek	(Poland) Przemysław Mazur	Škoda Fabia R5	MI
38	(Spain) Nil Solans	(Spain) Nil Solans	(Spain) Miquel Ibañez Sotos	Ford Fiesta R5	DM
39	(Italy) BRC Racing Team	(France) Pierre-Louis Loubet	(France) Vincent Landais	Hyundai i20 R5	MI
40	(Finland) Tommi Mäkinen Racing	(Japan) Hiroki Arai	(Australia) Glenn MacNeall	Ford Fiesta R5	MI
41	(Netherlands) Kevin Abbring	(Netherlands) Kevin Abbring	(Belgium) Pieter Tsjoen	Ford Fiesta R5	P
42	(France) Citroën Total Rallye Team	(France) Stéphane Lefebvre	(France) Gabin Moreau	Citroën C3 R5	MI
43	(Czech Republic) Škoda Motorsport	(Finland) Juuso Nordgren	(Finland) Tapio Suominen	Škoda Fabia R5	MI
44	(Finland) Max Vatanen	(Finland) Max Vatanen	(France) Christopher Guieu	Hyundai i20 R5	MI
45	(Turkey) Castrol Ford Team Türkiye	(Turkey) Murat Bostanci	(Turkey) Onur Vatansever	Ford Fiesta R5	P
46	(Romania) Simone Tempestini	(Romania) Simone Tempestini	(Romania) Sergiu Itu	Ford Fiesta R5	P
47	(Italy) Motorsport Italia	(Mexico) Benito Guerra	(Spain) Borja Rozada	Škoda Fabia R5	P
World Rally Championship-3 entries
61	(Sweden) Denis Rådström	(Sweden) Denis Rådström^{‡}	(Sweden) Johan Johansson	Ford Fiesta R2T	P
62	Équipe de France FFSA Rally	(France) Jean-Baptiste Franceschi^{‡}	(France) Romain Courbon	Ford Fiesta R2T	P
63	(Sweden) Emil Bergkvist	(Sweden) Emil Bergkvist^{‡}	(Sweden) Joakim Sjöberg	Ford Fiesta R2T	P
64	(France) Terry Folb	(France) Terry Folb^{‡}	(France) Kevin Bronner	Ford Fiesta R2T	P
65	(Republic of Ireland) Callum Devine	(Republic of Ireland) Callum Devine^{‡}	(Republic of Ireland) Brian Hoy	Ford Fiesta R2T	P
66	(Germany) ADAC Sachsen	(Germany) Julius Tannert^{‡}	(Austria) Jürgen Heigl	Ford Fiesta R2T	P
67	(Estonia) OT Racing	(Estonia) Ken Torn^{‡}	(Estonia) Kuldar Sikk	Ford Fiesta R2T	P
68	(Italy) ACI Team Italia	(Italy) Luca Bottarelli^{‡}	(Italy) Manuel Fenoli	Ford Fiesta R2T	P
69	(Chile) Emilio Fernández	(Chile) Emilio Fernández^{‡}	(Chile) Joaquin Riquelme	Ford Fiesta R2T	P
70	(Turkey) Castrol Ford Team Turkiye	(Turkey) Bugra Banaz^{‡}	(Turkey) Burak Erdener	Ford Fiesta R2T	P
71	(New Zealand) Holder Brothers Racing	(New Zealand) David Holder^{‡}	(New Zealand) Jason Farmer	Ford Fiesta R2T	P
72	(United Kingdom) Tom Williams	(United Kingdom) Tom Williams^{‡}	(United Kingdom) Phil Hall	Ford Fiesta R2T	P
73	(Italy) ACI Team Italia	(Italy) Enrico Oldrati^{‡}	(Italy) Danilo Fappani	Ford Fiesta R2T	P
74	(Italy) Umberto Accornero	(Italy) Umberto Accornero^{‡}	(Italy) Maurizio Barone	Ford Fiesta R2T	P
Other major entries
81	Team Hyundai Portugal	(Portugal) Armindo Araújo	(Portugal) Luis Ramalho	Hyundai i20 R5	MI

Notes

- ^‡ — Driver and co-driver are eligible to score points in the FIA Junior World Rally Championship.

== Report ==
=== Pre-event ===
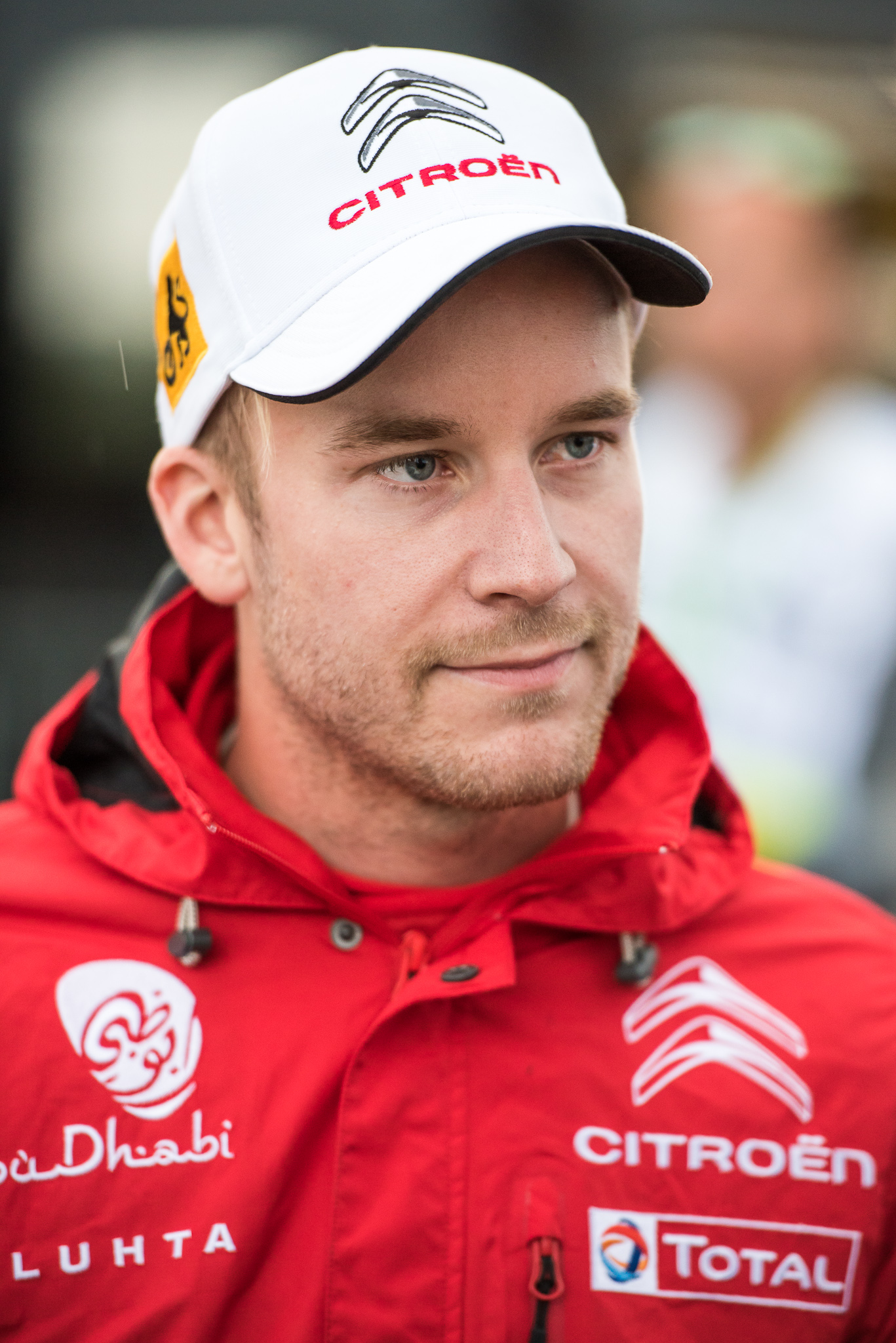
Mads Østberg returned to the championship with Citroën in this rally.

Haydon Paddon and Sebastian Marshall returned to the championship with Hyundai. Paddon and Marshall had previously contested Rally Sweden before handing the car over to Dani Sordo and Carlos del Barrio for the next three events as part of a drive-sharing agreement in the team. As part of the agreement, Paddon and Sordo will contest seven events each, leading Hyundai to enter a fourth i20 Coupe WRC in Rally de Portugal to allow both crews to compete in seven rallies.

Mads Østberg and Torstein Eriksen returned to the championship, making their second appearance of the season with Citroën.

=== Thursday ===
Argentina winner Ott Tänak defeated Andreas Mikkelsen, who set fifth fastest time, in front of 30,000 fans in their head-to-head heat and topped his Yaris by 0.4 second. Defending world champion Sébastien Ogier and his Fiesta teammate Teemu Suninen tied in second, while Kris Meeke finished fourth. Last year runner-up Thierry Neuville completed in sixth, while Elfyn Evans was another one tenth of a second behind. Dani Sordo finished eighth in the fourth Hyundai. Returned Mads Østberg was in ninth, while Esapekka Lappi completed the top ten.

=== Friday ===
It was full of dramas in Friday of the rally. Ott Tänak first retired from the rally due to hitting a rock, which damaged his engine's cooling system. Next was his teammate Jari-Matti Latvala, who hit a rock and broke his front right suspension. Defending world champion Sébastien Ogier was fourth on the road until he fell off the road in his Fiesta. Hayden Paddon was the rally reader after SS6. However, a heavy impact damaged the front left of his Hyundai i20 and blocked the stage. Teammate Andreas Mikkelsen suffered power steering and engine issues and retired from the day.

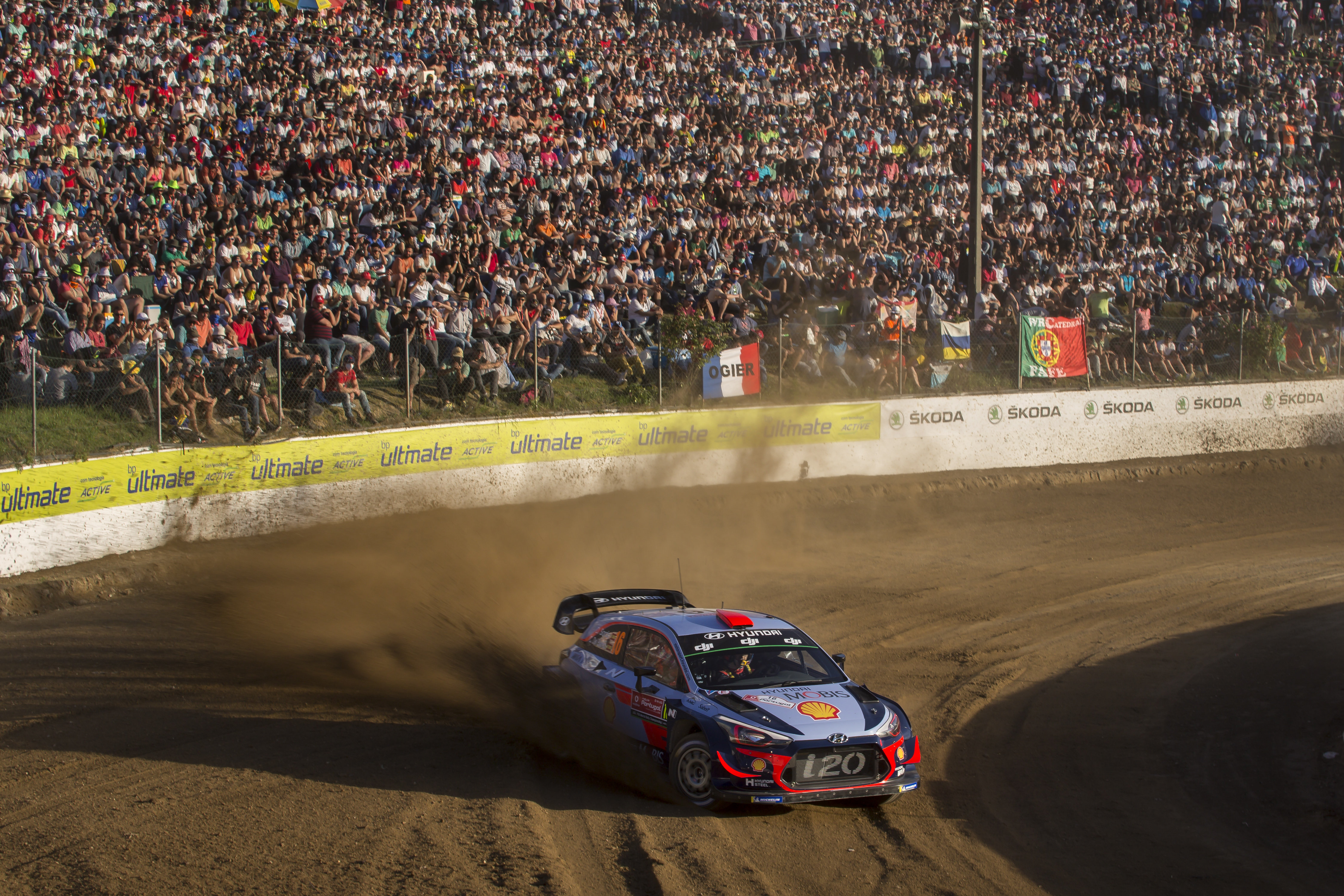
Dani Sordo and Carlos del Barrio during the Lousada Super Special Stage.

Back to the front, Thierry Neuville was the rally reader. Elfyn Evans completed the day in the second place, 17.7 seconds off the lead. Dani Sordo, who had to slow down as his soft tyres became worn, was another 6.6 seconds behind. Teemu Suninen finished in fourth after a consistent performance. Esapekka Lappi and Mads Østberg separated by two and a half seconds in fifth and sixth. Tyre troubles forced Kris Meeke to drive the final Porto stages with just a wheel rim on the rear left of his car and he conceded a minute. Teammate Craig Breen dropped from third to eighth after a puncture. WRC-2 category leader Gus Greensmith and Łukasz Pieniążek completed the top ten.

=== Saturday ===
Kris Meeke started the day in seventh, but he crashed his Citroën C3 on SS12. Fortunately, both Meeke and co-driver Paul Nagle were unhurt. Thierry Neuville ended the day with a 39.8-second advantage over Elfyn Evans. Chances are that the Hyundai star is going to snatch the position of the championship leader from the defending world champion Sébastien Ogier, who ran under WRC-2 rule as well as Andreas Mikkelsen and Jari-Matti Latvala today, after the rally. Teemu Suninen just edged Dani Sordo, who stiffened his Hyundai i20's set-up, by 4.7 seconds in third after the Spaniard received a 10-second penalty from stewards late on Saturday night for dislodging two bales on a Porto street stage roundabout in SS8 on Friday night. Esapekka Lappi completed the day in fifth in a Toyota, another 11.1 seconds behind. Mads Østberg and teammate Craig Breen, who had to clear the road today, completed the day in sixth and seventh place respectively, followed by WRC-2 leader Pontus Tidemand, Łukasz Pieniążek and Stéphane Lefebvre.

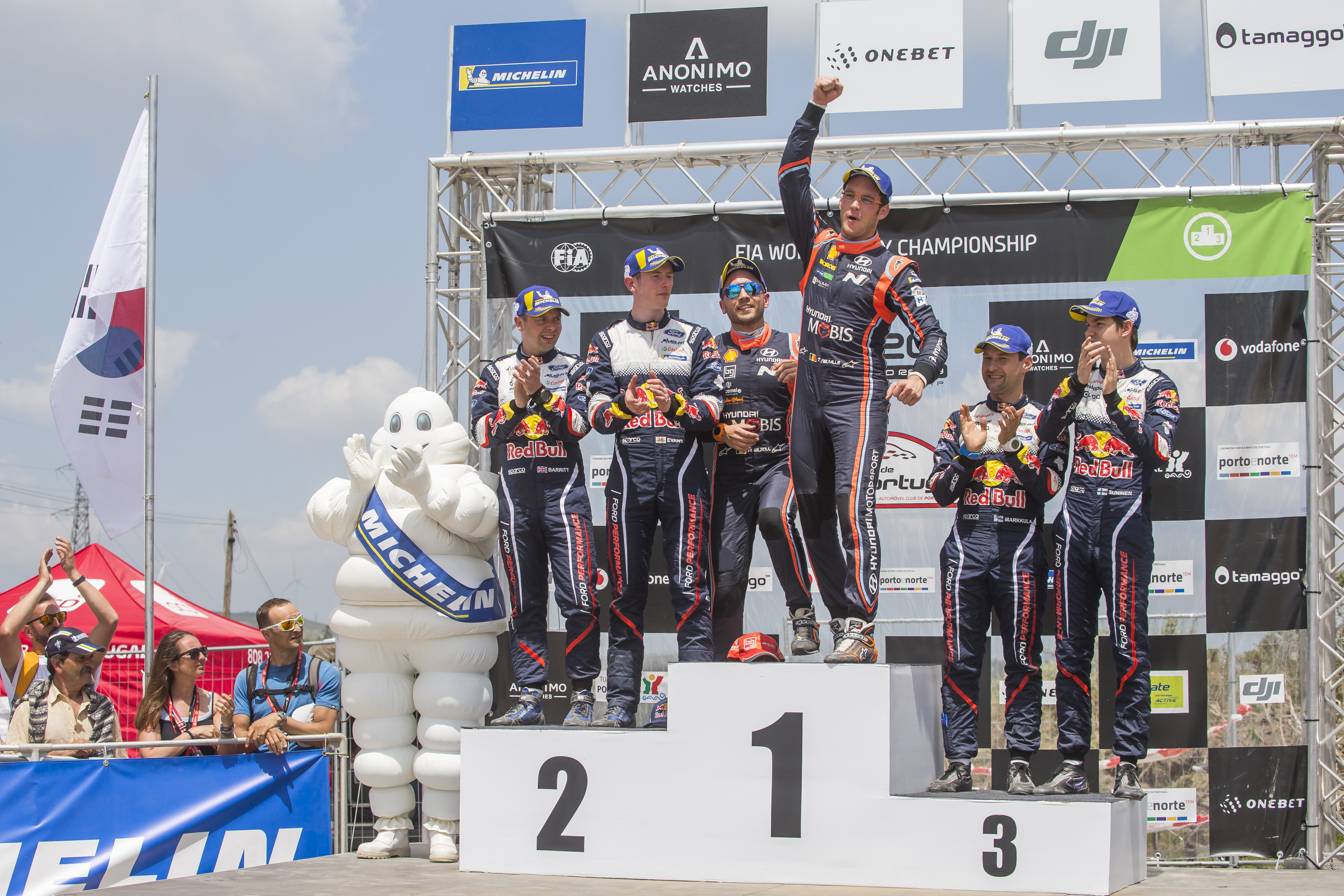
Top three crews celebrating on the podium.

=== Sunday ===
Thierry Neuville took his first Portugal and eighth WRC victory after a four-day battle. Because of championship leader Sébastien Ogier did not manage to score any points, he now leads the championship over the defending world championship by nineteen points. Ford teammates Elfyn Evans and Teemu Suninen, who reach his first podium, finished second and third to help the team narrow the gap to Hyundai to thirteen points. Esapekka Lappi, who took another Power Stage win, overtook Dani Sordo to completed the event in fourth in a Yaris. However, he was given a ten-second penalty for displacing one of the three dividing bales on SS9's third roundabout later on. As a result, he lost his fourth place to the Spaniard. Mads Østberg and teammate Craig Breen finished in sixth and seventh overall, which brought some valuable points to Citroën, while WRC-2 leader Pontus Tidemand, Łukasz Pieniążek and Stéphane Lefebvre completed the leaderboard.

== Classification ==
=== Top ten finishers ===
The following crews finished the rally in each class's top ten. (Note: Only crews contesting the World Rally Championship, World Rally Championship-2 and World Rally Championship-3 are listed.)

Position		No.	Driver	Co-driver	Entrant	Car	Time	Difference	Points	
Event	Class	No.	Driver	Co-driver	Entrant	Car	Time	Difference	Class	Stage
Overall classification
1	1	5	(Belgium) Thierry Neuville	(Belgium) Nicolas Gilsoul	(South Korea) Hyundai Shell Mobis WRT	Hyundai i20 Coupe WRC	3:49:46.6	0.0	25	4
2	2	2	(United Kingdom) Elfyn Evans	(United Kingdom) Daniel Barritt	(United Kingdom) M-Sport Ford WRT	Ford Fiesta WRC	3:50:26.6	+40.0	18	1
3	3	3	(Finland) Teemu Suninen	(Finland) Mikko Markkula	(United Kingdom) M-Sport Ford WRT	Ford Fiesta WRC	3:50:33.9	+47.3	15	2
4	4	16	(Spain) Dani Sordo	(Spain) Carlos del Barrio	(South Korea) Hyundai Shell Mobis WRT	Hyundai i20 Coupe WRC	3:50:47.5	+1:00.9	12	3
5	5	9	(Finland) Esapekka Lappi	(Finland) Janne Ferm	(Japan) Toyota Gazoo Racing WRT	Toyota Yaris WRC	3:50:51.3	+1:04.7	10	5
6	6	12	(Norway) Mads Østberg	(Norway) Torstein Eriksen	(France) Citroën Total Abu Dhabi WRT	Citroën C3 WRC	3:53:20.1	+3:33.5	8	0
7	7	11	(Republic of Ireland) Craig Breen	(United Kingdom) Scott Martin	(France) Citroën Total Abu Dhabi WRT	Citroën C3 WRC	3:55:09.6	+5:23.0	6	0
8	8	31	(Sweden) Pontus Tidemand	(Sweden) Jonas Andersson	(Czech Republic) Škoda Motorsport	Škoda Fabia R5	4:03:57.4	+14:10.8	4	0
9	9	37	(Poland) Łukasz Pieniążek	(Poland) Przemysław Mazur	(Finland) Printsport	Škoda Fabia R5	4:06:03.9	+16:17.3	2	0
10	10	42	(France) Stéphane Lefebvre	(France) Gabin Moreau	(France) Citroën Total Rallye Team	Citroën C3 R5	4:06:20.9	+16:34.3	1	0
World Rally Championship-2
8	1	31	(Sweden) Pontus Tidemand	(Sweden) Jonas Andersson	(Czech Republic) Škoda Motorsport	Škoda Fabia R5	4:03:57.4	0.0	25	—
9	2	37	(Poland) Łukasz Pieniążek	(Poland) Przemysław Mazur	(Finland) Printsport	Škoda Fabia R5	4:06:03.9	+2:06.5	18	—
10	3	42	(France) Stéphane Lefebvre	(France) Gabin Moreau	(France) Citroën Total Rallye Team	Citroën C3 R5	4:06:20.9	+2:23.5	15	—
11	4	39	(France) Pierre-Louis Loubet	(France) Vincent Landais	(Italy) BRC Racing Team	Hyundai i20 R5	4:07:07.9	+3:10.5	12	—
12	5	40	(Japan) Hiroki Arai	(Australia) Glenn MacNeall	(Finland) Tommi Mäkinen Racing	Ford Fiesta R5	4:09:29.0	+5:31.6	10	—
13	6	43	(Finland) Juuso Nordgren	(Finland) Tapio Suominen	(Czech Republic) Škoda Motorsport	Škoda Fabia R5	4:09:38.5	+5:41.1	8	—
15	7	47	(Mexico) Benito Guerra	(Spain) Borja Rozada	(Italy) Motorsport Italia	Škoda Fabia R5	4:13:01.9	+9:04.5	6	—
18	8	32	(United Kingdom) Gus Greensmith	(United Kingdom) Craig Parry	(United Kingdom) Gus Greensmith	Ford Fiesta R5	4:16:02.0	+12:04.6	4	—
19	9	38	(Spain) Nil Solans	(Spain) Miquel Ibañez Sotos	(Spain) Nil Solans	Ford Fiesta R5	4:17:11.1	+13:13.7	2	—
20	10	33	(Chile) Pedro Heller	(Argentina) Pablo Olmos	(Chile) Pedro Heller	Ford Fiesta R5	4:18:43.0	+14:45.6	1	—
World Rally Championship-3
21	1	61	(Sweden) Denis Rådström	(Sweden) Johan Johansson	(Sweden) Denis Rådström	Ford Fiesta R2T	4:26:51.2	0.0	25	—
27	2	73	(Italy) Enrico Oldrati	(Italy) Danilo Fappani	(Italy) ACI Team Italia	Ford Fiesta R2T	4:41:49.0	+14:57.8	18	—
28	3	71	(New Zealand) Jason Farmer	(New Zealand) David Holder	(New Zealand) Holder Brothers Racing	Ford Fiesta R2T	4:44:18.5	+17:27.3	15	—
32	4	70	(Turkey) Bugra Banaz	(Turkey) Burak Erdener	(Turkey) Castrol Ford Team Turkiye	Ford Fiesta R2T	4:51:49.9	+24:58.7	12	—
34	5	63	(Sweden) Emil Bergkvist	(Sweden) Joakim Sjöberg	(Sweden) Emil Bergkvist	Ford Fiesta R2T	4:54:01.3	+27:10.1	10	—
35	6	68	(Italy) Luca Bottarelli	(Italy) Manuel Fenoli	(Italy) ACI Team Italia	Ford Fiesta R2T	4:54:34.1	+27:42.9	8	—
37	7	72	(United Kingdom) Tom Williams	(United Kingdom) Phil Hall	(United Kingdom) Tom Williams	Ford Fiesta R2T	5:10:33.9	+43:42.7	6	—
41	8	74	(Italy) Umberto Accornero	(Italy) Maurizio Barone	(Italy) Umberto Accornero	Ford Fiesta R2T	5:16:45.4	+49:54.2	4	—
42	9	62	(France) Jean-Baptiste Franceschi	(France) Romain Courbon	Équipe de France FFSA Rally	Ford Fiesta R2T	5:17:01.6	+50:10.4	2	—
43	10	66	(Germany) Julius Tannert	(Austria) Jürgen Heigl	(Germany) ADAC Sachsen	Ford Fiesta R2T	5:25:43.4	+58:52.2	1	—
Junior World Rally Championship
21	1	61	(Sweden) Denis Rådström	(Sweden) Johan Johansson	(Sweden) Denis Rådström	Ford Fiesta R2T	4:26:51.2	0.0	25	3
27	2	73	(Italy) Enrico Oldrati	(Italy) Danilo Fappani	(Italy) ACI Team Italia	Ford Fiesta R2T	4:41:49.0	+14:57.8	18	0
28	3	71	(New Zealand) Jason Farmer	(New Zealand) David Holder	(New Zealand) Holder Brothers Racing	Ford Fiesta R2T	4:44:18.5	+17:27.3	15	0
32	4	70	(Turkey) Bugra Banaz	(Turkey) Burak Erdener	(Turkey) Castrol Ford Team Turkiye	Ford Fiesta R2T	4:51:49.9	+24:58.7	12	0
34	5	63	(Sweden) Emil Bergkvist	(Sweden) Joakim Sjöberg	(Sweden) Emil Bergkvist	Ford Fiesta R2T	4:54:01.3	+27:10.1	10	9
35	6	68	(Italy) Luca Bottarelli	(Italy) Manuel Fenoli	(Italy) ACI Team Italia	Ford Fiesta R2T	4:54:34.1	+27:42.9	8	1
37	7	72	(United Kingdom) Tom Williams	(United Kingdom) Phil Hall	(United Kingdom) Tom Williams	Ford Fiesta R2T	5:10:33.9	+43:42.7	6	0
41	8	74	(Italy) Umberto Accornero	(Italy) Maurizio Barone	(Italy) Umberto Accornero	Ford Fiesta R2T	5:16:45.4	+49:54.2	4	0
42	9	62	(France) Jean-Baptiste Franceschi	(France) Romain Courbon	Équipe de France FFSA Rally	Ford Fiesta R2T	5:17:01.6	+50:10.4	2	0
43	10	66	(Germany) Julius Tannert	(Austria) Jürgen Heigl	(Germany) ADAC Sachsen	Ford Fiesta R2T	5:25:43.4	+58:52.2	1	1

=== Other notable finishers ===
The following notable crews finished the rally outside top ten.

Position		No.	Driver	Co-driver	Entrant	Car	Class	Time	Points
Event	Class	No.	Driver	Co-driver	Entrant	Car	Class	Time	Stage
16	16	4	(Norway) Andreas Mikkelsen	(Norway) Anders Jæger-Synnevaag	(South Korea) Hyundai Shell Mobis WRT	Hyundai i20 Coupe WRC	WRC	4:38:36.9	0
23	11	45	(Turkey) Murat Bostanci	(Turkey) Onur Vatansever	(Turkey) Castrol Ford Team Türkiye	Ford Fiesta R5	WRC-2	4:36:55.0	—
24	24	7	(Finland) Jari-Matti Latvala	(Finland) Miikka Anttila	(Japan) Toyota Gazoo Racing WRT	Toyota Yaris WRC	WRC	4:14:31.0	0
25	12	35	(Finland) Jari Huttunen	(Finland) Antti Linnaketo	(South Korea) Hyundai Motorsport	Hyundai i20 R5	WRC-2	4:39:17.5	—
26	13	34	(Japan) Takamoto Katsuta	(Finland) Marko Salminen	(Finland) Tommi Mäkinen Racing	Ford Fiesta R5	WRC-2	4:39:22.6	—
29	14	44	(Finland) Max Vatanen	(France) Christopher Guieu	(Finland) Max Vatanen	Hyundai i20 R5	WRC-2	4:47:09.1	—
30	15	36	(Italy) Fabio Andolfi	(Italy) Simone Scattolin	(Italy) ACI Team Italia	Škoda Fabia R5	WRC-2	4:48:13.7	—
36	16	46	(Romania) Simone Tempestini	(Romania) Sergiu Itu	(Romania) Simone Tempestini	Ford Fiesta R5	WRC-2	4:56:21.6	—
44	11	69	(Chile) Emilio Fernández	(Chile) Joaquin Riquelme	(Chile) Emilio Fernández	Ford Fiesta R2T	J-WRC	5:27:19.3	0
44	11	69	(Chile) Emilio Fernández	(Chile) Joaquin Riquelme	(Chile) Emilio Fernández	Ford Fiesta R2T	WRC-3	5:27:19.3	—

=== Special stages ===
Overall classification
Day	Stage	Name	Length	Winner	Car	Time	Class leader
17 May	—	Paredes [Shakedown]	4.60 km	(Finland) Jari-Matti Latvala	Toyota Yaris WRC	3:03.5	—N/a
17 May	SS1	Lousada	3.36 km	(Estonia) Ott Tänak	Toyota Yaris WRC	2:34.3	(Estonia) Ott Tänak
18 May	SS2	Viana do Castelo 1	26.73 km	(New Zealand) Hayden Paddon	Hyundai i20 Coupe WRC	15:29.3	(New Zealand) Hayden Paddon
18 May	SS3	Caminha 1	18.11 km	(United Kingdom) Kris Meeke	Citroën C3 WRC	10:35.1	(United Kingdom) Kris Meeke
18 May	SS4	Ponte de Lima 1	27.54 km	(Spain) Dani Sordo	Hyundai i20 Coupe WRC	19:15.5	(Spain) Dani Sordo
18 May	SS5	Viana do Castelo 2	26.73 km	(United Kingdom) Kris Meeke	Citroën C3 WRC	15:31.4	(United Kingdom) Kris Meeke
18 May	SS6	Caminha 2	18.11 km	(Belgium) Thierry Neuville (Republic of Ireland) Craig Breen	Hyundai i20 Coupe WRC; Citroën C3 WRC	10:35.5	(New Zealand) Hayden Paddon
18 May	SS7	Ponte de Lima 2	27.54 km	(Belgium) Thierry Neuville	Hyundai i20 Coupe WRC	19:24.7	(Belgium) Thierry Neuville
18 May	SS8	Porto Street Stage 1	1.95 km	(Belgium) Thierry Neuville	Hyundai i20 Coupe WRC	1:48.7	(Belgium) Thierry Neuville
18 May	SS9	Porto Street Stage 2	1.95 km	(Belgium) Thierry Neuville	Hyundai i20 Coupe WRC	1:46.8	(Belgium) Thierry Neuville
19 May	SS10	Vieira do Minho 1	17.50 km	(Finland) Jari-Matti Latvala	Toyota Yaris WRC	10:52.2	(Belgium) Thierry Neuville
19 May	SS11	Cabeceiras de Basto 1	22.22 km	(United Kingdom) Elfyn Evans	Ford Fiesta WRC	13:35.0	(Belgium) Thierry Neuville
19 May	SS12	Amarante 1	37.60 km	(Belgium) Thierry Neuville	Hyundai i20 Coupe WRC	24:56.8	(Belgium) Thierry Neuville
19 May	SS13	Vieira do Minho 2	17.50 km	(United Kingdom) Elfyn Evans	Ford Fiesta WRC	10:48.6	(Belgium) Thierry Neuville
19 May	SS14	Cabeceiras de Basto 2	22.22 km	(Finland) Jari-Matti Latvala	Toyota Yaris WRC	13:41.3	(Belgium) Thierry Neuville
19 May	SS15	Amarante 2	37.60 km	(France) Sébastien Ogier	Ford Fiesta WRC	24:47.7	(Belgium) Thierry Neuville
20 May	SS16	Montim 1	8.64 km	(Finland) Esapekka Lappi	Toyota Yaris WRC	5:47.4	(Belgium) Thierry Neuville
20 May	SS17	Fafe 1	11.18 km	(France) Sébastien Ogier	Ford Fiesta WRC	6:40.7	(Belgium) Thierry Neuville
20 May	SS18	Luílhas	11.89 km	(Finland) Jari-Matti Latvala	Toyota Yaris WRC	8:09.2	(Belgium) Thierry Neuville
20 May	SS19	Montim 2	8.64 km	(Finland) Teemu Suninen	Ford Fiesta WRC	5:41.3	(Belgium) Thierry Neuville
20 May	SS20	Fafe 2 [Power stage]	11.18 km	(Finland) Esapekka Lappi	Toyota Yaris WRC	6:33.2	(Belgium) Thierry Neuville
World Rally Championship-2
17 May	—	Paredes [Shakedown]	4.60 km	(Sweden) Pontus Tidemand	Škoda Fabia R5	3:14.5	—N/a
17 May	SS1	Lousada	3.36 km	(Sweden) Pontus Tidemand (Finland) Juuso Nordgren	Škoda Fabia R5; Škoda Fabia R5	2:40.5	(Sweden) Pontus Tidemand (Finland) Juuso Nordgren
18 May	SS2	Viana do Castelo 1	26.73 km	(France) Stéphane Lefebvre	Citroën C3 R5	16:20.7	(France) Stéphane Lefebvre
18 May	SS3	Caminha 1	18.11 km	(United Kingdom) Gus Greensmith	Ford Fiesta R5	11:16.5	(France) Stéphane Lefebvre
18 May	SS4	Ponte de Lima 1	27.54 km	(Sweden) Pontus Tidemand	Škoda Fabia R5	20:07.1	(France) Stéphane Lefebvre
18 May	SS5	Viana do Castelo 2	26.73 km	(Sweden) Pontus Tidemand	Škoda Fabia R5	16:18.0	(United Kingdom) Gus Greensmith
18 May	SS6	Caminha 2	18.11 km	(United Kingdom) Gus Greensmith	Ford Fiesta R5	11:13.3	(United Kingdom) Gus Greensmith
18 May	SS7	Ponte de Lima 2	27.54 km	Stage interrupted			
18 May	SS8	Porto Street Stage 1	1.95 km	(Sweden) Pontus Tidemand	Škoda Fabia R5	1:53.2	(United Kingdom) Gus Greensmith
18 May	SS9	Porto Street Stage 2	1.95 km	(Sweden) Pontus Tidemand	Škoda Fabia R5	1:52.2	(United Kingdom) Gus Greensmith
19 May	SS10	Vieira do Minho 1	17.50 km	(Sweden) Pontus Tidemand	Škoda Fabia R5	11:25.2	(France) Stéphane Lefebvre
19 May	SS11	Cabeceiras de Basto 1	22.22 km	(Sweden) Pontus Tidemand	Škoda Fabia R5	14:12.9	(France) Stéphane Lefebvre
19 May	SS12	Amarante 1	37.6p km	(Sweden) Pontus Tidemand	Škoda Fabia R5	26:08.9	(France) Stéphane Lefebvre
19 May	SS13	Vieira do Minho 2	17.50 km	(Sweden) Pontus Tidemand	Škoda Fabia R5	11:16.9	(France) Stéphane Lefebvre
19 May	SS14	Cabeceiras de Basto 2	22.22 km	(Sweden) Pontus Tidemand	Škoda Fabia R5	14:09.4	(France) Stéphane Lefebvre
19 May	SS15	Amarante 2	37.60 km	(Sweden) Pontus Tidemand	Škoda Fabia R5	25:57.0	(Sweden) Pontus Tidemand
20 May	SS16	Montim 1	8.64 km	(Sweden) Pontus Tidemand	Škoda Fabia R5	6:00.8	(Sweden) Pontus Tidemand
20 May	SS17	Fafe 1	11.18 km	(United Kingdom) Gus Greensmith	Ford Fiesta R5	7:01.9	(Sweden) Pontus Tidemand
20 May	SS18	Luílhas	11.89 km	(United Kingdom) Gus Greensmith	Ford Fiesta R5	8:27.5	(Sweden) Pontus Tidemand
20 May	SS19	Montim 2	8.64 km	(Sweden) Pontus Tidemand	Škoda Fabia R5	5:56.3	(Sweden) Pontus Tidemand
20 May	SS20	Fafe 2	11.18 km	(United Kingdom) Gus Greensmith	Ford Fiesta R5	6:57.6	(Sweden) Pontus Tidemand
World Rally Championship-3 / Junior World Rally Championship
17 May	—	Paredes [Shakedown]	4.60 km	(Sweden) Emil Bergkvist	Ford Fiesta R2T	3:41.0	—N/a
17 May	SS1	Lousada	3.36 km	(Sweden) Emil Bergkvist	Ford Fiesta R2T	2:57.4	(Sweden) Emil Bergkvist
18 May	SS2	Viana do Castelo 1	26.73 km	(Sweden) Emil Bergkvist	Ford Fiesta R2T	18:11.0	(Sweden) Emil Bergkvist
18 May	SS3	Caminha 1	18.11 km	(Sweden) Emil Bergkvist	Ford Fiesta R2T	12:28.0	(Sweden) Emil Bergkvist
18 May	SS4	Ponte de Lima 1	27.54 km	(Sweden) Emil Bergkvist	Ford Fiesta R2T	22:13.2	(Sweden) Emil Bergkvist
18 May	SS5	Viana do Castelo 2	26.73 km	(Sweden) Emil Bergkvist	Ford Fiesta R2T	18:07.9	(Sweden) Emil Bergkvist
18 May	SS6	Caminha 2	18.11 km	(Sweden) Dennis Rådström	Ford Fiesta R2T	12:26.3	(Sweden) Emil Bergkvist
18 May	SS7	Ponte de Lima 2	27.54 km	Stage interrupted			
18 May	SS8	Porto Street Stage 1	1.95 km	(Estonia) Ken Torn (Italy) Luca Bottarelli	Ford Fiesta R2T; Ford Fiesta R2T	2:06.1	(Sweden) Emil Bergkvist
18 May	SS9	Porto Street Stage 2	1.95 km	(Estonia) Ken Torn	Ford Fiesta R2T	2:03.4	(Sweden) Dennis Rådström
19 May	SS10	Vieira do Minho 1	17.50 km	(Sweden) Emil Bergkvist	Ford Fiesta R2T	12:36.4	(Sweden) Dennis Rådström
19 May	SS11	Cabeceiras de Basto 1	22.22 km	(Sweden) Emil Bergkvist	Ford Fiesta R2T	15:46.4	(Sweden) Emil Bergkvist
19 May	SS12	Amarante 1	37.60 km	Stage interrupted			
19 May	SS13	Vieira do Minho 2	17.50 km	(Sweden) Dennis Rådström	Ford Fiesta R2T	12:36.7	(Sweden) Dennis Rådström
19 May	SS14	Cabeceiras de Basto 2	22.22 km	(Germany) Julius Tannert	Ford Fiesta R2T	15:47.7	(Sweden) Dennis Rådström
19 May	SS15	Amarante 2	37.60 km	(Sweden) Dennis Rådström	Ford Fiesta R2T	29:16.1	(Sweden) Dennis Rådström
20 May	SS16	Montim 1	8.64 km	(Estonia) Ken Torn	Ford Fiesta R2T	6:32.0	(Sweden) Dennis Rådström
20 May	SS17	Fafe 1	11.18 km	(Sweden) Emil Bergkvist	Ford Fiesta R2T	7:47.8	(Sweden) Dennis Rådström
20 May	SS18	Luílhas	11.89 km	(Sweden) Emil Bergkvist	Ford Fiesta R2T	9:15.1	(Sweden) Dennis Rådström
20 May	SS19	Montim 2	8.64 km	(Sweden) Emil Bergkvist	Ford Fiesta R2T	6:32.4	(Sweden) Dennis Rådström
20 May	SS20	Fafe 2	11.18 km	Stage interrupted			

=== Power stage ===
The Power stage was an 11.18 km stage at the end of the rally. Additional World Championship points were awarded to the five fastest crews.

Pos.	Driver	Co-driver	Car	Time	Diff.	Pts.
1	(Finland) Esapekka Lappi	(Finland) Janne Ferm	Toyota Yaris WRC	6:33.2	0.0	5
2	(Belgium) Thierry Neuville	(Belgium) Nicolas Gilsoul	Hyundai i20 Coupe WRC	6:35.1	+1.9	4
3	(Spain) Dani Sordo	(Spain) Carlos del Barrio	Hyundai i20 Coupe WRC	6:35.3	+2.1	3
4	(Finland) Teemu Suninen	(Finland) Mikko Markkula	Ford Fiesta WRC	6:36.5	+3.3	2
5	(United Kingdom) Elfyn Evans	(United Kingdom) Daniel Barritt	Ford Fiesta WRC	6:37.6	+4.4	1

=== J-WRC stage winning crews ===
Junior World Rally Championship crews scored additional points. Each of the fastest stage time was awarded with one bonus point.

Pos.	Driver	Co-driver	Car	Pts.
1	(Sweden) Emil Bergkvist	(Sweden) Joakim Sjöberg	Ford Fiesta R2T	10
2	(Sweden) Denis Rådström	(Sweden) Johan Johansson	Ford Fiesta R2T	3
2	(Estonia) Ken Torn	(Estonia) Kuldar Sikk	Ford Fiesta R2T	3
4	(Italy) Luca Bottarelli	(Italy) Manuel Fenoli	Ford Fiesta R2T	1
4	(Germany) Julius Tannert	(Austria) Jürgen Heigl	Ford Fiesta R2T	1

=== Penalties ===
The following notable crews were given time penalty during the rally.

Stage	No.	Driver	Co-driver	Entrant	Car	Class	Reason	Penalty
SS2	62	(France) Jean-Baptiste Franceschi	(France) Romain Courbon	(France) Jean-Baptiste Franceschi	Ford Fiesta R2T	WRC-3, JWRC	1 minute late	0:10
SS4	34	(Japan) Takamoto Katsuta	(Finland) Marko Salminen	(Finland) Tommi Mäkinen Racing	Ford Fiesta R5	WRC-2	2 minutes late	0:20
SS4	36	(Italy) Fabio Andolfi	(Italy) Simone Scattolin	(Italy) ACI Team Italia	Škoda Fabia R5	WRC-2	4 minutes late	0:40
SS5	21	(Saudi Arabia) Yazeed Al-Rajhi	(United Kingdom) Michael Orr	(Saudi Arabia) Yazeed Racing	Ford Fiesta R5	WRC	7 minutes late	1:10
SS6	35	(Finland) Jari Huttunen	(Finland) Antti Linnaketo	(South Korea) Hyundai Motorsport	Hyundai i20 R5	WRC-2	1 minute early	1:00
SS7	4	(Norway) Andreas Mikkelsen	(Norway) Anders Jæger-Synnevaag	(South Korea) Hyundai Shell Mobis WRT	Hyundai i20 Coupe WRC	WRC	7 minutes late	1:10
SS7	74	(Italy) Umberto Accornero	(Italy) Maurizio Barone	(Italy) Umberto Accornero	Ford Fiesta R2T	WRC-3, JWRC	6 minutes late	1:00
SS8	16	(Spain) Dani Sordo	(Spain) Carlos del Barrio	(South Korea) Hyundai Shell Mobis WRT	Hyundai i20 Coupe WRC	WRC	Stewards decision	0:10
SS8	32	(United Kingdom) Gus Greensmith	(United Kingdom) Craig Parry	(United Kingdom) Gus Greensmith	Ford Fiesta R5	WRC-2	Wrong route	0:30
SS9	9	(Finland) Esapekka Lappi	(Finland) Janne Ferm	(Japan) Toyota Gazoo Racing WRT	Toyota Yaris WRC	WRC	Stewards decision	0:10
SS15	35	(Finland) Jari Huttunen	(Finland) Antti Linnaketo	(South Korea) Hyundai Motorsport	Hyundai i20 R5	WRC-2	1 minute late	0:10
SS15	44	(Finland) Max Vatanen	(France) Christopher Guieu	(Finland) Max Vatanen	Hyundai i20 R5	WRC-2	9 minutes late	1:30
SS19	40	(Japan) Hiroki Arai	(Australia) Glenn MacNeall	(Finland) Tommi Mäkinen Racing	Ford Fiesta R5	WRC-2	1 minute late	0:10
SS19	44	(Finland) Max Vatanen	(France) Christopher Guieu	(Finland) Max Vatanen	Hyundai i20 R5	WRC-2	8 minutes late	1:20

=== Retirements ===
The following notable crews retired from the event. Under Rally2 regulations, they were eligible to re-enter the event starting from the next leg. Crews that re-entered were given an additional time penalty.

Stage	No.	Driver	Co-driver	Entrant	Car	Class	Cause	Re-entry
SS2	8	(Estonia) Ott Tänak	(Estonia) Martin Järveoja	(Japan) Toyota Gazoo Racing WRT	Toyota Yaris WRC	WRC	Cooling system	No
SS2	62	(France) Jean-Baptiste Franceschi	(France) Romain Courbon	Équipe de France FFSA Rally	Ford Fiesta R2T	WRC-3, JWRC	Mechanical	Yes
SS3	7	(Finland) Jari-Matti Latvala	(Finland) Miikka Anttila	(Japan) Toyota Gazoo Racing WRT	Toyota Yaris WRC	WRC	Suspension	Yes
SS3	64	(France) Terry Folb	(France) Kevin Bronner	(France) Terry Folb	Ford Fiesta R2T	WRC-3, JWRC	Engine	No
SS3	69	(Chile) Emilio Fernández	(Chile) Joaquin Riquelme	(Chile) Emilio Fernández	Ford Fiesta R2T	WRC-3J	Mechanical	Yes
SS5	36	(Italy) Fabio Andolfi	(Italy) Simone Scattolin	(Italy) ACI Team Italia	Ford Fiesta R5	WRC-2	Mechanical	Yes
SS5	44	(Finland) Max Vatanen	(France) Christopher Guieu	(Finland) Max Vatanen	Hyundai i20 R5	WRC-2	Mechanical	Yes
SS5	46	(Romania) Simone Tempestini	(Romania) Sergiu Itu	(Romania) Simone Tempestini	Ford Fiesta R5	WRC-2	Mechanical	Yes
SS5	66	(Germany) Julius Tannert	(Austria) Jürgen Heigl	(Germany) ADAC Sachsen	Ford Fiesta R2T	WRC-3, JWRC	Mechanical	Yes
SS6	1	(France) Sébastien Ogier	(France) Julien Ingrassia	(United Kingdom) M-Sport Ford WRT	Ford Fiesta WRC	WRC	Off road	Yes
SS6	34	(Japan) Takamoto Katsuta	(Finland) Marko Salminen	(Finland) Tommi Mäkinen Racing	Ford Fiesta R5	WRC-2	Mechanical	Yes
SS6	35	(Finland) Jari Huttunen	(Finland) Antti Linnaketo	(South Korea) Hyundai Motorsport	Hyundai i20 R5	WRC-2	Mechanical	Yes
SS7	6	(New Zealand) Hayden Paddon	(United Kingdom) Sebastian Marshall	(South Korea) Hyundai Shell Mobis WRT	Hyundai i20 Coupe WRC	WRC	Accident	No
SS7	4	(Norway) Andreas Mikkelsen	(Norway) Anders Jæger-Synnevaag	(South Korea) Hyundai Shell Mobis WRT	Hyundai i20 Coupe WRC	WRC	Engine	Yes
SS8	41	(Netherlands) Kevin Abbring	(Belgium) Pieter Tsjoen	(Netherlands) Kevin Abbring	Ford Fiesta R5	WRC-2	Mechanical	Yes
SS10	41	(Netherlands) Kevin Abbring	(Belgium) Pieter Tsjoen	(Netherlands) Kevin Abbring	Ford Fiesta R5	WRC-2	Mechanical	Yes
SS12	63	(Sweden) Emil Bergkvist	(Sweden) Joakim Sjöberg	(Sweden) Emil Bergkvist	Ford Fiesta R2T	WRC-3, JWRC	Mechanical	Yes
SS12	72	(United Kingdom) Tom Williams	(United Kingdom) Phil Hall	(United Kingdom) Tom Williams	Ford Fiesta R2T	WRC-3, JWRC	Mechanical	Yes
SS13	45	(Turkey) Murat Bostanci	(Turkey) Onur Vatansever	(Turkey) Castrol Ford Team Türkiye	Ford Fiesta R5	WRC-2	Mechanical	Yes
SS13	10	(United Kingdom) Kris Meeke	(Republic of Ireland) Paul Nagle	(France) Citroën Total Abu Dhabi WRT	Citroën C3 WRC	WRC	Off road	No
SS13	67	(Estonia) Ken Torn	(Estonia) Kuldar Sikk	(Estonia) OT Racing	Ford Fiesta R2T	WRC-3, JWRC	Mechanical	Yes
SS13	74	(Italy) Umberto Accornero	(Italy) Maurizio Barone	(Italy) Umberto Accornero	Ford Fiesta R2T	WRC-3, JWRC	Mechanical	Yes
SS14	68	(Italy) Luca Bottarelli	(Italy) Manuel Fenoli	(Italy) ACI Team Italia	Ford Fiesta R5	WRC-2	Mechanical	Yes
SS15	33	(Chile) Pedro Heller	(Argentina) Pablo Olmos	(Chile) Pedro Heller	Ford Fiesta R5	WRC-2	Mechanical	Yes
SS15	38	(Spain) Nil Solans	(Spain) Miquel Ibañez Sotos	(Spain) Nil Solans	Ford Fiesta R5	WRC-2	Mechanical	Yes
SS15	66	(Germany) Julius Tannert	(Austria) Jürgen Heigl	(Germany) ADAC Sachsen	Ford Fiesta R2T	WRC-3, JWRC	Mechanical	Yes
SS15	71	(New Zealand) David Holder	(New Zealand) Jason Farmer	(New Zealand) Holder Brothers Racing	Ford Fiesta R2T	WRC-3, JWRC	Mechanical	Yes
SS17	67	(Estonia) Ken Torn	(Estonia) Kuldar Sikk	(Estonia) OT Racing	Ford Fiesta R2T	WRC-3, JWRC	Rolled	No
SS18	21	(Saudi Arabia) Yazeed Al-Rajhi	(United Kingdom) Michael Orr	(Saudi Arabia) Yazeed Racing	Ford Fiesta RS WRC	WRC	Mechanical	No
SS18	65	(Republic of Ireland) Callum Devine	(Republic of Ireland) Brian Hoy	(Republic of Ireland) Callum Devine	Ford Fiesta R2T	WRC-3, JWRC	Lost wheel	No
SS20	1	(France) Sébastien Ogier	(France) Julien Ingrassia	(United Kingdom) M-Sport Ford WRT	Ford Fiesta WRC	WRC	Withdrawn	No
SS20	41	(Netherlands) Kevin Abbring	(Belgium) Pieter Tsjoen	(Netherlands) Kevin Abbring	Ford Fiesta R5	WRC-2	Withdrawn	No

=== Championship standings after the rally ===
==== Drivers' championships ====
World Rally Championship
	Pos.	Driver	Points
1	1	(Belgium) Thierry Neuville	119
1	2	(France) Sébastien Ogier	100
	3	(Estonia) Ott Tänak	72
1	4	(Spain) Dani Sordo	60
2	5	(Finland) Esapekka Lappi	55
World Rally Championship-2
	Pos.	Driver	Points
	1	(Sweden) Pontus Tidemand	93
	2	(Czech Republic) Jan Kopecký	50
	3	(United Kingdom) Gus Greensmith	40
	4	(Chile) Pedro Heller	31
12	5	(Poland) Łukasz Pieniążek	30
World Rally Championship-3
	Pos.	Driver	Points
1	1	(Sweden) Denis Rådström	62
1	2	(Sweden) Emil Bergkvist	43
2	3	(France) Jean-Baptiste Franceschi	39
	4	(France) Terry Folb	28
	5	(Italy) Enrico Brazzoli	25
Junior World Rally Championship
	Pos.	Driver	Points
	1	(Sweden) Denis Rådström	74
1	2	(Sweden) Emil Bergkvist	58
1	3	(France) Jean-Baptiste Franceschi	47
	4	(France) Terry Folb	30
3	5	(Italy) Luca Bottarelli	20

==== Co-Drivers' championships ====
World Rally Championship
	Pos.	Co-Driver	Points
1	1	(Belgium) Nicolas Gilsoul	119
1	2	(France) Julien Ingrassia	100
	3	(Estonia) Martin Järveoja	72
1	4	(Spain) Carlos del Barrio	60
2	5	(Finland) Janne Ferm	55
World Rally Championship-2
	Pos.	Co-Driver	Points
	1	(Sweden) Jonas Andersson	93
	2	(Czech Republic) Pavel Dresler	50
	3	(United Kingdom) Craig Parry	40
	4	(Argentina) Pablo Olmos	31
12	5	(Poland) Przemysław Mazur	30
World Rally Championship-3
	Pos.	Co-Driver	Points
1	1	(Sweden) Johan Johansson	62
1	2	(France) Romain Courbon	39
	3	(Norway) Ola Fløene	33
	4	(France) Christopher Guieu	28
	5	(Italy) Luca Beltrame	25
Junior World Rally Championship
	Pos.	Co-Driver	Points
	1	(Sweden) Johan Johansson	74
	2	(France) Romain Courbon	47
	3	(Norway) Ola Fløene	38
	4	(France) Christopher Guieu	30
3	5	(Italy) Luca Beltrame	25

==== Manufacturers' and teams' championships ====
World Rally Championship
	Pos.	Manufacturer	Points
	1	(South Korea) Hyundai Shell Mobis WRT	175
	2	(United Kingdom) M-Sport Ford WRT	162
	3	(Japan) Toyota Gazoo Racing WRT	140
	4	(France) Citroën Total Abu Dhabi WRT	111
World Rally Championship-2
	Pos.	Team	Points
	1	(Czech Republic) Škoda Motorsport	93
	2	(Czech Republic) Škoda Motorsport II	50
	3	(Finland) Tommi Mäkinen Racing	45
1	4	(Finland) Printsport	43
1	5	(South Korea) Hyundai Motorsport	34
World Rally Championship-3
	Pos.	Team	Points
2	1	(Italy) ACI Team Italia	58
	2	(Germany) ADAC Sachsen	47
2	3	(Estonia) OT Racing	37
1	4	(Turkey) Castrol Ford Team Turkiye	30
1	5	(New Zealand) Holder Brothers Racing	28

== Notes ==
Previous rally: 2018 Rally Argentina	2018 FIA World Rally Championship	Next rally: 2018 Rally Italia Sardegna
Previous rally: 2017 Rally de Portugal	2018 Rally de Portugal	Next rally: 2019 Rally de Portugal
