= Pontus Tidemand =

Swedish rally driver (born 1990)

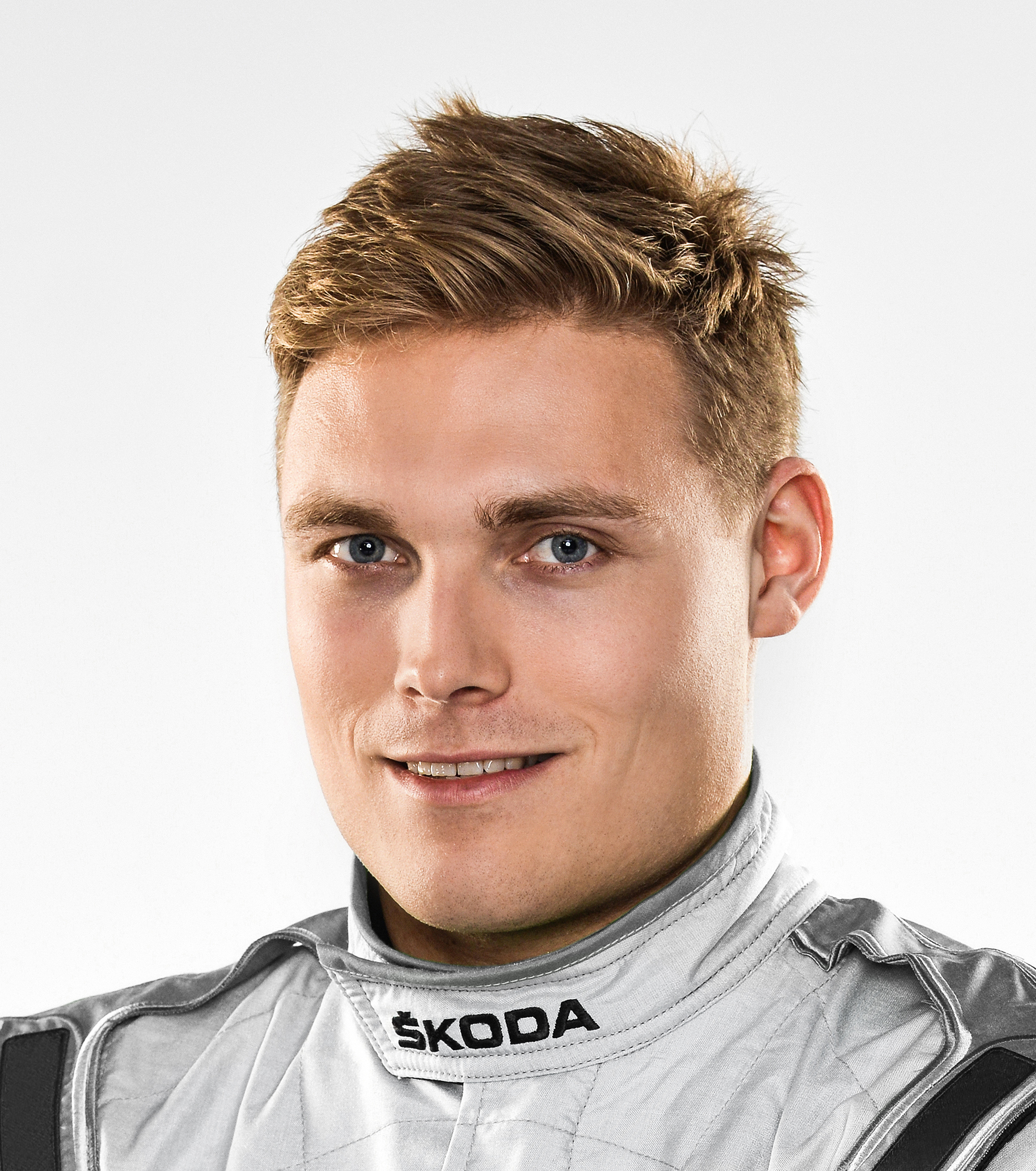
- Tidemand in 2015

Personal information
- Nationality: (Sweden) Swedish
- Full name: Pontus Johan Tidemand
- Born: 10 December 1990 (age 35); Charlottenberg, Värmland, Sweden

World Rally Championship record
- Years active: 2012–2020, 2025
- Teams: Škoda, M-Sport
- Rallies: 56
- Championships: 0
- Rally wins: 0
- Podiums: 0
- Stage wins: 1
- Total points: 60
- First rally: 2012 Rally Sweden
- Last rally: 2025 Rally Sweden

FIA World Rallycross Championship
- Years active: 2014
- Former teams: EKS RX
- Starts: 7
- Wins: 0
- Podiums: 0
- Best finish: 8th in 2014

FIA European Rallycross Championship
- Years active: 2013–2014
- Former teams: EKS RX; Volkswagen Dealer Team KMS
- Starts: 5
- Wins: 0
- Podiums: 1
- Best finish: 3rd in 2014 (Supercar)

Pontus Johan Tidemand (born 10 December 1990) is a Swedish rally and rallycross driver. He is the 2017 WRC-2 champion and a previous M-Sport and Škoda Motorsport driver. Pontus is the son of Swedish rally driver Tomas Tidemand and ex-rally co-driver Maud Solberg, nowadays the wife of Norwegian rally driver Henning Solberg.

== Career ==
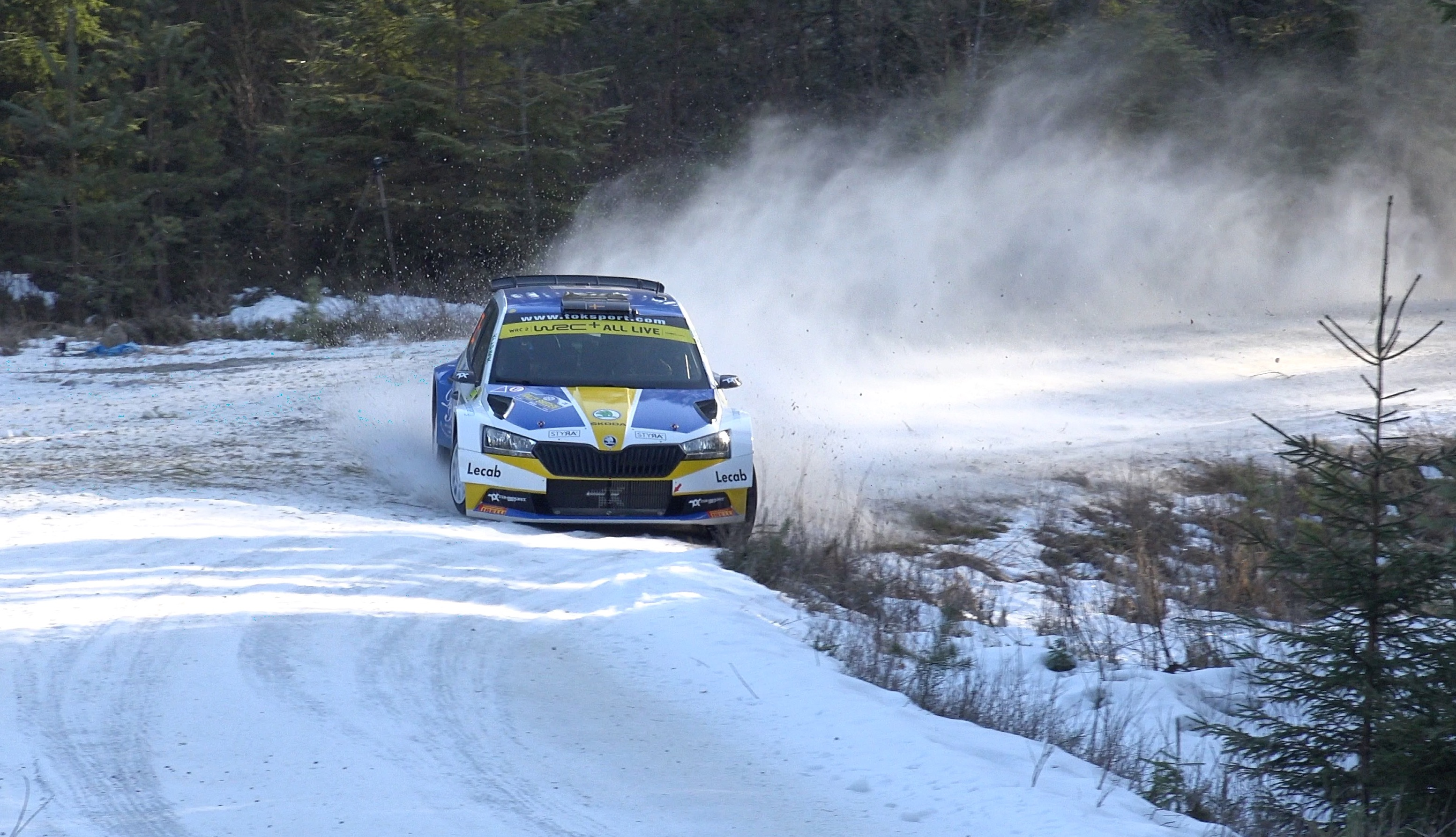
Tidemand at the 2020 Rally Sweden.

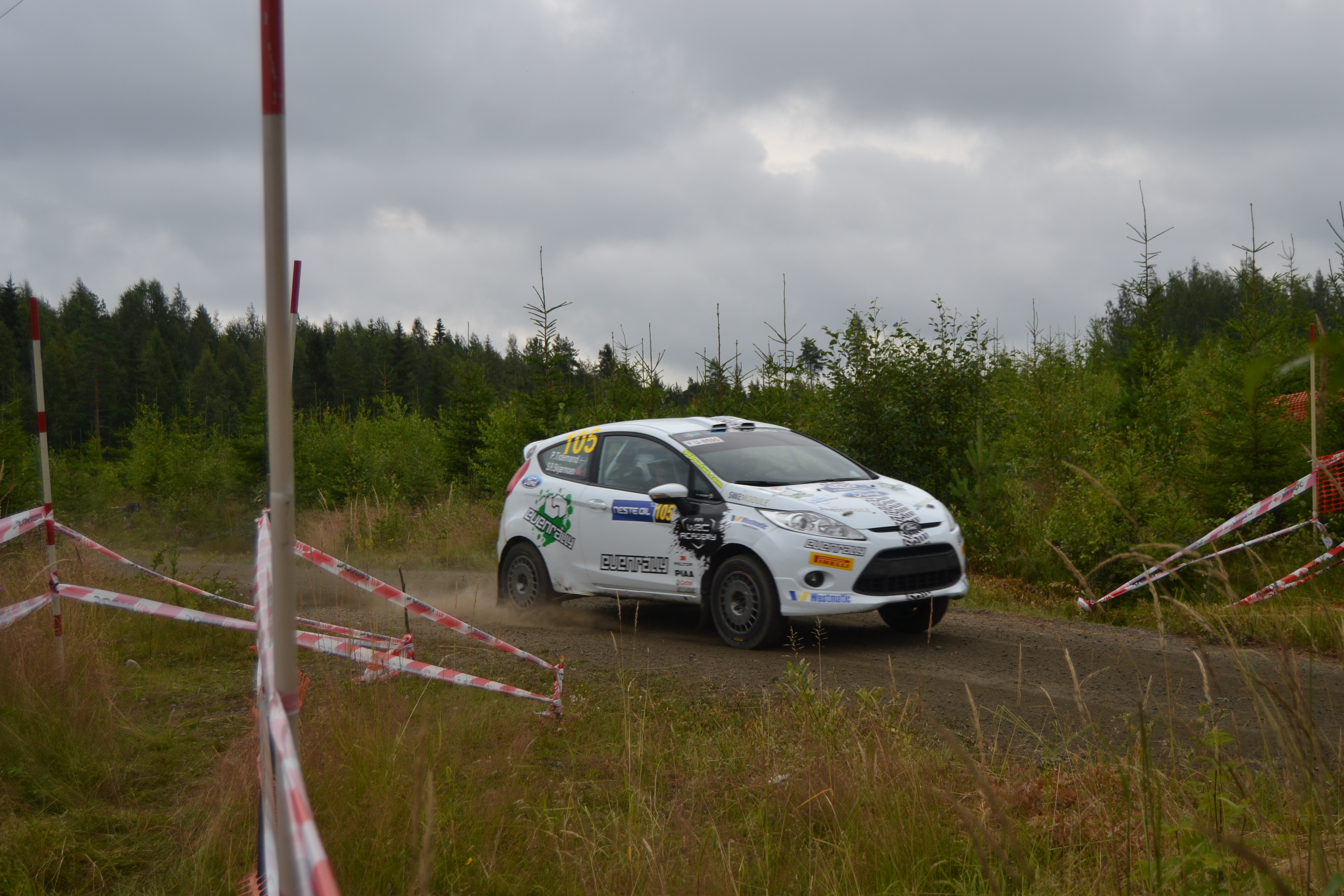
Tidemand at 2012 Rally Finland

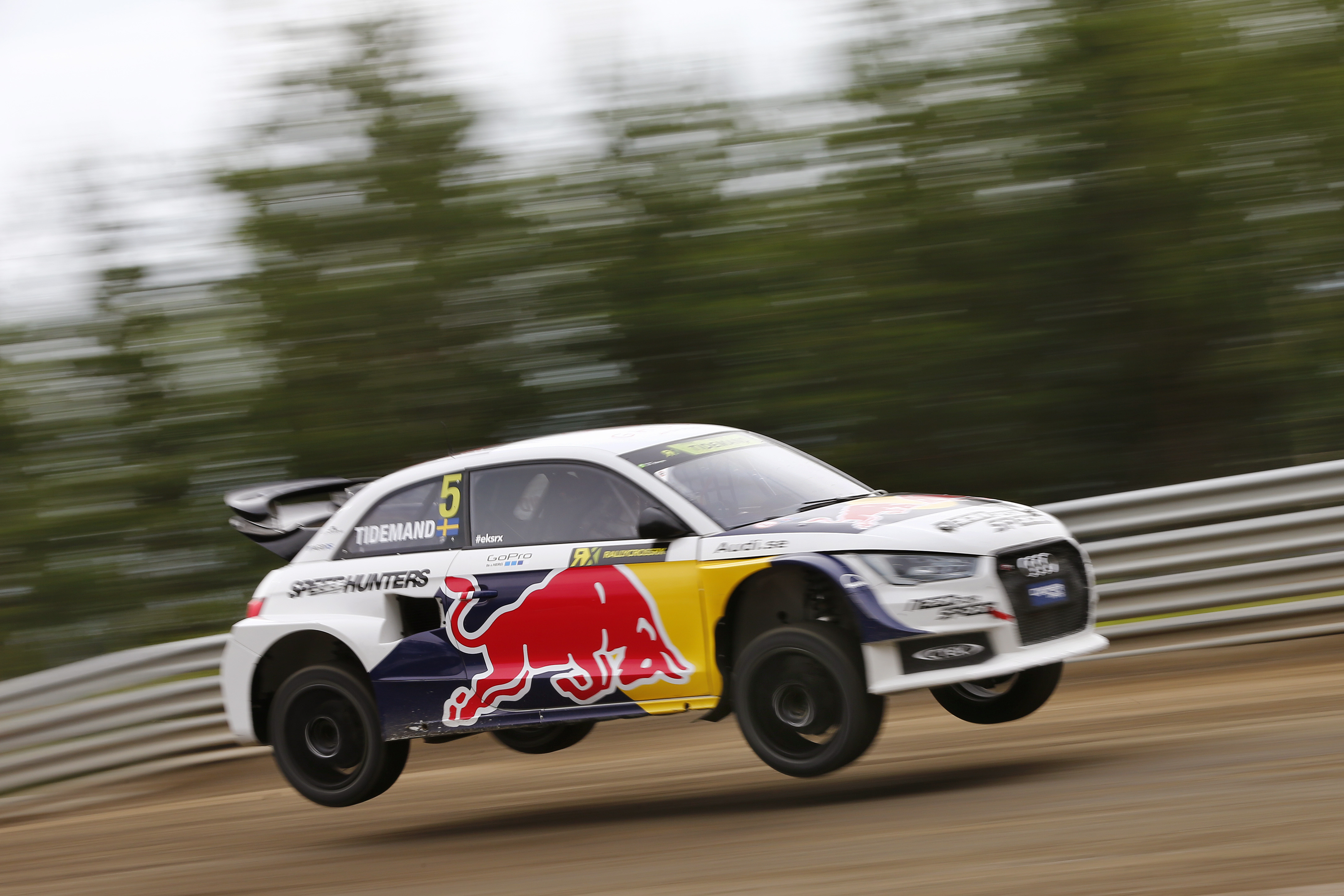
Tidemand at the 2014 World RX of Finland

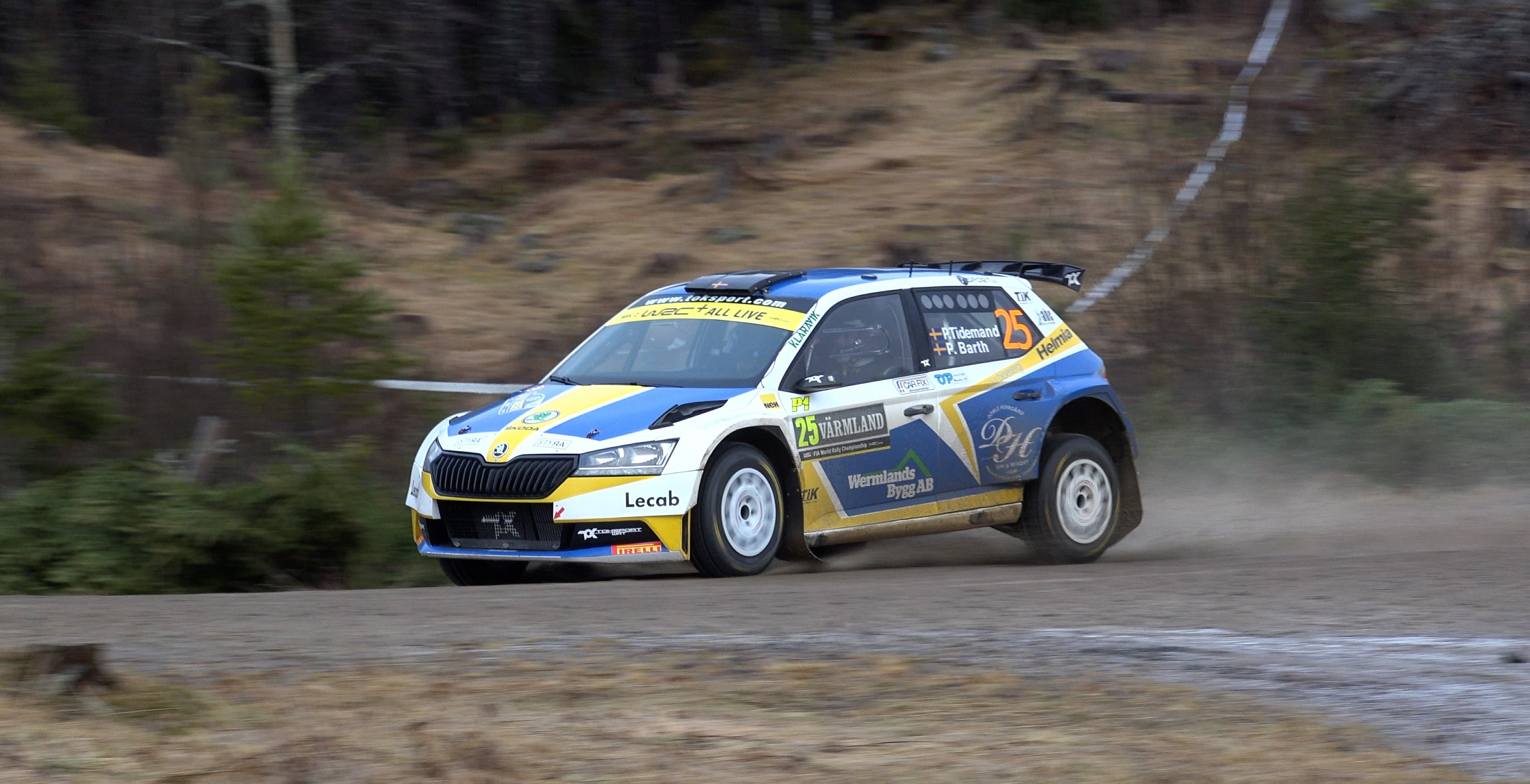
Tidemand at the 2020 Rally Sweden.

Tidemand made his World Rally Championship début in 2012, competing in the WRC Academy. He finished third in the WRC Academy championship behind winner Elfyn Evans and José Antonio Suárez. He also competed that years Rally Sweden in the Super 2000 World Rally Championship, finishing third in the SWRC class. He made his World Rally Car début at the 2013 Rally Sweden in a Ford Fiesta RS WRC.

For 2014, Tidemand switched to rallycross, joining Mattias Ekström's new EKS RX team to drive an Audi S1 in the 2014 FIA World Rallycross Championship.

== Racing record ==
=== WRC results ===
Year	Entrant	Car	1	2	3	4	5	6	7	8	9	10	11	12	13	14	WDC	Points
2012	Pontus Tidemand	Škoda Fabia S2000	MON	SWE; 18	MEX	POR	ARG	GRE	NZL	FIN	GER	GBR	FRA	ITA	ESP		NC	0
2013	Pontus Tidemand	Ford Fiesta RS WRC	MON	SWE; Ret	MEX	POR	ARG	GRE	ITA	FIN	GER	AUS	FRA	ESP	GBR		NC	0
2014	Pontus Tidemand	Ford Fiesta RS WRC	MON	SWE; 8	MEX												19th	6
2014	Pontus Tidemand	Ford Fiesta R5				POR; 11	ARG	ITA	POL	FIN	GER; 9	AUS	FRA; 23	ESP	GBR		19th	6
2015	Pontus Tidemand	Ford Fiesta RRC	MON	SWE; 17	MEX	ARG											24th	4
2015	Škoda Motorsport	Škoda Fabia R5					POR; 13	ITA	POL; 13	FIN; 9	GER	AUS	FRA; Ret	ESP; 9	GBR; WD		24th	4
2016	Škoda Motorsport	Škoda Fabia R5	MON	SWE; 11	MEX	ARG	POR; 9	ITA	POL; 20	FIN; Ret		CHN; C	FRA	ESP; 9		AUS	17th	8
2016	Škoda Motorsport II	Škoda Fabia R5									GER; 8				GBR; 13		17th	8
2017	Škoda Motorsport II	Škoda Fabia R5	MON; 11							POL; 13							18th	4
2017	Škoda Motorsport	Škoda Fabia R5		SWE; 9	MEX; 10	FRA	ARG; 10	POR; 11	ITA		FIN	GER; 12	ESP	GBR; 11	AUS		18th	4
2018	Škoda Motorsport	Škoda Fabia R5	MON	SWE; 12	MEX; 7	FRA	ARG; 10	POR; 8	ITA	FIN	GER			ESP	AUS		16th	12
2018	Škoda Motorsport II	Škoda Fabia R5										TUR; Ret	GBR; 10				16th	12
2019	M-Sport Ford WRT	Ford Fiesta WRC	MON; 20	SWE; 8	MEX	FRA	ARG	CHL	POR	ITA	FIN		TUR; 9	GBR; 7	ESP	AUS; C	13th	12
2019	M-Sport Ford WRT	Ford Fiesta R5 Mk. II										GER; WD					13th	12
2020	Toksport WRT	Škoda Fabia R5 Evo	MON	SWE; 15	MEX; 6	EST; 15	TUR; 8	ITA; 10	MNZ; 10								12th	14
2025	Pontus Tidemand	Škoda Fabia RS Rally2	MON	SWE; 16	KEN	ESP	POR	ITA	GRE	EST	FIN	PAR	CHL	EUR	JPN	SAU	NC	0

==== SWRC results ====
Year	Entrant	Car	1	2	3	4	5	6	7	8	SWRC	Points
2012	Pontus Tidemand	Škoda Fabia S2000	MON	SWE; 3	POR	NZL	FIN	GBR	FRA	ESP	8th	15

==== WRC Academy/JWRC results ====
Year	Entrant	1	2	3	4	5	6	Pos.	Points
2012	Pontus Tidemand	POR; 3 ^{1}	GRE; Ret ^{1}	FIN; 2 ^{6}	GER; 6	FRA; 6 ^{2}	ESP; 2 ^{7}	3rd	84
2013	Pontus Tidemand	POR; 1 ^{5}	GRE; 2 ^{8}	FIN; 3 ^{6}	GER; 1 ^{3}	FRA; 1 ^{1}	ESP; Ret ^{1}	1st	132

==== WRC-2 results ====
Year	Entrant	Car	1	2	3	4	5	6	7	8	9	10	11	12	13	14	WRC-2	Points
2014	Pontus Tidemand	Ford Fiesta R5	MON	SWE	MEX	POR; 3	ARG	ITA	POL	FIN	GER; 1	AUS	FRA; 4	ESP	GBR		7th	52
2015	Pontus Tidemand	Ford Fiesta RRC	MON	SWE; 5	MEX	ARG											4th	86
2015	Škoda Motorsport	Škoda Fabia R5					POR; 3	ITA	POL; 2	FIN; 2	GER	AUS	FRA; Ret	ESP; 1	GBR; WD		4th	86
2016	Škoda Motorsport	Škoda Fabia R5	MON	SWE; 2	MEX	ARG	POR; 1	ITA	POL; 7	FIN; Ret	GER	CHN; C	FRA	ESP; 2		AUS	5th	85
2016	Škoda Motorsport II	Škoda Fabia R5													GBR; 2		5th	85
2017	Škoda Motorsport	Škoda Fabia R5	MON	SWE; 1	MEX; 1	FRA	ARG; 1	POR; 1	ITA		FIN	GER; 3	ESP	GBR; 1	AUS		1st	143
2017	Škoda Motorsport II	Škoda Fabia R5								POL; 2							1st	143
2018	Škoda Motorsport	Škoda Fabia R5	MON	SWE; 2	MEX; 1	FRA	ARG; 1	POR; 1	ITA	FIN	GER			ESP	AUS		2nd	111
2018	Škoda Motorsport II	Škoda Fabia R5										TUR; Ret	GBR; 2				2nd	111
2020	Toksport WRT	Škoda Fabia R5 Evo	MON	SWE; 3	MEX; 1	EST; 3	TUR; 1	ITA; 1	MNZ; 2								2nd	108
2025	Pontus Tidemand	Škoda Fabia RS Rally2	MON	SWE; 8	KEN	ESP	POR	ITA	GRE	EST	FIN	PAR	CHL	EUR	JPN	SAU	45th	4

* Season still in progress.

=== Complete FIA European Rally Championship results ===
Year	Entrant	Car	1	2	3	4	5	6	7	8	ERC	Points
2023	MRF Tyres Dealer Team	Ford Fiesta Rally2	PRT; 13	CAN	POL; 13	LAT	SWE	ITA	CZE	HUN	34th	6

=== Complete FIA European Rallycross Championship results ===
==== Supercar ====
Year	Entrant	Car	1	2	3	4	5	6	7	8	9	ERX	Points
2013	Volkswagen Dealer Team KMS	Volkswagen Scirocco	GBR	POR	FRA	NOR	SWE; 26	BEL	NED	AUT	POL	45th	0
2014	EKS RX	Audi S1	GBR	NOR; 6	BEL; 2	GER; 4	ITA; 6					3rd	50

=== Complete FIA World Rallycross Championship results ===
==== Supercar ====
Year	Entrant	Car	1	2	3	4	5	6	7	8	9	10	11	12	WRX	Points
2014	EKS RX	Audi S1	POR	GBR	NOR; 13	FIN; 13	SWE; 10	BEL; 5	CAN	FRA; 5	GER; 4	ITA; 13	TUR	ARG	8th	84
