= 2018 WRC3 Championship =

The 2018 FIA WRC3 Championship was the sixth season of WRC3, a rallying championship organised and governed by the Fédération Internationale de l'Automobile, running in support of the World Rally Championship. It was created when the Group R class of rally car was introduced in 2013.

Nil Solans and Miquel Ibáñez were the reigning drivers' and co-drivers' champions, while ADAC Sachsen were the defending teams' champions. Enrico Brazzoli and Luca Beltrame won the drivers' and co-drivers' championships. ACI Team Italia won the teams' title.

The 2018 WRC3 season was the final season of the championship for two-wheel drive cars and it was cancelled by the FIA after the 2018 season, however it was revived in 2020 with a new set of regulations for four-wheel drive Group Rally2 cars.

== Calendar ==
The championship was contested over thirteen rounds in Europe, the Middle East, the Americas and Oceania.

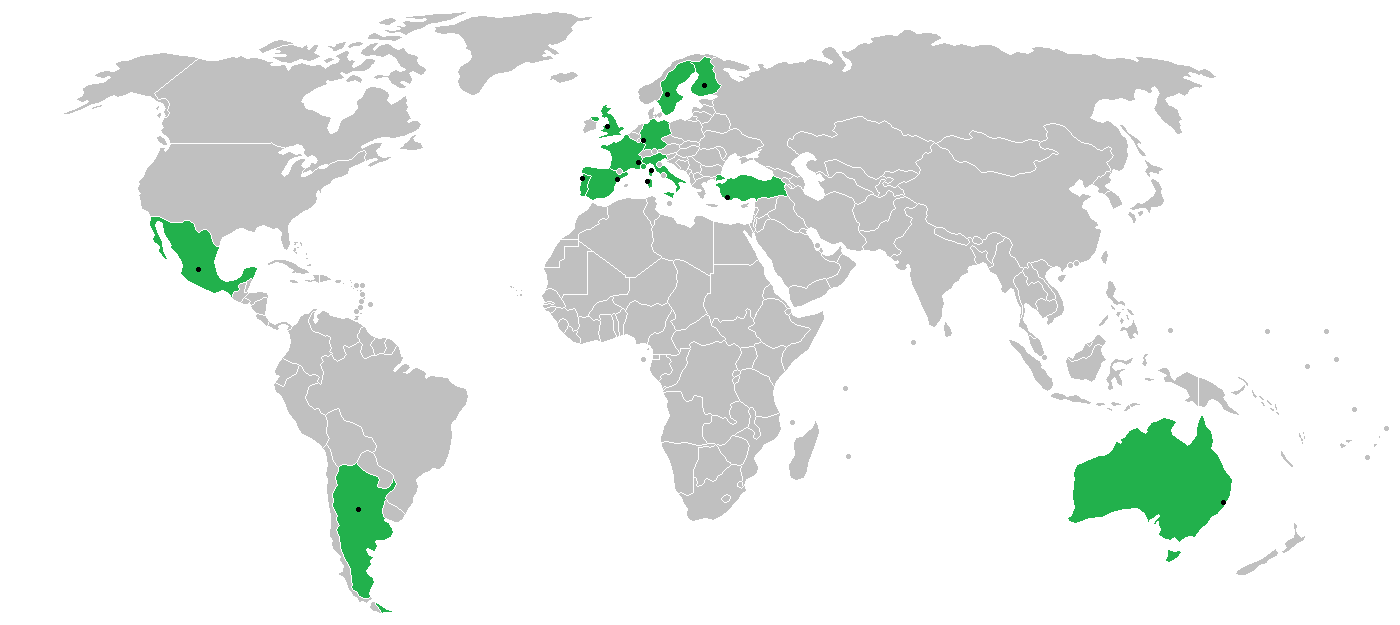
A map showing the locations of the rallies in the 2018 World Rally Championship season.

Round	Dates		Rally	Rally headquarters	Rally details		
Round	Start	Finish	Rally	Rally headquarters	Surface	Stages	Distance
1	25 January	28 January	(Monaco) Rallye Automobile Monte Carlo	Gap, Provence-Alpes-Côte d'Azur (Note: The rally base of the Monte Carlo Rally was located in France.)	Mixed (Note: Rallye Monte Carlo was run on a tarmac and snow surface.)	17	394.74 km
2	15 February	18 February	Rally Sweden	Torsby, Värmland	Snow	19	314.25 km
3	8 March	11 March	(Mexico) Rally Guanajuato México	León, Guanajuato	Gravel	22	344.49 km
4	5 April	8 April	(France) Tour de Corse	Bastia, Haute-Corse	Tarmac	12	333.48 km
5	26 April	29 April	Rally Argentina	Villa Carlos Paz, Córdoba	Gravel	18	358.25 km
6	17 May	20 May	Rally de Portugal	Matosinhos, Porto	Gravel	20	358.19 km
7	7 June	10 June	(Italy) Rally Italia Sardegna	Alghero, Sardinia	Gravel	20	313.46 km
8	26 July	29 July	Rally Finland	Jyväskylä, Keski-Suomi	Gravel	23	317.26 km
9	16 August	19 August	(Germany) ADAC Rallye Deutschland	Bostalsee, Saarland	Tarmac	18	325.76 km
10	13 September	16 September	Marmaris Rally of Turkey	Marmaris, Muğla	Gravel	17	312.44 km
11	4 October	7 October	(United Kingdom) Wales Rally GB	Deeside, Flintshire	Gravel	23	318.34 km
12	25 October	28 October	(Spain) RACC Rally Catalunya de España	Salou, Tarragona	Mixed (Note: Rally Catalunya was run on a tarmac and gravel surface.)	18	331.58 km
13	15 November	18 November	Rally Australia	Coffs Harbour, New South Wales	Gravel	24	318.64 km

=== Calendar changes ===
The Rally of Poland was removed from the calendar after the FIA repeatedly raised concerns about the event's safety. The FIA had previously ordered a review of the event's safety standards ahead of the 2017 event, threatening to rescind the rally's World Championship status if conditions were not improved.

The Rally of Poland was replaced by the Rally of Turkey, which returned to the calendar for the first time since 2010. The event, which was previously based in Istanbul, return to south-western Turkey. It was based in the coastal resort town of Marmaris in Muğla Province, with the route running along the Mediterranean coastline.

The rallies of Great Britain and Catalunya swapped places on the schedule, with Rally Catalunya becoming the penultimate round of the championship. Rallye Deutschland relocated to a new headquarters with the service park located at the Bostalsee reservoir in Saarland state.

=== Route changes ===
Rallye Monte Carlo featured a heavily revised route from the 2017 event, with half the route being brand new. After starting in Mexico City in 2017, Rally Mexico returned to its traditional start in Guanajuato. The route featured minor changes and included a new Power Stage.

The route for the Tour de Corse was heavily revised, with only two of the seven stages being run as they were in 2017. The headquarters of the event was relocated to Bastia, which hosted the event for the first time since 1978.

Organisers of the Wales Rally GB announced plans for a heavily revised route. The changes were made possible by the passage of legislation by the British government allowing public roads to be used for motorsport.

== Entries ==
Manufacturer	Car	Entrant	Tyre	Drivers	Co-drivers	Rounds
Citroën	Citroën DS3 R3T	(Poland) Go+Cars Atlas Ward	M	(Ukraine) Yuriy Protasov	(Ukraine) Pavlo Cherepin	2
Citroën	Citroën DS3 R3T	(United Kingdom) Louise Cook	M	(United Kingdom) Louise Cook	(United Kingdom) Stefan Davis	8, 13
Citroën	Citroën DS3 R3T	(Italy) Enrico Brazzoli	P	(Italy) Enrico Brazzoli	(Italy) Luca Beltrame	13
Ford	Ford Fiesta R2T	(Italy) ACI Team Italia	P	(Italy) Luca Bottarelli	(Italy) Manuel Fenoli	2, 4, 6, 8, 10
Ford	Ford Fiesta R2T	(Italy) ACI Team Italia	P	(Italy) Enrico Oldrati	(Italy) Elia De Guio	10
Ford	Ford Fiesta R2T	(Italy) ACI Team Italia	P	(Italy) Enrico Oldrati	(Italy) Danilo Fappani	6, 8
Ford	Ford Fiesta R2T	(Italy) Enrico Oldrati	P	(Italy) Enrico Oldrati	(Italy) Danilo Fappani	2, 4
Ford	Ford Fiesta R2T	(Germany) ADAC Sachsen	P	(Germany) Julius Tannert	(Austria) Jürgen Heigl	2, 4, 6, 8, 10
Ford	Ford Fiesta R2T	(Republic of Ireland) Callum Devine	P	(Republic of Ireland) Callum Devine	(Republic of Ireland) Keith Moriarty	2, 4
Ford	Ford Fiesta R2T	(Republic of Ireland) Callum Devine	P	(Republic of Ireland) Callum Devine	(Republic of Ireland) Brian Hoy	6, 8, 10
Ford	Ford Fiesta R2T	(New Zealand) David Holder	P	(New Zealand) David Holder	(New Zealand) Jason Farmer	2
Ford	Ford Fiesta R2T	(New Zealand) Holder Brothers Racing	P	(New Zealand) David Holder	(New Zealand) Jason Farmer	4, 6, 8, 10
Ford	Ford Fiesta R2T	(Sweden) Denis Rådström	P	(Sweden) Denis Rådström	(Sweden) Johan Johansson	2, 4, 6, 8, 10
Ford	Ford Fiesta R2T	(Sweden) Emil Bergkvist	P	(Sweden) Emil Bergkvist	(Norway) Ola Fløene	2, 4
Ford	Ford Fiesta R2T	(Sweden) Emil Bergkvist	P	(Sweden) Emil Bergkvist	(Sweden) Joakim Sjöberg	6, 8
Ford	Ford Fiesta R2T	(Sweden) Emil Bergkvist	P	(Sweden) Emil Bergkvist	(Sweden) Patrick Barth	10
Ford	Ford Fiesta R2T	(Chile) Emilio Fernández	P	(Chile) Emilio Fernández	(Chile) Joaquin Riquelme	2, 4, 6, 8, 10
Ford	Ford Fiesta R2T	(France) Jean-Baptiste Franceschi	M	(France) Jean-Baptiste Franceschi	(France) Romain Courbon	1
Ford	Ford Fiesta R2T	(France) Jean-Baptiste Franceschi	P	(France) Jean-Baptiste Franceschi	(France) Romain Courbon	2, 4
Ford	Ford Fiesta R2T	Équipe de France FFSA Rally	P	(France) Jean-Baptiste Franceschi	(France) Romain Courbon	6, 8, 10
Ford	Ford Fiesta R2T	Équipe de France FFSA Rally	M	(France) Jean-Baptiste Franceschi	(France) Romain Courbon	7
Ford	Ford Fiesta R2T	(Estonia) OT Racing	P	(Estonia) Ken Torn	(Estonia) Kuldar Sikk	2, 6, 8, 10
Ford	Ford Fiesta R2T	(Estonia) OT Racing	P	(Estonia) Ken Torn	(Estonia) Ken Järveoja	4
Ford	Ford Fiesta R2T	(France) Terry Folb	P	(France) Terry Folb	(France) Christopher Guieu	2, 4
Ford	Ford Fiesta R2T	(France) Terry Folb	P	(France) Terry Folb	(France) Kevin Bronner	6, 8–9
Ford	Ford Fiesta R2T	(France) Théo Chalal	P	(France) Théo Chalal	(France) Jacques-Julien Renucci	2
Ford	Ford Fiesta R2T	(United Kingdom) Tom Williams	P	(United Kingdom) Tom Williams	(United Kingdom) Phil Hall	2, 4, 6, 8, 10–11
Ford	Ford Fiesta R2T	(Turkey) Catrol Ford Team Türkiye	P	(Turkey) Bugra Banaz	(Turkey) Burak Erdener	4, 6, 8, 10
Ford	Ford Fiesta R2T	(Italy) Umberto Accornero	P	(Italy) Umberto Accornero	(Italy) Barone Maurizio	4, 6, 8
Ford	Ford Fiesta R2T	(Finland) Team Flying Finn	P	(Finland) Henri Hokkala	(Finland) Kimmo Pahkala	8
Ford	Ford Fiesta R2T	(United Kingdom) Louise Cook	M	(United Kingdom) Louise Cook	(United Kingdom) Stefan Davis	9–12
Ford	Ford Fiesta R2T	(Romania) Raul Badiu	P	(Romania) Raul Badiu	(Romania) Gabriel Lazar	10
Ford	Ford Fiesta R2	(United Kingdom) MH Motorsport	P	(United Kingdom) Tom Williams	(United Kingdom) Phil Hall	3
Ford	Ford Fiesta R2	(United Kingdom) Darren Garrod	P	(India) Sanjay Takale	(United Kingdom) Darren Garrod	8
Peugeot	Peugeot 208 R2	(Belgium) Amaury Molle	M	(Belgium) Amaury Molle	(Belgium) Renaud Herman	1, 4, 12
Peugeot	Peugeot 208 R2	(Italy) Enrico Brazzoli	D	(Italy) Enrico Brazzoli	(Italy) Luca Beltrame	1, 7
Peugeot	Peugeot 208 R2	(Italy) Enrico Brazzoli	P	(Italy) Enrico Brazzoli	(Italy) Luca Beltrame	9, 11–12
Peugeot	Peugeot 208 R2	(Finland) Taisko Lario	M	(Finland) Taisko Lario	(Finland) Tatu Hämäläinen	1
Peugeot	Peugeot 208 R2	(Finland) Taisko Lario	P	(Finland) Taisko Lario	(Finland) Tatu Hämäläinen	2, 7–9, 11–12
Peugeot	Peugeot 208 R2	(United Kingdom) Louise Cook	M	(United Kingdom) Louise Cook	(United Kingdom) Stefan Davis	7

== Results and standings ==
=== Season summary ===
Round	Event	Winning driver	Winning co-driver	Winning entrant	Winning time	Report
1	(Monaco) Rallye Monte Carlo	(Italy) Enrico Brazzoli	(Italy) Luca Beltrame	(Italy) Enrico Brazzoli	5:22:03.0	Report
2	Rally Sweden	(Sweden) Denis Rådström	(Sweden) Johan Johansson	(Sweden) Denis Rådström	3:16:26.0	Report
3	(Mexico) Rally México	No WRC3 finishers				Report
4	(France) Tour de Corse	(France) Jean-Baptiste Franceschi	(France) Romain Courbon	(France) Jean-Baptiste Franceschi	3:56:28.7	Report
5	Rally Argentina	No WRC3 entries				Report
6	Rally Portugal	(Sweden) Denis Rådström	(Sweden) Johan Johansson	(Sweden) Denis Rådström	4:26:51.2	Report
7	(Italy) Rally Italia Sardegna	(France) Jean-Baptiste Franceschi	(France) Romain Courbon	Équipe de France FFSA Rally	4:14:07.7	Report
8	Rally Finland	(Estonia) Ken Torn	(Estonia) Kuldar Sikk	(Estonia) OT Racing	3:03:07.2	Report
9	(Germany) Rallye Deutschland	(Finland) Taisko Lario	(Finland) Tatu Hämäläinen	(Finland) Taisko Lario	3:49:47.9	Report
10	Rally Turkey	(Sweden) Emil Bergkvist	(Sweden) Patrick Barth	(Sweden) Emil Bergkvist	4:40:03.2	Report
11	(United Kingdom) Wales Rally GB	(United Kingdom) Tom Williams	(United Kingdom) Phil Hall	(United Kingdom) Tom Williams	3:49:44.9	Report
12	(Spain) Rally Catalunya	(Italy) Enrico Brazzoli	(Italy) Luca Beltrame	(Italy) Enrico Brazzoli	3:58:18.3	Report
13	Rally Australia	No WRC3 finishers				Report

=== Scoring system ===
Points were awarded to the top ten classified finishers in each event. Six best results counted towards championship.

Position	1st	2nd	3rd	4th	5th	6th	7th	8th	9th	10th
Points	25	18	15	12	10	8	6	4	2	1

=== FIA WRC3 Championship for Drivers ===
Pos.	Driver	MON (Monaco)	SWE (Sweden)	MEX (Mexico)	FRA (France)	ARG (Argentina)	POR (Portugal)	ITA (Italy)	FIN (Finland)	DEU (Germany)	TUR (Turkey)	GBR (United Kingdom)	CAT (Spain)	AUS (Australia)	Drops	Points
1	(Italy) Enrico Brazzoli	1						4		2		2	1	Ret	0	98
2	(Finland) Taisko Lario	3	8					2	7	1		3	2		4	97
3	(Sweden) Emil Bergkvist		2		3		5		2		1				0	86
4	(Sweden) Denis Rådström		1		4		1		Ret		2				0	80
5	(France) Jean-Baptiste Franceschi	Ret	4		1		9	1	3		Ret				0	79
6	(United Kingdom) Louise Cook							3	DNS	3	9	4	3	WD	0	59
7	(United Kingdom) Tom Williams		12	Ret	11		7		6		6	1			0	47
8	(Republic of Ireland) Callum Devine		7		5		Ret		5		4				0	38
9	(Estonia) Ken Torn		14		6		Ret		1		Ret				0	33
10	(Germany) Julius Tannert		3		9		10		4		Ret				0	30
11	(Turkey) Bugra Banaz				8		4		8		5				0	30
12	(France) Terry Folb		5		2		Ret		13	WD					0	28
13	(Italy) Enrico Oldrati		Ret		12		2		9		8				0	24
14	(New Zealand) David Holder		11		15		3		10		7				0	22
15	(Belgium) Amaury Molle	2			14								WD		0	18
16	(Chile) Emilio Fernández		9		10		11		15		3				0	18
17	(Italy) Luca Bottarelli		10		7		6		12		WD				0	15
18	(Ukraine) Yuriy Protasov		6												0	8
19	(Italy) Umberto Accornero				13		8		11						0	4
Pos.	Driver	MON (Monaco)	SWE (Sweden)	MEX (Mexico)	FRA (France)	ARG (Argentina)	POR (Portugal)	ITA (Italy)	FIN (Finland)	DEU (Germany)	TUR (Turkey)	GBR (United Kingdom)	CAT (Spain)	AUS (Australia)	Drops	Points

Key
Colour	Result
Gold	Winner
Silver	2nd place
Bronze	3rd place
Green	Points finish
Blue	Non-points finish
Blue	Non-classified finish (NC)
Purple	Did not finish (Ret)
Black	Excluded (EX)
Black	Disqualified (DSQ)
White	Did not start (DNS)
White	Cancelled (C)
Blank	Withdrew entry from the event (WD)

=== FIA WRC3 Championship for Co-Drivers ===
Pos.	Driver	MON (Monaco)	SWE (Sweden)	MEX (Mexico)	FRA (France)	ARG (Argentina)	POR (Portugal)	ITA (Italy)	FIN (Finland)	DEU (Germany)	TUR (Turkey)	GBR (United Kingdom)	CAT (Spain)	AUS (Australia)	Drops	Points
1	(Italy) Luca Beltrame	1						4		2		2	1	Ret	0	98
2	(Finland) Tatu Hämäläinen	3	8					2	7	1		3	2		4	97
3	(Sweden) Johan Johansson		1		4		1		Ret		2				0	80
4	(France) Romain Courbon	Ret	4		1		9	1	3		Ret				0	79
5	(United Kingdom) Stefan Davis							3	DNS	3	9	4	3	WD	0	59
6	(United Kingdom) Phil Hall		12	Ret	11		7		6		6	1			0	47
7	(Norway) Ola Fløene		2		3										0	33
8	(Austria) Jürgen Heigl		3		9		10		4		Ret				0	30
9	(Turkey) Burak Erdener				8		4		8		5				0	30
10	(France) Christopher Guieu		5		2										0	28
11	(Sweden) Joakim Sjöberg						5		2						0	28
12	(Estonia) Kuldar Sikk		14				Ret		1		Ret				0	25
13	(Sweden) Patrick Barth										1				0	25
14	(New Zealand) Jason Farmer		11		15		3		10		7				0	22
15	(Republic of Ireland) Brian Hoy						Ret		5		4				0	22
16	(Italy) Danilo Fappani		Ret		12		2		9						0	20
17	(Belgium) Renaud Herman	2			14								WD		0	18
18	(Chile) Joaquin Riquelme		9		10		11		15		3				0	18
19	(Republic of Ireland) Keith Moriarty		7		5										0	16
20	(Italy) Manuel Fenoli		10		7		6		12		WD				0	15
21	(Ukraine) Pavlo Cherepin		6												0	8
22	(Estonia) Ken Järveoja				6										0	8
23	(Italy) Maurizio Barone				13		8		11						0	4
24	(Italy) Elia De Guio										8				0	4
Pos.	Driver	MON (Monaco)	SWE (Sweden)	MEX (Mexico)	FRA (France)	ARG (Argentina)	POR (Portugal)	ITA (Italy)	FIN (Finland)	DEU (Germany)	TUR (Turkey)	GBR (United Kingdom)	CAT (Spain)	AUS (Australia)	Drops	Points

Key
Colour	Result
Gold	Winner
Silver	2nd place
Bronze	3rd place
Green	Points finish
Blue	Non-points finish
Blue	Non-classified finish (NC)
Purple	Did not finish (Ret)
Black	Excluded (EX)
Black	Disqualified (DSQ)
White	Did not start (DNS)
White	Cancelled (C)
Blank	Withdrew entry from the event (WD)

=== FIA WRC3 Championship for Teams ===
Pos.	Team	MON (Monaco)	SWE (Sweden)	MEX (Mexico)	FRA (France)	ARG (Argentina)	POR (Portugal)	ITA (Italy)	FIN (Finland)	DEU (Germany)	TUR (Turkey)	GBR (United Kingdom)	CAT (Spain)	AUS (Australia)	Points
1	(Italy) ACI Team Italia		3		2		1		5		3				83
2	(Turkey) Castrol Ford Team Turkiye				3		3		4		1				67
3	(Estonia) OT Racing		4		1		Ret		1		Ret				62
4	(Germany) ADAC Sachsen		1		4		5		3		Ret				62
5	Équipe de France FFSA Rally						4	1	2		Ret				55
6	(New Zealand) Holder Brothers Racing				5		2		6		2				54
7	(Poland) Go+Cars Atlas Ward		2												18
Pos.	Driver	MON (Monaco)	SWE (Sweden)	MEX (Mexico)	FRA (France)	ARG (Argentina)	POR (Portugal)	ITA (Italy)	FIN (Finland)	DEU (Germany)	TUR (Turkey)	GBR (United Kingdom)	CAT (Spain)	AUS (Australia)	Points

Key
Colour	Result
Gold	Winner
Silver	2nd place
Bronze	3rd place
Green	Points finish
Blue	Non-points finish
Blue	Non-classified finish (NC)
Purple	Did not finish (Ret)
Black	Excluded (EX)
Black	Disqualified (DSQ)
White	Did not start (DNS)
White	Cancelled (C)
Blank	Withdrew entry from the event (WD)
