= 2018 Rally Sweden =

Car race

2018 Rally Sweden: 66. Rally Sweden
Round 2 of 13 in the 2018 World Rally Championship
← Previous event	Next event →
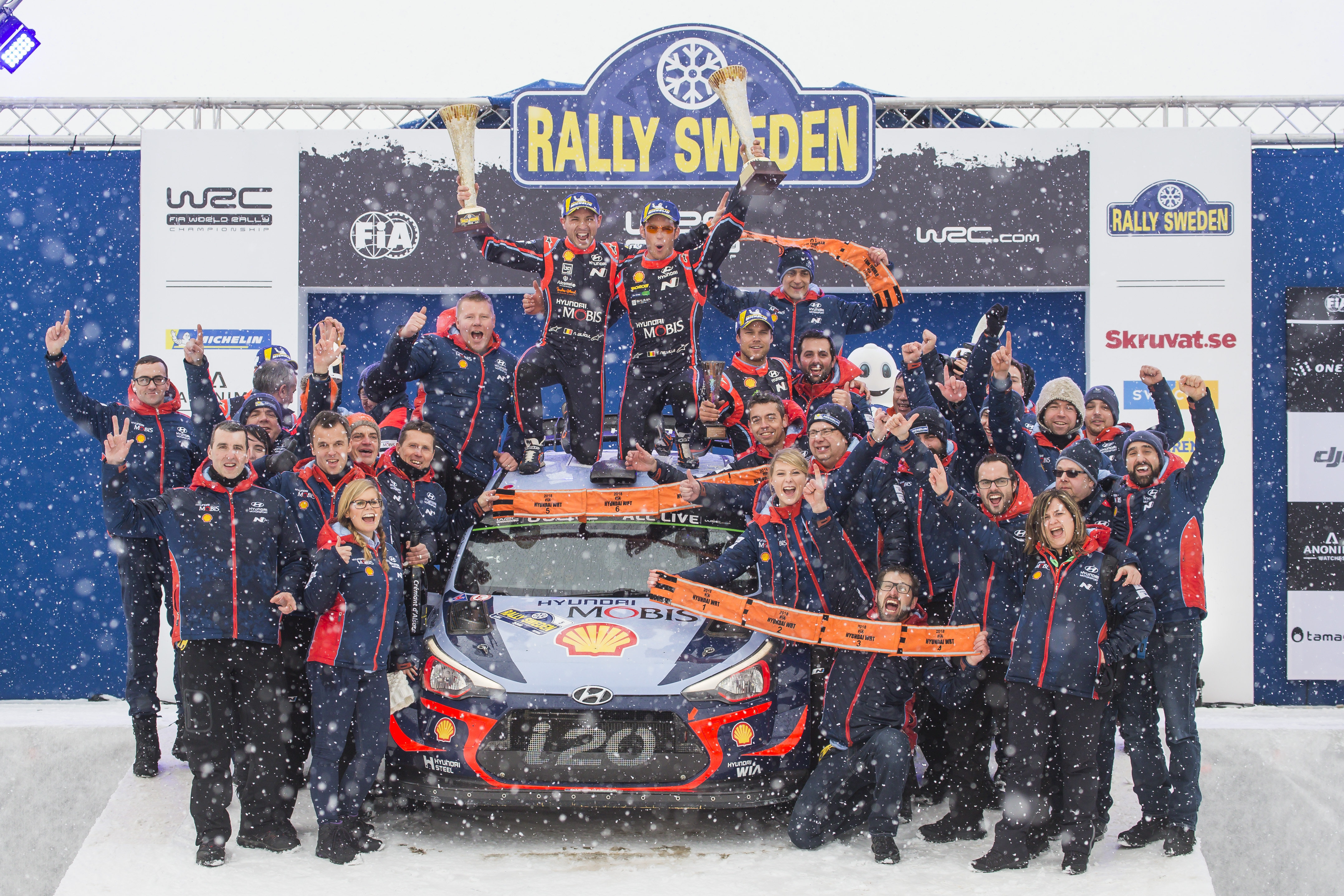
- Thierry Neuville and Nicolas Gilsoul on the podium with Hyundai.
- Host country: Sweden / Norway
- Rally base: (Sweden) Torsby, Värmland
- Dates run: 15 – 18 February 2018
- Start location: Karlstad trotting track, Karlstad
- Finish location: Torsby, Värmland
- Stages: 19 (314.25 km; 195.27 miles)
- Stage surface: Gravel and snow
- Transport distance: 1,086.28 km (674.98 miles)
- Overall distance: 1,400.79 km (870.41 miles)

Statistics
- Crews registered: 68
- Crews: 66 at start, 59 at finish

Overall results
- Overall winner: (Belgium) Thierry Neuville (Belgium) Nicolas Gilsoul (South Korea) Hyundai Shell Mobis WRT; 2:52:13.1
- Power Stage winner: (Finland) Esapekka Lappi (Finland) Janne Ferm (Japan) Toyota Gazoo Racing WRT

Support category results
- WRC-2 winner: (Japan) Takamoto Katsuta (Finland) Marko Salminen (Finland) Tommi Mäkinen Racing; 3:01:27.5
- WRC-3 winner: (Sweden) Denis Rådström (Sweden) Johan Johansson (Sweden) Denis Rådström; 3:16:26.0

The 2018 Rally Sweden (formally known as the Rally Sweden 2018) was a motor racing event for rally cars that was held over four days between 15 and 18 February 2018. It marked the sixty-sixth running of Rally Sweden, and was the second round of the 2018 World Rally Championship and its support categories, the WRC-2 and WRC-3 championships. It was also the first round of the Junior World Rally Championship. The event, which was based in the town of Torsby in Värmland County, was contested over nineteen special stages totalling a competitive distance of 314.25 km (195.27 mi).

Jari-Matti Latvala and Miikka Anttila were the defending rally winners. Thierry Neuville and Nicolas Gilsoul were the rally winners. Their team, Hyundai Shell Mobis WRT, were the manufacturers' winners. The Belgian also became only the third non-Nordic driver to win the event after the nine-time world champion, Sébastien Loeb, and the defending world champion, Sébastien Ogier. The Tommi Mäkinen Racing crew of Takamoto Katsuta and Marko Salminen won the World Rally Championship-2 category in a Ford Fiesta R5, while Swedish crew Denis Rådström and Johan Johansson won the World Rally Championship-3 and Junior World Rally Championship.

== Background ==
=== Championship standings prior to the event ===
Sébastien Ogier and Julien Ingrassia entered the round with an eight-point lead in the World Championships for Drivers and Co-drivers. In the World Championship for Manufacturers, M-Sport Ford WRT and Toyota Gazoo Racing WRT held a fifteen-point lead over Citroën Total Abu Dhabi WRT.

=== Entry list ===
The following crews were entered into the rally. The event was open to crews competing in the World Rally Championship, World Rally Championship-2, World Rally Championship-3 and Junior World Rally Championships. The final entry list consisted of fourteen World Rally Car entries, fifteen in the World Rally Championship-2, and fifteen entries in the World Rally Championship-3, twelve of which were eligible to score points in the Junior World Rally Championship.

No.	Entrant	Driver	Co-Driver	Car	Tyre
World Rally Car entries
1	(United Kingdom) M-Sport Ford WRT	(France) Sébastien Ogier	(France) Julien Ingrassia	Ford Fiesta WRC	M
2	(United Kingdom) M-Sport Ford WRT	(United Kingdom) Elfyn Evans	(United Kingdom) Daniel Barritt	Ford Fiesta WRC	M
3	(United Kingdom) M-Sport Ford WRT	(Finland) Teemu Suninen	(Finland) Mikko Markkula	Ford Fiesta WRC	M
4	(South Korea) Hyundai Shell Mobis WRT	(Norway) Andreas Mikkelsen	(Norway) Anders Jæger-Synnevaag	Hyundai i20 Coupe WRC	M
5	(South Korea) Hyundai Shell Mobis WRT	(Belgium) Thierry Neuville	(Belgium) Nicolas Gilsoul	Hyundai i20 Coupe WRC	M
6	(South Korea) Hyundai Shell Mobis WRT	(New Zealand) Hayden Paddon	(United Kingdom) Sebastian Marshall	Hyundai i20 Coupe WRC	M
7	(Japan) Toyota Gazoo Racing WRT	(Finland) Jari-Matti Latvala	(Finland) Miikka Anttila	Toyota Yaris WRC	M
8	(Japan) Toyota Gazoo Racing WRT	(Estonia) Ott Tänak	(Estonia) Martin Järveoja	Toyota Yaris WRC	M
9	(Japan) Toyota Gazoo Racing WRT	(Finland) Esapekka Lappi	(Finland) Janne Ferm	Toyota Yaris WRC	M
10	(France) Citroën Total Abu Dhabi WRT	(United Kingdom) Kris Meeke	(Republic of Ireland) Paul Nagle	Citroën C3 WRC	M
11	(France) Citroën Total Abu Dhabi WRT	(Republic of Ireland) Craig Breen	(United Kingdom) Scott Martin	Citroën C3 WRC	M
12	(France) Citroën Total Abu Dhabi WRT	(Norway) Mads Østberg	(Norway) Torstein Eriksen	Citroën C3 WRC	M
14	(Norway) Henning Solberg	(Norway) Henning Solberg	(Norway) Cato Menkerud	Ford Fiesta WRC	M
21	(Saudi Arabia) Yazeed Racing	(Saudi Arabia) Yazeed Al Rajhi	(United Kingdom) Michael Orr	Ford Fiesta RS WRC	M
World Rally Championship-2 entries
31	(Czech Republic) Škoda Motorsport	(Sweden) Pontus Tidemand	(Sweden) Jonas Andersson	Škoda Fabia R5	M
32	(Czech Republic) Škoda Motorsport	(Norway) Ole Christian Veiby	(Norway) Stig Rune Skjærmoen	Škoda Fabia R5	M
33	(Finland) Printsport	(Poland) Łukasz Pieniążek	(Poland) Przemysław Mazur	Škoda Fabia R5	M
34	(South Korea) Hyundai Motorsport	(Finland) Jari Huttunen	(Finland) Antti Linnaketo	Hyundai i20 R5	M
35	(Finland) Tommi Mäkinen Racing	(Japan) Hiroki Arai	(Australia) Glenn MacNeall	Ford Fiesta R5	P
36	(Finland) Tommi Mäkinen Racing	(Japan) Takamoto Katsuta	(Finland) Marko Salminen	Ford Fiesta R5	P
38	(Italy) S.A. Motorsport Italia Srl	(Italy) Umberto Scandola	(Italy) Andrea Gaspari	Škoda Fabia R5	D
39	(Russia) TAIF Motorsport	(Russia) Radik Shaymiev	(Russia) Maxim Tsvetkov	Ford Fiesta R5	P
40	(Netherlands) Kevin Abbring	(Netherlands) Kevin Abbring	(Belgium) Pieter Tsjoen	Ford Fiesta R5	P
41	(Sweden) Fredrik Åhlin	(Sweden) Fredrik Åhlin	(Sweden) Joakim Sjöberg	Škoda Fabia R5	D
42	(Sweden) Mattias Adielsson	(Sweden) Mattias Adielsson	(Sweden) Andreas Johansson	Škoda Fabia R5	P
43	(Turkey) Toksport World Rally Team	(Finland) Janne Tuohino	(Finland) Reeta Hämäläinen	Škoda Fabia R5	P
44	(Sweden) Lars Stugemo	(Sweden) Lars Stugemo	(Sweden) Kalle Lexe	Škoda Fabia R5	P
45	(Turkey) Toksport World Rally Team	(Finland) Jarmo Berg	(Finland) Rami Suorsa	Škoda Fabia R5	P
46	(Italy) Gianluca Linari	(Italy) Gianluca Linari	(Italy) Nicola Arena	Ford Fiesta R5	P
World Rally Championship-3 entries
61	(Sweden) Emil Bergkvist	(Sweden) Emil Bergkvist^{‡}	(Norway) Ola Fløene	Ford Fiesta R2T	P
62	(France) Terry Folb	(France) Terry Folb^{‡}	(France) Christopher Guieu	Ford Fiesta R2T	P
63	(Sweden) Denis Rådström	(Sweden) Denis Rådström^{‡}	(Sweden) Johan Johansson	Ford Fiesta R2T	P
65	(Estonia) OT Racing	(Estonia) Ken Torn^{‡}	(Estonia) Kuldar Sikk	Ford Fiesta R2T	P
66	(Germany) ADAC Sachsen	(Germany) Julius Tannert^{‡}	(Austria) Jürgen Heigl	Ford Fiesta R2T	P
67	(Republic of Ireland) Callum Devine	(Republic of Ireland) Callum Devine^{‡}	(Republic of Ireland) Keith Moriarty	Ford Fiesta R2T	P
68	(New Zealand) David Holder	(New Zealand) David Holder^{‡}	(New Zealand) Jason Farmer	Ford Fiesta R2T	P
69	(France) Jean-Baptiste Franceschi	(France) Jean-Baptiste Franceschi^{‡}	(France) Romain Courbon	Ford Fiesta R2T	P
70	(Italy) ACI Team Italia	(Italy) Luca Bottarelli^{‡}	(Italy) Manuel Fenoli	Ford Fiesta R2T	P
71	(France) Théo Chalal	(France) Théo Chalal^{‡}	(France) Jacques-Julien Renucci	Ford Fiesta R2T	P
72	(United Kingdom) Tom Williams	(United Kingdom) Tom Williams^{‡}	(United Kingdom) Phil Hall	Ford Fiesta R2T	P
73	(Chile) Emilio Fernández	(Chile) Emilio Fernández^{‡}	(Chile) Joaquin Riquelme	Ford Fiesta R2T	P
74	(Italy) Enrico Oldrati	(Italy) Enrico Oldrati^{‡}	(Italy) Danilo Fappani	Ford Fiesta R2T	P
75	(Poland) Go+Cars Atlas Ward	(Ukraine) Yuriy Protasov	(Ukraine) Pavlo Cherepin	Citroën DS3 R3T	M
76	(Finland) Taisko Lario	(Finland) Taisko Lario	(Finland) Tatu Hämäläinen	Peugeot 208 R2	M
Other major entries
81	(Finland) Tommi Mäkinen Racing	(Finland) Jarkko Nikara	(Japan) Sayaka Adachi	Ford Fiesta R5	P
83	(Spain) Nil Solans	(Spain) Nil Solans	(Spain) Miquel Ibáñez Sotos	Ford Fiesta R5	D
102	(Sweden) Kristoffersson Motorsport	(Sweden) Johan Kristoffersson	(Sweden) Patrik Barth	Škoda Fabia R5	P

Notes

- ^‡ — Driver is eligible to score points in the FIA Junior World Rally Championship.

=== Route ===
==== Itenerary ====
Date	Time	No.	Stage name	Distance
15 February	08:00	—	Skalla [Shakedown]	6.86 km
Leg 1 — 142.00 km
15 February	20:08	SS1	SSS Karlstad 1	1.90 km
16 February	06:00		Service A – Torsby	—
16 February	07:55	SS2	Hof-Finnskog 1	21.26 km
16 February	09:07	SS3	Svullrya 1	24.88 km
16 February	09:54	SS4	Röjden 1	19.13 km
16 February	11:31		Service B – Torsby	—
16 February	13:41	SS5	Hof-Finnskog 2	21.26 km
16 February	15:03	SS6	Svullrya 2	24.88 km
16 February	15:50	SS7	Röjden 2	19.13 km
16 February	16:56	SS8	Torsby 1	9.56 km
16 February	17:31		Flexi Service C – Torsby	—
Leg 2 — 120.31 km
17 February	07:05		Service D – Torsby	—
17 February	07:54	SS9	Torntorp 1	19.88 km
17 February	09:12	SS10	Hagfors 1	23.40 km
17 February	10:09	SS11	Vargåsen 1	14.21 km
17 February	11:40		Service E – Torsby	—
17 February	12:41	SS12	Torntorp 2	19.88 km
17 February	14:12	SS13	Hagfors 2	23.40 km
17 February	15:08	SS14	Vargåsen 2	14.21 km
17 February	17:41	SS15	SSS Karlstad 2	1.90 km
17 February	19:26	SS16	Torsby Sprint	3.43 km
17 February	19:56		Flexi Service F – Torsby	—
Leg 3 — 51.94 km
18 February	06:30		Service G – Torsby	—
18 February	07:50	SS17	Likenäs 1	21.19 km
18 February	09:51	SS18	Likenäs 2	21.19 km
18 February	12:18	SS19	Torsby 2 [Power Stage]	9.56 km

== Report ==
=== Thursday ===
Ott Tänak drove a Yaris, defeated Thierry Neuville in their head-to-head heat on snow roads and stopped the clocks 0.3 second faster than Latvala, who beat Mads Østberg in their battle by 0.3 second. The Norwegian was impressive on his Citroën C3 debut to hold third as competitors headed north to Torsby for an overnight halt. Kris Meeke, driving another C3, and Hyundai i20 pilot Andreas Mikkelsen were tied in fourth, a further 0.3 second behind, while Neuville completed the top six. Toyota's Esapekka Lappi and championship leader Sébastien Ogier lost time after running wide on the same corner near the finish. They were eighth and ninth respectively but just 2.9 seconds off the pace.

=== Friday ===
The early starters lost time ploughing a clean route through fresh snow. Championship leader Sébastien Ogier was the first on the road. He was struggle with the grip all day and conceded almost three minutes en route to twelfth. So were Ott Tänak and Jari-Matti Latvala. The Toyota teammates separated by eighth and ninth. Craig Breen was third on the board, and the Irishman was delighted with his form with two afternoon stages wins. Teammate Mads Østberg was 0.5 second further back. Lying sixth after last night's curtain-raising speed test, Thierry Neuville moved his i20 to the front on this morning's second stage and held off a chasing pack which had the advantage of better conditions. Norwegian Andreas Mikkelsen, who started further behind, had a trouble-free day while Hayden Paddon running out of the top three to make Hyundai 1-2-3.

=== Saturday ===
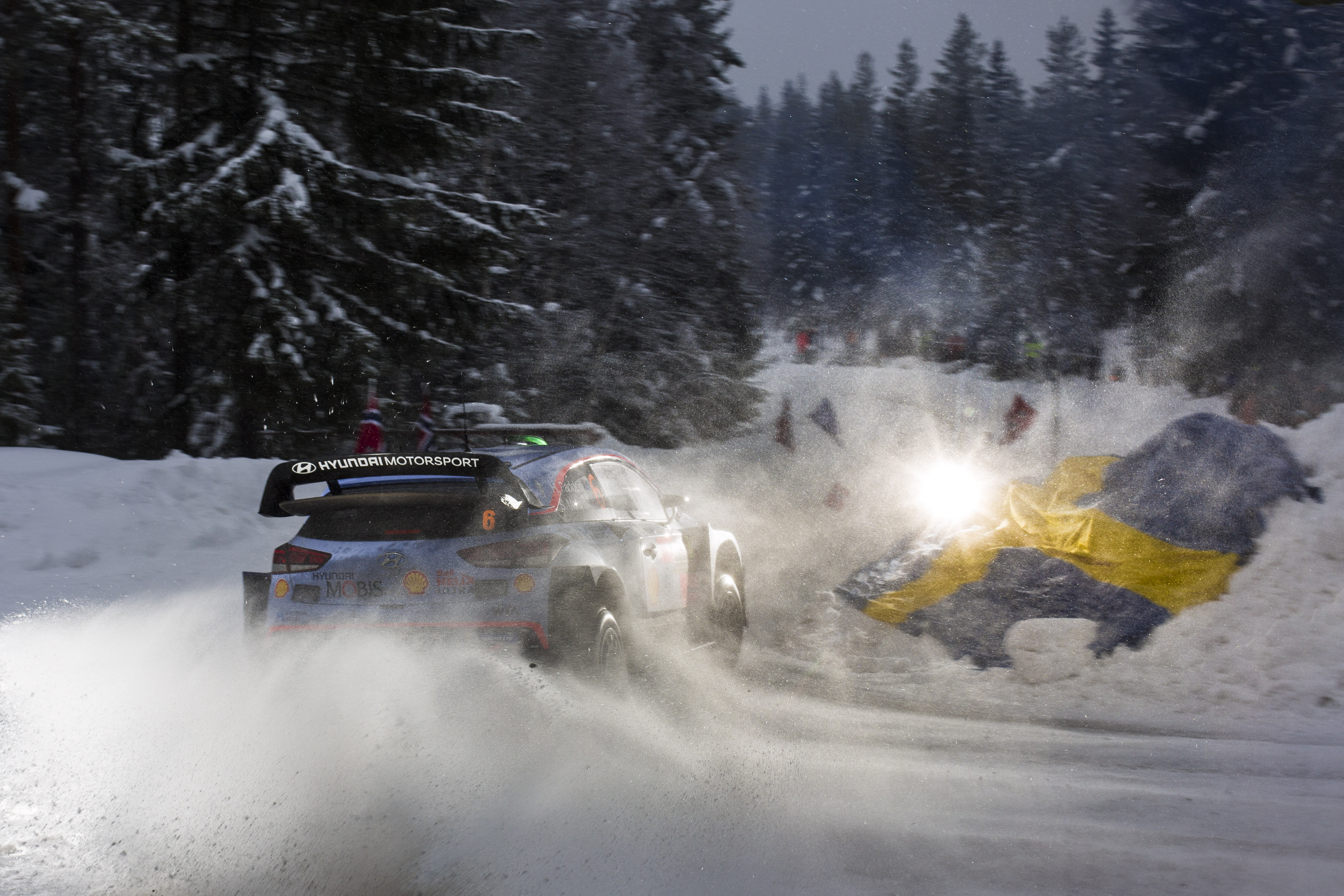
Hayden Paddon and Sebastian Marshall on the road.

Thierry Neuville was the rally leader, but the gap between him and his main opponent was not big enough, especially for the Citroën driver, Craig Breen, who was eager to claim his first WRC victory. The Irish driver have once narrowed the gap to less than five seconds. However, the Hyundai star set four fastest stage times to build a 22.7-second lead, though he suffered a paddle shift gearchange system issue at the opening stage. Teammate Andreas Mikkelsen finished third after a spin today which made him dropped from second to fourth place, 9.3 seconds behind Breen. Hayden Paddon's car set-up was unsuited to this morning's forest roads. The New Zealander stuck on the inside of a hairpin in the final stage, which made him lost some time. He ended the day 16.6 seconds behind Mikkelsen. Mads Østberg changed his C3's settings to improve his car's balance but the switches affected his confidence and he reversed the adjustments. There was also an accident in SS13. Kris Meeke nosed into a snow bank but lost engine power when he regained the road. He stopped to clean snow from his Citroën's cooling system and as Ott Tänak tried to overtake in a narrow section, the two cars collided and the Estonian's Toyota Yaris bounced into a ditch. That ended with the Briton's retirement and made five-time world champion Sébastien Ogier finally get into the top ten.

=== Sunday ===
With a comfortable lead, Thierry Neuville finally eased through Sunday's final three speed tests to head Ireland's Craig Breen, driving a Citroën C3, for whom second was a career-best result. Andreas Mikkelsen finished third after a spun at exactly the same point as Neuville. Esapekka Lappi fought back and gained two places in the final three stages to finish fourth, 17.5 seconds adrift of Mikkelsen, after he plunged down the order after burying his Toyota Yaris in a snow bank. A final stage mistake from Hayden Paddon cost him a place. The Kiwi stalled his i20 a couple of kilometres from the finish and trailed the Finn by 8.6 seconds. After only a day's pre-event testing, Mads Østberg was sixth on his debut drive in a C3. Jari-Matti Latvala finished seventh after being delayed by a troublesome front differential and adverse road conditions. Fellow Finn Teemu Suninen was eighth in a Ford Fiesta, the highest place among M-Sport World Rally Team drivers. Ott Tänak and Monte-Carlo winner Sébastien Ogier dropped lot of time in Friday's opening leg as they ploughed a path through deep snow. They were unable to regain lost ground and finished ninth and tenth respectively.

== Results ==
=== World Rally Championship ===
==== Classification ====
Position		No.	Driver	Co-driver	Entrant	Car	Time	Difference	Points	
Event	Class	No.	Driver	Co-driver	Entrant	Car	Time	Difference	Class	Stage
1	1	5	Thierry Neuville	Nicolas Gilsoul	Hyundai Shell Mobis WRT	Hyundai i20 Coupe WRC	2:52:13.1	0.0	25	2
2	2	11	Craig Breen	Scott Martin	Citroën Total Abu Dhabi WRT	Citroën C3 WRC	2:52:32.9	+19.8	18	0
3	3	4	Andreas Mikkelsen	Anders Jæger-Synnevaag	Hyundai Shell Mobis WRT	Hyundai i20 Coupe WRC	2:52:41.4	+28.3	15	3
4	4	9	Esapekka Lappi	Janne Ferm	Toyota Gazoo Racing WRT	Toyota Yaris WRC	2:52:58.9	+45.8	12	5
5	5	6	Hayden Paddon	Sebastian Marshall	Hyundai Shell Mobis WRT	Hyundai i20 Coupe WRC	2:53:07.5	+54.4	10	0
6	6	12	Mads Østberg	Torstein Eriksen	Citroën Total Abu Dhabi WRT	Citroën C3 WRC	2:53:28.4	+1:15.3	8	0
7	7	7	Jari-Matti Latvala	Miikka Anttila	Toyota Gazoo Racing WRT	Toyota Yaris WRC	2:54:18.0	+2:04.9	6	0
8	8	3	Teemu Suninen	Mikko Markkula	M-Sport Ford WRT	Ford Fiesta WRC	2:55:05.3	+2:52.2	4	0
9	9	8	Ott Tänak	Martin Järveoja	Toyota Gazoo Racing WRT	Toyota Yaris WRC	2:55:57.5	+3:44.4	2	1
10	10	1	Sébastien Ogier	Julien Ingrassia	M-Sport Ford WRT	Ford Fiesta WRC	3:00:58.5	+8:45.4	1	4
14	11	2	Elfyn Evans	Daniel Barritt	M-Sport Ford WRT	Ford Fiesta WRC	3:02:00.5	+9:47.4	0	0
19	12	14	Henning Solberg	Cato Menkerud	Henning Solberg	Ford Fiesta WRC	3:08:51.6	+16:38.5	0	0
Retired SS19		10	Kris Meeke	Paul Nagle	Citroën Total Abu Dhabi WRT	Citroën C3 WRC	Withdrawn		0	0
Retired SS19		21	Yazeed Al Rajhi	Michael Orr	Yazeed Racing	Ford Fiesta RS WRC	Withdrawn		0	0

==== Special stages ====
Day	Stage	Name	Length	Winner	Car	Time	Class leader
15 February	—	Skalla [Shakedown]	6.86 km	Neuville / Gilsoul	Hyundai i20 Coupe WRC	4:17.3	—N/a
15 February	SS1	SSS Karlstad 1	1.9 km	Tänak / Järveoja	Toyota Yaris WRC	1:32.7	Tänak / Järveoja
16 February	SS2	Hof-Finnskog 1	21.26 km	Tänak / Järveoja	Toyota Yaris WRC	10:32.7	Tänak / Järveoja
16 February	SS3	Svullrya 1	24.88 km	Thierry Neuville	Hyundai i20 Coupe WRC	13:16.4	Neuville / Gilsoul
16 February	SS4	Röjden 1	19.13 km	Mikkelsen / Jæger-Synnevaag	Hyundai i20 Coupe WRC	10:18.5	Neuville / Gilsoul
16 February	SS5	Hof-Finnskog 2	21.26 km	Paddon / Marshall	Hyundai i20 Coupe WRC	10:19.5	Neuville / Gilsoul
16 February	SS6	Svullrya 2	24.88 km	Breen / Martin	Citroën C3 WRC	13:17.3	Neuville / Gilsoul
16 February	SS7	Röjden 2	19.13 km	Breen / Martin	Citroën C3 WRC	10:06.1	Neuville / Gilsoul
16 February	SS8	Torsby 1	9.56 km	Paddon / Marshall	Hyundai i20 Coupe WRC	6:23.8	Neuville / Gilsoul
17 February	SS9	Torntorp 1	19.88 km	Tänak / Järveoja	Toyota Yaris WRC	10:02.0	Neuville / Gilsoul
17 February	SS10	Hagfors 1	23.4 km	Tänak / Järveoja	Toyota Yaris WRC	12:58.2	Neuville / Gilsoul
17 February	SS11	Vargåsen 1	14.21 km	Neuville / Gilsoul	Hyundai i20 Coupe WRC	8:35.9	Neuville / Gilsoul
17 February	SS12	Torntorp 2	19.88 km	Breen / Martin	Citroën C3 WRC	9:55.3	Neuville / Gilsoul
17 February	SS13	Hagfors 2	23.4 km	Neuville / Gilsoul	Hyundai i20 Coupe WRC	12:44.5	Neuville / Gilsoul
17 February	SS14	Vargåsen 2	14.21 km	Neuville / Gilsoul	Hyundai i20 Coupe WRC	8:28.2	Neuville / Gilsoul
17 February	SS15	SSS Karlstad 2	1.9 km	Tänak / Järveoja	Toyota Yaris WRC	1:34.7	Neuville / Gilsoul
17 February	SS16	Torsby Sprint	3.43 km	Neuville / Gilsoul	Hyundai i20 Coupe WRC	2:32.7	Neuville / Gilsoul
18 February	SS17	Likenäs 1	21.19 km	Tänak / Järveoja	Toyota Yaris WRC	11:11.8	Neuville / Gilsoul
18 February	SS18	Likenäs 2	21.19 km	Lappi / Ferm	Toyota Yaris WRC	11:15.0	Neuville / Gilsoul
18 February	SS19	Torsby 2 [Power stage]	9.56 km	Lappi / Ferm	Toyota Yaris WRC	6:01.2	Neuville / Gilsoul

==== Championship standings ====
Pos.	Drivers' championships			Co-drivers' championships			Manufacturers' championships		
Pos.	Move	Driver	Points	Move	Co-driver	Points	Move	Manufacturer	Points
1	4	Thierry Neuville	41	4	Nicolas Gilsoul	41	3	Hyundai Shell Mobis WRT	54
2	1	Sébastien Ogier	31	1	Julien Ingrassia	31		Toyota Gazoo Racing WRT	53
3		Jari-Matti Latvala	23		Miikka Anttila	23		Citroën Total Abu Dhabi WRT	46
4	2	Esapekka Lappi	23	2	Janne Ferm	23	3	M-Sport Ford World Rally Team	43
5	3	Ott Tänak	21	3	Martin Järveoja	21			

=== World Rally Championship-2 ===
==== Classification ====
Position		No.	Driver	Co-driver	Entrant	Car	Time	Difference	Points	
Event	Class	No.	Driver	Co-driver	Entrant	Car	Time	Difference	Class	Event
12	1	35	Takamoto Katsuta	Marko Salminen	Tommi Mäkinen Racing	Ford Fiesta R5	3:01:27.5	0.0	25	0
13	2	31	Pontus Tidemand	Jonas Andersson	Škoda Motorsport	Škoda Fabia R5	3:01:32.0	+4.5	18	0
14	3	32	Ole Christian Veiby	Stig Rune Skjærmoen	Škoda Motorsport	Škoda Fabia R5	3:01:58.0	+30.5	15	0
15	4	42	Mattias Adielsson	Andreas Johansson	Mattias Adielsson	Škoda Fabia R5	3:03:16.8	+1:49.3	12	0
16	5	43	Janne Tuohino	Reeta Hämäläinen	Toksport World Rally Team	Škoda Fabia R5	3:03:57.4	+2:29.9	10	0
18	6	34	Jari Huttunen	Antti Linnaketo	Hyundai Motorsport	Hyundai i20 R5	3:06:29.6	+5:02.6	8	0
20	7	36	Hiroki Arai	Glenn MacNeall	Tommi Mäkinen Racing	Ford Fiesta R5	3:09:07.7	+7:40.2	6	0
28	8	44	Lars Stugemo	Kalle Lexe	Lars Stugemo	Škoda Fabia R5	3:21:17.8	+19:50.3	4	0
38	9	33	Łukasz Pieniążek	Przemysław Mazur	Printsport	Škoda Fabia R5	3:27:33.7	+26:06.2	2	0
46	10	45	Jarmo Berg	Rami Suorsa	Toksport World Rally Team	Škoda Fabia R5	3:36:39.9	+35:12.4	1	0
49	11	38	Umberto Scandola	Andrea Gaspari	S.A. Motorsport Italia Srl	Škoda Fabia R5	4:02:34.4	+1:01:06.9	0	0
52	12	46	Gianluca Linari	Nicola Arena	Gianluca Linari	Ford Fiesta R5	4:05:46.4	+1:04:18.9	0	0
Retired SS14		41	Fredrik Åhlin	Joakim Sjöberg	Fredrik Åhlin	Škoda Fabia R5	Retired		0	0
Retired SS13		40	Kevin Abbring	Pieter Tsjoen	Kevin Abbring	Ford Fiesta R5	Accident		0	0
Retired SS11		39	Radik Shaymiev	Maxim Tsvetkov	TAIF Motorsport	Ford Fiesta R5	Accident damage		0	0

==== Special stages ====
Day	Stage	Name	Length	Winner	Car	Time	Class leader
15 February	—	Skalla [Shakedown]	6.86 km	Adielsson / Johansson	Škoda Fabia R5	4:31.9	—N/a
15 February	SS1	SSS Karlstad 1	1.9 km	Tidemand / Andersson	Škoda Fabia R5	1:36.8	Tidemand / Andersson
16 February	SS2	Hof-Finnskog 1	21.26 km	Katsuta / Salminen	Ford Fiesta R5	11:06.2	Katsuta / Salminen
16 February	SS3	Svullrya 1	24.88 km	Huttunen / Linnaketo; Katsuta / Salminen	Hyundai i20 R5; Ford Fiesta R5	14:00.9	Katsuta / Salminen
16 February	SS4	Röjden 1	19.13 km	Tidemand / Andersson	Škoda Fabia R5	10:57.9	Katsuta / Salminen
16 February	SS5	Hof-Finnskog 2	21.26 km	Katsuta / Salminen	Ford Fiesta R5	10:54.6	Katsuta / Salminen
16 February	SS6	Svullrya 2	24.88 km	Katsuta / Salminen	Ford Fiesta R5	13:53.0	Katsuta / Salminen
16 February	SS7	Röjden 2	19.13 km	Veiby / Skjærmoen	Škoda Fabia R5	10:41.0	Katsuta / Salminen
16 February	SS8	Torsby 1	9.56 km	Tidemand / Andersson	Škoda Fabia R5	6:41.3	Katsuta / Salminen
17 February	SS9	Torntorp 1	19.88 km	Tidemand / Andersson	Škoda Fabia R5	10:42.1	Tidemand / Andersson
17 February	SS10	Hagfors 1	23.4 km	Katsuta / Salminen	Ford Fiesta R5	13:39.9	Katsuta / Salminen
17 February	SS11	Vargåsen 1	14.21 km	Katsuta / Salminen	Ford Fiesta R5	8:57.9	Katsuta / Salminen
17 February	SS12	Torntorp 2	19.88 km	Arai / MacNeall	Ford Fiesta R5	10:28.6	Katsuta / Salminen
17 February	SS13	Hagfors 2	23.4 km	Katsuta / Salminen	Ford Fiesta R5	13:32.7	Katsuta / Salminen
17 February	SS14	Vargåsen 2	14.21 km	Katsuta / Salminen	Ford Fiesta R5	8:52.9	Katsuta / Salminen
17 February	SS15	SSS Karlstad 2	1.9 km	Tuohino / Hämäläinen; Katsuta / Salminen	Škoda Fabia R5; Ford Fiesta R5	1:38.7	Katsuta / Salminen
17 February	SS16	Torsby Sprint	3.43 km	Veiby / Skjærmoen	Škoda Fabia R5	2:37.6	Katsuta / Salminen
18 February	SS17	Likenäs 1	21.19 km	Tidemand / Andersson	Škoda Fabia R5	12:03.1	Katsuta / Salminen
18 February	SS18	Likenäs 2	21.19 km	Katsuta / Salminen	Ford Fiesta R5	11:47.8	Katsuta / Salminen
18 February	SS19	Torsby 2	9.56 km	Huttunen / Linnaketo	Hyundai i20 R5	6:18.2	Katsuta / Salminen

==== Championship standings ====
Pos.	Drivers' championships			Co-drivers' championships			Teams' championships		
Pos.	Move	Driver	Points	Move	Co-driver	Points	Move	Team	Points
1		Jan Kopecký	25		Pavel Dresler	25		Škoda Motorsport II	25
2		Takamoto Katsuta	25		Marko Salminen	25		Tommi Mäkinen Racing	25
3	1	Eddie Sciessere	18	1	Flavio Zanella	18	1	M-Sport Ford WRT	18
4		Pontus Tidemand	18		Jonas Andersson	18		Škoda Motorsport	18
5	2	Teemu Suninen	15	2	Mikko Markkula	15		Toksport WRT	15

=== World Rally Championship-3 ===
==== Classification ====
Position		No.	Driver	Co-driver	Entrant	Car	Time	Difference	Points	
Event	Class	No.	Driver	Co-driver	Entrant	Car	Time	Difference	Class	Event
23	1	63	Denis Rådström	Johan Johansson	Denis Rådström	Ford Fiesta R2T	3:16:26.0	0.0	25	0
24	2	61	Emil Bergkvist	Ola Fløene	Emil Bergkvist	Ford Fiesta R2T	3:16:33.3	+7.3	18	0
27	3	66	Julius Tannert	Jürgen Heigl	ADAC Sachsen	Ford Fiesta R2T	3:21:09.2	+4:43.2	15	0
29	4	69	Jean-Baptiste Franceschi	Romain Courbon	Jean-Baptiste Franceschi	Ford Fiesta R2T	3:21:18.7	+4:52.7	12	0
31	5	62	Terry Folb	Christopher Guieu	Terry Folb	Ford Fiesta R2T	3:21:20.2	+4:54.2	10	0
33	6	75	Yuriy Protasov	Pavlo Cherepin	Go+Cars Atlas Ward	Citroën DS3 R3T	3:22:49.1	+6:23.1	8	0
34	7	67	Callum Devine	Keith Moriarty	Callum Devine	Ford Fiesta R2T	3:22:53.9	+6:27.9	6	0
37	8	76	Taisko Lario	Tatu Hämäläinen	Taisko Lario	Peugeot 208 R2	3:27:03.3	+10:37.3	4	0
42	9	73	Emilio Fernández	Joaquin Riquelme	Emilio Fernández	Ford Fiesta R2T	3:31:28.1	+15:02.1	2	0
43	10	70	Luca Bottarelli	Manuel Fenoli	ACI Team Italia	Ford Fiesta R2T	3:32:09.9	+15:43.9	1	0
45	11	68	David Holder	Jason Farmer	David Holder	Ford Fiesta R2T	3:35:42.7	+19:16.7	0	0
51	12	72	Tom Williams	Phil Hall	Tom Williams	Ford Fiesta R2T	4:05:11.2	+48:45.2	0	0
54	13	71	Théo Chalal	Jacques-Julien Renucci	Théo Chalal	Ford Fiesta R2T	4:10:26.2	+54:00.2	0	0
55	14	65	Ken Torn	Kuldar Sikk	OT Racing	Ford Fiesta R2T	4:12:18.4	+55:52.4	0	0
Retired SS4		74	Enrico Oldrati	Danilo Fappani	Enrico Oldrati	Ford Fiesta R2T	Radiator		0	0

==== Special stages ====
Day	Stage	Name	Length	Winner	Car	Time	Class leader
15 February	—	Skalla [Shakedown]	6.86 km	Protasov / Cherepin	Citroën DS3 R3T	4:50.9	—N/a
15 February	SS1	SSS Karlstad 1	1.9 km	Rådström / Johnasson	Ford Fiesta R2T	1:48.6	Rådström / Johansson
16 February	SS2	Hof-Finnskog 1	21.26 km	Bergkvist / Fløene	Ford Fiesta R2T	12:09.1	Bergkvist / Fløene
16 February	SS3	Svullrya 1	24.88 km	Rådström / Johansson	Ford Fiesta R2T	15:12.4	Rådström / Johansson
16 February	SS4	Röjden 1	19.13 km	Torn / Sikk	Ford Fiesta R2T	11:41.4	Bergkvist / Fløene; Rådström / Johansson
16 February	SS5	Hof-Finnskog 2	21.26 km	Rådström / Johansson	Ford Fiesta R2T	11:43.5	Rådström / Johansson
16 February	SS6	Svullrya 2	24.88 km	Rådström / Johansson	Ford Fiesta R2T	14:58.4	Rådström / Johansson
16 February	SS7	Röjden 2	19.13 km	Torn / Sikk	Ford Fiesta R2T	11:30.4	Rådström / Johansson
16 February	SS8	Torsby 1	9.56 km	Torn / Sikk	Ford Fiesta R2T	7:14.8	Bergkvist / Fløene
17 February	SS9	Torntorp 1	19.88 km	Rådström / Johansson	Ford Fiesta R2T	11:34.7	Rådström / Johansson
17 February	SS10	Hagfors 1	23.4 km	Lario / Hämäläinen	Peugeot 208 R2	14:54.5	Rådström / Johansson
17 February	SS11	Vargåsen 1	14.21 km	Rådström / Johansson	Ford Fiesta R2T	9:38.4	Rådström / Johansson
17 February	SS12	Torntorp 2	19.88 km	Protasov / Cherepin	Citroën DS3 R3T	11:15.1	Rådström / Johansson
17 February	SS13	Hagfors 2	23.4 km	Lario / Hämäläinen	Peugeot 208 R2	14:38.9	Rådström / Johansson
17 February	SS14	Vargåsen 2	14.21 km	Lario / Hämäläinen	Peugeot 208 R2	9:32.1	Rådström / Johansson
17 February	SS15	SSS Karlstad 2	1.9 km	Bergkvist / Fløene	Ford Fiesta R2T	1:48.4	Rådström / Johansson
17 February	SS16	Torsby Sprint	3.43 km	Fernández / Riquelme	Ford Fiesta R2T	2:52.3	Rådström / Johansson
18 February	SS17	Likenäs 1	21.19 km	Bergkvist / Fløene	Ford Fiesta R2T	13:06.4	Rådström / Johansson
18 February	SS18	Likenäs 2	21.19 km	Bergkvsit / Fløene	Ford Fiesta R2T	12:58.9	Rådström / Johansson
18 February	SS19	Torsby 2	9.56 km	Torn / Sikk	Ford Fiesta R2T	6:49.1	Rådström / Johansson

==== Championship standings ====
Pos.	Drivers' championships			Co-drivers' championships			Teams' championships		
Pos.	Move	Driver	Points	Move	Co-driver	Points	Move	Team	Points
1		Enrico Brazzoli	25		Luca Beltrame	25		ADAC Sachsen	25
2		Denis Rådström	25		Johan Johansson	25		Go+Cars Atlas Ward	18
3		Taisko Lario	19		Tatu Hämäläinen	19		ACI Team Italia	15
4	2	Amaury Molle	18	2	Renaud Herman	18		OT Racing	15
5		Emil Bergkvist	18		Ola Fløene	18			

=== Junior World Rally Championship ===
==== Classification ====
Position		No.	Driver	Co-driver	Entrant	Car	Time	Difference	Points	
Event	Class	No.	Driver	Co-driver	Entrant	Car	Time	Difference	Class	Stage
23	1	63	Denis Rådström	Johan Johansson	Denis Rådström	Ford Fiesta R2T	3:16:26.0	0.0	25	9
24	2	61	Emil Bergkvist	Ola Fløene	Emil Bergkvist	Ford Fiesta R2T	3:16:33.3	+7.3	18	5
27	3	66	Julius Tannert	Jürgen Heigl	ADAC Sachsen	Ford Fiesta R2T	3:21:09.2	+4:43.2	15	0
29	4	69	Jean-Baptiste Franceschi	Romain Courbon	Jean-Baptiste Franceschi	Ford Fiesta R2T	3:21:18.7	+4:52.7	12	0
31	5	62	Terry Folb	Christopher Guieu	Terry Folb	Ford Fiesta R2T	3:21:20.2	+4:54.2	10	0
34	6	67	Callum Devine	Keith Moriarty	Callum Devine	Ford Fiesta R2T	3:22:53.9	+6:27.9	8	0
42	7	73	Emilio Fernández	Joaquin Riquelme	Emilio Fernández	Ford Fiesta R2T	3:31:28.1	+15:02.1	6	1
43	8	70	Luca Bottarelli	Manuel Fenoli	ACI Team Italia	Ford Fiesta R2T	3:32:09.9	+15:43.9	4	0
45	9	68	David Holder	Jason Farmer	David Holder	Ford Fiesta R2T	3:35:42.7	+19:16.7	2	0
51	10	72	Tom Williams	Phil Hall	Tom Williams	Ford Fiesta R2T	4:05:11.2	+48:45.2	1	0
54	11	71	Théo Chalal	Jacques-Julien Renucci	Théo Chalal	Ford Fiesta R2T	4:10:26.2	+54:00.2	0	0
55	12	65	Ken Torn	Kuldar Sikk	OT Racing	Ford Fiesta R2T	4:12:18.4	+55:52.4	0	0
Retired SS4		74	Enrico Oldrati	Danilo Fappani	Enrico Oldrati	Ford Fiesta R2T	Radiator		0	0

==== Special stages ====
Day	Stage	Name	Length	Winner	Car	Time	Class leader
15 February	—	Skalla [Shakedown]	6.86 km	Bergkvist / Fløene	Ford Fiesta R2T	4:55.1	—N/a
15 February	SS1	SSS Karlstad 1	1.9 km	Rådström / Johansson	Ford Fiesta R2T	1:48.6	Rådström / Johansson
16 February	SS2	Hof-Finnskog 1	21.26 km	Bergkvist / Fløene	Ford Fiesta R2T	12:09.1	Bergkvist / Fløene
16 February	SS3	Svullrya 1	24.88 km	Rådström / Johansson	Ford Fiesta R2T	15:12.4	Rådström / Johansson
16 February	SS4	Röjden 1	19.13 km	Torn / Sikk	Ford Fiesta R2T	11:41.4	Bergkvist / Fløene; Rådström / Johansson
16 February	SS5	Hof-Finnskog 2	21.26 km	Rådström / Johansson	Ford Fiesta R2T	11:43.5	Rådström / Johansson
16 February	SS6	Svullrya 2	24.88 km	Rådström / Johansson	Ford Fiesta R2T	14:58.4	Rådström / Johansson
16 February	SS7	Röjden 2	19.13 km	Torn / Sikk	Ford Fiesta R2T	11:30.4	Rådström / Johansson
16 February	SS8	Torsby 1	9.56 km	Torn / Sikk	Ford Fiesta R2T	7:14.8	Bergkvist / Fløene
17 February	SS9	Torntorp 1	19.88 km	Rådström / Johansson	Ford Fiesta R2T	11:34.7	Rådström / Johansson
17 February	SS10	Hagfors 1	23.4 km	Rådström / Johansson	Ford Fiesta R2T	14:57.0	Rådström / Johansson
17 February	SS11	Vargåsen 1	14.21 km	Rådström / Johansson	Ford Fiesta R2T	9:38.4	Rådström / Johansson
17 February	SS12	Torntorp 2	19.88 km	Rådström / Johansson	Ford Fiesta R2T	11:19.2	Rådström / Johansson
17 February	SS13	Hagfors 2	23.4 km	Bergkvist / Fløene	Ford Fiesta R2T	14:39.0	Rådström / Johansson
17 February	SS14	Vargåsen 2	14.21 km	Rådström / Johansson	Ford Fiesta R2T	9:32.8	Rådström / Johansson
17 February	SS15	SSS Karlstad 2	1.9 km	Bergkvist / Fløene	Ford Fiesta R2T	1:48.4	Rådström / Johansson
17 February	SS16	Torsby Sprint	3.43 km	Fernández / Riquelme	Ford Fiesta R2T	2:52.3	Rådström / Johansson
18 February	SS17	Likenäs 1	21.19 km	Bergkvist / Fløene	Ford Fiesta R2T	13:06.4	Rådström / Johansson
18 February	SS18	Likenäs 2	21.19 km	Bergkvist / Fløene	Ford Fiesta R2T	12:58.9	Rådström / Johansson
18 February	SS19	Torsby 2	9.56 km	Torn / Sikk	Ford Fiesta R2T	6:49.1	Rådström / Johansson

==== Championship standings ====
Pos.	Drivers' championships			Co-drivers' championships			Nations' championships		
Pos.	Move	Driver	Points	Move	Co-driver	Points	Move	Team	Points
1		Denis Rådström	34		Johan Johansson	34		Sweden	25
2		Emil Bergkvist	23		Ola Fløene	23		Germany	18
3		Julius Tannert	15		Jürgen Heigl	15		France	15
4		Jean-Baptiste Franceschi	12		Romain Courbon	12		Ireland	12
5		Terry Folb	10		Christopher Guieu	10		Chile	10

== Notes ==
Previous rally: 2018 Monte Carlo Rally	2018 FIA World Rally Championship	Next rally: 2018 Rally Mexico
Previous rally: 2017 Rally Sweden	2018 Rally Sweden	Next rally: 2019 Rally Sweden
