= 2018 Rallye Deutschland =

2018 race in Sankt Wendel, Germany

2018 Rally Deutschland: 36. ADAC Rallye Deutschland 2018
Round 9 of 13 in the 2018 World Rally Championship
← Previous event	Next event →
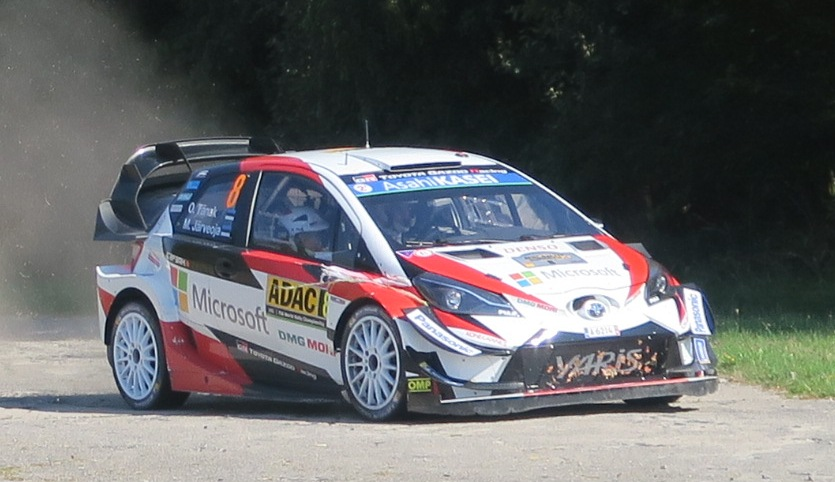
- Eventual winning crew Ott Tänak and Martin Järveoja during the rally.
- Host country: Germany
- Rally base: Bostalsee, Saarland
- Dates run: 16 – 19 August 2018
- Start location: Winterbach, Saarland
- Finish location: Sankt Wendel, Saarland
- Stages: 18 (325.76 km; 202.42 miles)
- Stage surface: Tarmac
- Transport distance: 896.13 km (556.83 miles)
- Overall distance: 1,221.89 km (759.25 miles)

Statistics
- Crews registered: 64
- Crews: 60 at start, 45 at finish

Overall results
- Overall winner: (Estonia) Ott Tänak (Estonia) Martin Järveoja (Japan) Toyota Gazoo Racing WRT; 3:03:36.9
- Power Stage winner: (France) Sébastien Ogier (France) Julien Ingrassia (United Kingdom) M-Sport Ford WRT

Support category results
- WRC-2 winner: (Czech Republic) Jan Kopecký (Czech Republic) Pavel Dresler (Czech Republic) Škoda Motorsport II; 3:16:49.7
- WRC-3 winner: (Finland) Taisko Lario (Finland) Tatu Hämäläinen (Finland) Taisko Lario; 3:49:47.9

The 2018 Rallye Deutschland (formally known as the ADAC Rallye Deutschland 2018) was a motor racing event for rally cars held over four days between 16 and 19 August 2018. It marked the thirty-sixth running of Rallye Deutschland, and was the ninth round of the 2018 FIA World Rally Championship and its support categories, the WRC-2 and WRC-3 championships. The event was based at Sankt Wendel in the countryside surrounding the Bostalsee in Saarland, and consisted of eighteen special stages totalling 325.76 km (202.42 mi) in competitive kilometres.

Ott Tänak and Martin Järveoja were the defending rally winners and they successfully defended their title. The Škoda Motorsport II crew of Jan Kopecký and Pavel Dresler won the World Rally Championship-2 category in a Škoda Fabia R5, while Finnish crew Taisko Lario and Tatu Hämäläinen won the World Rally Championship-3.

== Background ==
=== Championship standings prior to the event ===
Thierry Neuville and Nicolas Gilsoul entered the round with a twenty-one-point lead in the World Championship for Drivers and Co-drivers. In the World Championship for Manufacturers, Hyundai Shell Mobis WRT held a twenty-six-point lead over M-Sport Ford WRT.

=== Entry list ===
The following crews were entered into the rally. The event was opened to crews competing in the World Rally Championship, World Rally Championship-2, and the World Rally Championship-3. The final entry list consisted of thirteen World Rally Car entries, nineteen entries in World Rally Championship-2, and three World Rally Championship-3 entries.

No.	Entrant	Driver	Co-Driver	Car	Tyre
World Rally Car entries
1	(United Kingdom) M-Sport Ford WRT	(France) Sébastien Ogier	(France) Julien Ingrassia	Ford Fiesta WRC	MI
2	(United Kingdom) M-Sport Ford WRT	(United Kingdom) Elfyn Evans	(United Kingdom) Daniel Barritt	Ford Fiesta WRC	MI
3	(United Kingdom) M-Sport Ford WRT	(Finland) Teemu Suninen	(Finland) Mikko Markkula	Ford Fiesta WRC	MI
4	(South Korea) Hyundai Shell Mobis WRT	(Norway) Andreas Mikkelsen	(Norway) Anders Jæger-Synnevaag	Hyundai i20 Coupe WRC	MI
5	(South Korea) Hyundai Shell Mobis WRT	(Belgium) Thierry Neuville	(Belgium) Nicolas Gilsoul	Hyundai i20 Coupe WRC	MI
6	(South Korea) Hyundai Shell Mobis WRT	(Spain) Dani Sordo	(Spain) Carlos del Barrio	Hyundai i20 Coupe WRC	MI
7	(Japan) Toyota Gazoo Racing WRT	(Finland) Jari-Matti Latvala	(Finland) Miikka Anttila	Toyota Yaris WRC	MI
8	(Japan) Toyota Gazoo Racing WRT	(Estonia) Ott Tänak	(Estonia) Martin Järveoja	Toyota Yaris WRC	MI
9	(Japan) Toyota Gazoo Racing WRT	(Finland) Esapekka Lappi	(Finland) Janne Ferm	Toyota Yaris WRC	MI
10	(France) Citroën Total Abu Dhabi WRT	(Norway) Mads Østberg	(Norway) Torstein Eriksen	Citroën C3 WRC	MI
11	(France) Citroën Total Abu Dhabi WRT	(Republic of Ireland) Craig Breen	(United Kingdom) Scott Martin	Citroën C3 WRC	MI
21	(United Kingdom) M-Sport World Rally Team	(Greece) Jourdan Serderidis	(Belgium) Frédéric Miclotte	Ford Fiesta WRC	MI
22	(Germany) Marijan Griebel	(Germany) Marijan Griebel	(Germany) Alexander Rath	Citroën DS3 WRC	MI
World Rally Championship-2 entries
31	(Czech Republic) Škoda Motorsport II	(Czech Republic) Jan Kopecký	(Czech Republic) Pavel Dresler	Škoda Fabia R5	MI
32	(United Kingdom) Gus Greensmith	(United Kingdom) Gus Greensmith	(United Kingdom) Stuart Loudon (Note: Gus Greensmith's co-driver Craig Parry was replaced by Stuart Loudon due to the injury caused by the accident in testing.)	Ford Fiesta R5	MI
33	(Finland) Printsport	(Poland) Łukasz Pieniążek	(Poland) Przemysław Mazur	Škoda Fabia R5	MI
34	(Italy) ACI Team Italia WRC	(Italy) Fabio Andolfi	(Italy) Simone Scattolin	Škoda Fabia R5	P
35	(Spain) Nil Solans	(Spain) Nil Solans	(Spain) Miquel Ibáñez Sotos	Ford Fiesta R5	P
36	(Italy) BRC Racing Team	(France) Pierre-Louis Loubet	(France) Vincent Landais	Hyundai i20 R5	MI
37	(France) Citroën Total Rallye Team	(France) Stéphane Lefebvre	(France) Gabin Moreau	Citroën C3 R5	MI
38	(Italy) Eddie Sciessere	(Italy) Eddie Sciessere	(Italy) Elia Ometto Pietro	Škoda Fabia R5	MI
39	(France) CHL Sport Auto	(France) Yoann Bonato	(France) Benjamin Boulloud	Citroën C3 R5	MI
40	(South Korea) Hyundai Motorsport	(Finland) Jari Huttunen	(Finland) Antti Linnaketo	Hyundai i20 R5	MI
41	(France) Nicolas Ciamin	(France) Nicolas Ciamin	(France) Thibault de la Haye	Hyundai i20 R5	MI
42	(Italy) S.A. Motorsport Italia Srl	(Mexico) Benito Guerra Jr.	(Spain) Borja Rozada	Škoda Fabia R5	P
43	(Germany) Škoda Auto Deutschland	(Germany) Fabian Kreim	(Germany) Frank Christian	Škoda Fabia R5	P
44	(Czech Republic) Škoda Motorsport II	(Finland) Kalle Rovanperä	(Finland) Jonne Halttunen	Škoda Fabia R5	MI
45	(Poland) Lotos Rally Team	(Poland) Kajetan Kajetanowicz	(Poland) Maciej Szczepaniak	Ford Fiesta R5	P
46	(France) Citroën Total Rallye Team	(Romania) Simone Tempestini	(Romania) Sergio Itu	Citroën C3 R5	MI
47	(United Kingdom) M-Sport Ford WRT	(France) Eric Camilli	(France) Benjamin Veillas	Ford Fiesta R5	MI
48	(Italy) S.A. Motorsport Italia Srl	(Italy) Umberto Scandola	(Italy) Andrea Gaspari	Škoda Fabia R5	DM
49	(Spain) Hyundai Motor España	(Spain) José Antonio Suárez	(Spain) Cándido Carrera	Hyundai i20 R5	MI
World Rally Championship-3 entries
62	(Italy) Enrico Brazzoli	(Italy) Enrico Brazzoli	(Italy) Luca Beltrame	Peugeot 208 R2	DM
63	(Finland) Taisko Lario	(Finland) Taisko Lario	(Finland) Tatu Hämäläinen	Peugeot 208 R2	P
64	(France) Terry Folb	(France) Terry Folb (Note: Terry Folb withdrew from the event.)	(France) Kevin Bronner	Ford Fiesta R2T	P
65	(United Kingdom) Louise Cook	(United Kingdom) Louise Cook	(United Kingdom) Stefan Davis	Ford Fiesta R2T	MI
Other Major Entries
61	Équipe de France FFSA Rally	(France) Jean-Baptiste Franceschi (Note: Jean-Baptiste Franceschi was originally in WRC-3 category.)	(France) Romain Courbon	Ford Fiesta R2T	P
81	(Finland) Printsport	(Norway) Ole Christian Veiby	(Norway) Stig Rune Skjærmoen	Škoda Fabia R5	P
82	(Germany) Albert von Thurn und Taxis	(Germany) Albert von Thurn und Taxis	(Germany) Klaus Wicha	Škoda Fabia R5	P

== Report ==
=== Thursday ===
Ott Tänak, who won the Shakedown, topped his Yaris over the WRC 2 category leader Kalle Rovanperä by just one-tenth of a second, while the young Norwegian Ole Christian Veiby was another slender 0.1 second behind. Returned Dani Sordo cleared the stage in fourth, followed by another experienced WRC 2 driver Jan Kopecký. Defending world champion Sébastien Ogier finished in seventh, ahead of Andreas Mikkelsen and Craig Breen by 0.1 and 0.2 second respectively. Two WRC 2 drivers, Umberto Scandola and Kajetan Kajetanowicz completed the top ten.

=== Friday ===
Five-time world champion Sébastien Ogier was the fastest man to finish the day other than the defending rally winner Ott Tänak, who set five out of six fastest stage times and built a 12.3-second lead over the Frenchman, while championship leader Thierry Neuville was another 15.1 seconds behind. Elfyn Evans climbed up three places in the afternoon loop and edged Jari-Matti Latvala by a second. Dani Sordo completed the day in sixth, only one-tenth of a second ahead of Esapekka Lappi, who failed to come to terms with dirt dragged onto the roads by the early starters. Craig Breen lost some time due to being caught in a heavy rain shower in the early stage in the eighth place, followed by Andreas Mikkelsen, who was struggling with his i20's handling and chose to change his driving style, in ninth, only one second behind. Teemu Suninen, driving a third Fiesta, in tenth. Lacking of power caused Mads Østberg to fail to find the pace like Finland, which made him cleared the day off the leaderboard in eleventh overall.

=== Saturday ===
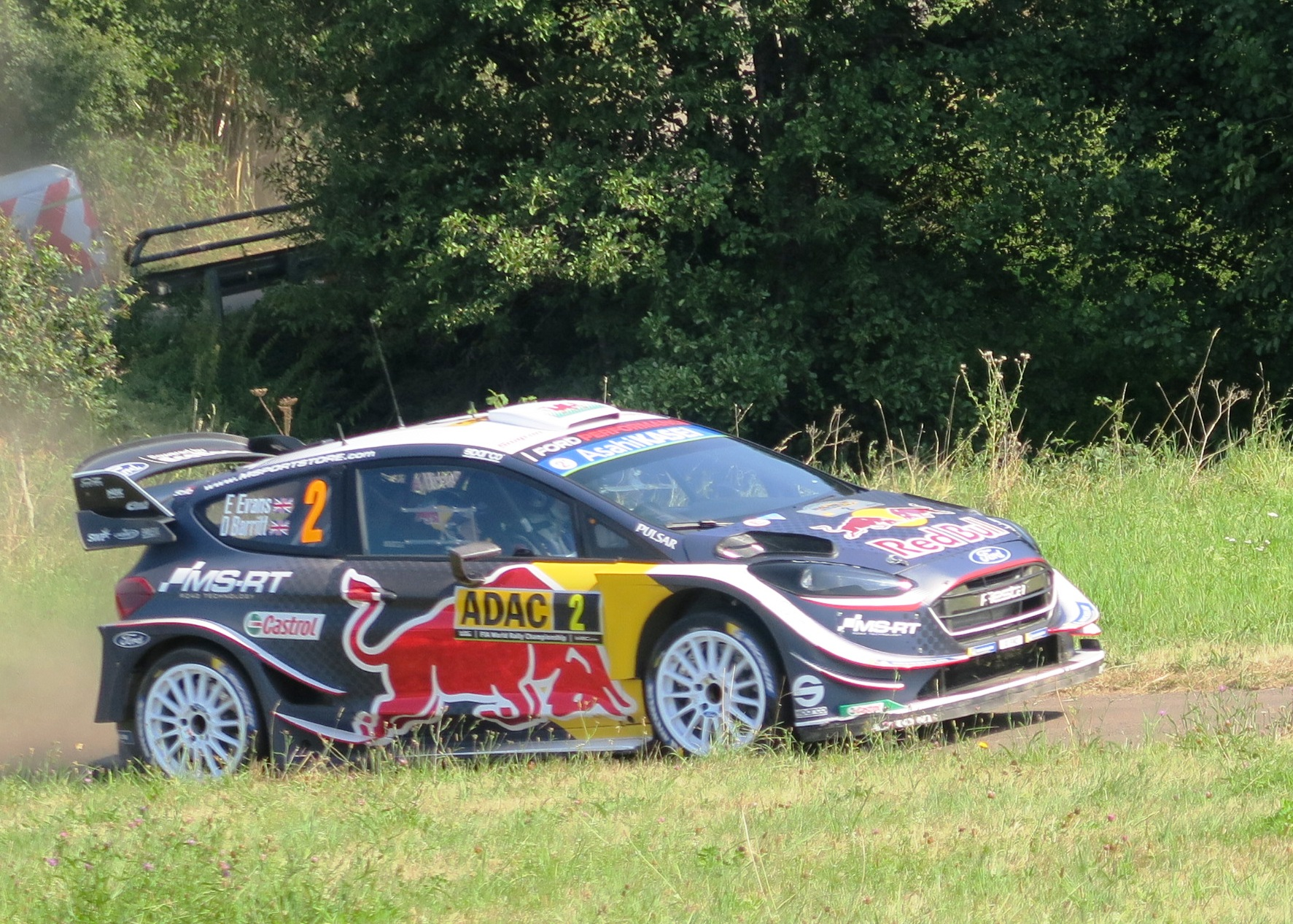
The Ford Fiesta WRC of Elfyn Evans and Daniel Barritt crew during the rally.

Saturday turned out to be a total disaster for Ford. First in the early stage, Elfyn Evans retired his Ford Fiesta from the day after sliding into a field, damaging the left front wheel in the process. Then in the afternoon loop, Second-place Sébastien Ogier suffered a puncture due to hitting a rock in the second pass through the marathon Panzerplatte military road test, dropping him five places to seventh overall, half a second behind Andreas Mikkelsen in front. This further extended Ott Tänak's lead to 43.7 seconds. This time over Dani Sordo, who edged Jari-Matti Latvala by just 0.8 second after a hot fight. Championship leader Thierry Neuville struggled for pace in his i20. He switched back to yesterday's differential and gearbox settings and found a comfortable rhythm. The Belgian eventually ended the day in fourth, eight seconds ahead of Esapekka Lappi. Teemu Suninen climbed up to eighth after Craig Breen crashed in the final stage and damaged his Citroën C3's rear left suspension and dropped down to tenth place, followed by Mads Østberg cleared the day in ninth after a trouble free day.

=== Sunday ===
The opening stage saw a dramatic start to final day of the event. Tenth-place Mads Østberg, who was third on road, went off into a field and forced to retire from the event. Dani Sordo and Jari-Matti Latvala should have a fierce competition for second place, but an accident damage, which is happened on the Spaniard，and a transmission failure, which is happened on the Finn, burned the battle to ash. The biggest beneficiary of the chaos is championship leader Thierry Neuville, who was pushed up to the second place after the two's retirement.

The king of the event is obviously Ott Tänak, who led the entire rally but one stage. The Estonian took his first back-to-back victory in his career and now eats the gap to top to thirty-six points in the drivers' championships. Teammate Esapekka Lappi finished third, 21.7 seconds behind Thierry Neuville. With a 1-3 finish, Toyota overtook Ford to second in the manufacturers' championships, only thirteen points behind Hyundai. Although defending world champion Sébastien Ogier won the Power Stage, the outcome of fourth place finish still failed to narrow the gap to championship leader Thierry Neuville — it is up to twenty-three points after the event. Teammate Teemu Suninen completed the rally with a fifth-place finish after a consistent weekend, followed by Andreas Mikkelsen in sixth. Craig Breen finished in seventh, while localman Marijan Griebel finished in eighth. WRC 2 leader Jan Kopecký and seventeen-year-old Kalle Rovanperä completed the leaderboard.

== Classification ==
=== Top ten finishers ===
The following crews finished the rally in each class's top ten. (Note: Only crews contesting the World Rally Championship, World Rally Championship-2 and World Rally Championship-3 are listed.)

Position		No.	Driver	Co-driver	Entrant	Car	Time	Difference	Points	
Event	Class	No.	Driver	Co-driver	Entrant	Car	Time	Difference	Class	Stage
Overall classification
1	1	8	(Estonia) Ott Tänak	(Estonia) Martin Järveoja	(Japan) Toyota Gazoo Racing WRT	Toyota Yaris WRC	3:03:36.9	0.0	25	4
2	2	5	(Belgium) Thierry Neuville	(Belgium) Nicolas Gilsoul	(South Korea) Hyundai Shell Mobis WRT	Hyundai i20 Coupe WRC	3:04:16.1	+39.2	18	1
3	3	9	(Finland) Esapekka Lappi	(Finland) Janne Ferm	(Japan) Toyota Gazoo Racing WRT	Toyota Yaris WRC	3:04:37.8	+1:00.9	15	3
4	4	1	(France) Sébastien Ogier	(France) Julien Ingrassia	(United Kingdom) M-Sport Ford WRT	Ford Fiesta WRC	3:05:11.4	+1:34.5	12	5
5	5	3	(Finland) Teemu Suninen	(Finland) Mikko Markkula	(United Kingdom) M-Sport Ford WRT	Ford Fiesta WRC	3:05:39.8	+2:02.9	10	0
6	6	4	(Norway) Andreas Mikkelsen	(Norway) Anders Jæger-Synnevaag	(South Korea) Hyundai Shell Mobis WRT	Hyundai i20 Coupe WRC	3:05:50.7	+2:13.8	8	0
7	7	11	(Republic of Ireland) Craig Breen	(United Kingdom) Scott Martin	(France) Citroën Total Abu Dhabi WRT	Citroën C3 WRC	3:06:16.0	+2:39.1	6	2
8	8	22	(Germany) Marijan Griebel	(Germany) Alexander Rath	(Germany) Marijan Griebel	Citroën DS3 WRC	3:14:18.1	+10:41.2	4	0
9	9	31	(Czech Republic) Jan Kopecký	(Czech Republic) Pavel Dresler	(Czech Republic) Škoda Motorsport II	Škoda Fabia R5	3:16:49.7	+13:12.8	2	0
10	10	44	(Finland) Kalle Rovanperä	(Finland) Jonne Halttunen	(Czech Republic) Škoda Motorsport II	Škoda Fabia R5	3:16:53.5	+13:16.6	1	0
World Rally Championship-2
9	1	31	(Czech Republic) Jan Kopecký	(Czech Republic) Pavel Dresler	(Czech Republic) Škoda Motorsport II	Škoda Fabia R5	3:16:49.7	0.0	25	—
10	2	44	(Finland) Kalle Rovanperä	(Finland) Jonne Halttunen	(Czech Republic) Škoda Motorsport II	Škoda Fabia R5	3:16:53.5	+3.8	18	—
11	3	34	(Italy) Fabio Andolfi	(Italy) Simone Scattolin	(Italy) ACI Team Italia WRC	Škoda Fabia R5	3:17:07.8	+18.1	15	—
12	4	43	(Germany) Fabian Kreim	(Germany) Frank Christian	(Germany) Škoda Auto Deutschland	Škoda Fabia R5	3:17:40.6	+50.9	12	—
13	5	45	(Poland) Kajetan Kajetanowicz	(Poland) Maciej Szczepaniak	(Poland) Lotos Rally Team	Ford Fiesta R5	3:17:44.1	+54.4	10	—
14	6	33	(Poland) Łukasz Pieniążek	(Poland) Przemysław Mazur	(Finland) Printsport	Škoda Fabia R5	3:19:10.1	+2:20.4	8	—
15	7	41	(France) Nicolas Ciamin	(France) Thibault de la Haye	(France) Nicolas Ciamin	Hyundai i20 R5	3:19:11.8	+2:22.1	6	—
16	8	37	(France) Stéphane Lefebvre	(France) Gabin Moreau	(France) Citroën Total Rallye Team	Citroën C3 R5	3:19:49.6	+2:59.9	4	—
19	9	42	(Mexico) Benito Guerra Jr.	(Spain) Borja Rozada	(Italy) S.A. Motorsport Italia Srl	Škoda Fabia R5	3:22:47.5	+5:57.8	2	—
20	10	46	(Romania) Simone Tempestini	(Romania) Sergio Itu	(France) Citroën Total Rallye Team	Citroën C3 R5	3:24:42.1	+7:52.4	1	—
World Rally Championship-3
30	1	63	(Finland) Taisko Lario	(Finland) Tatu Hämäläinen	(Finland) Taisko Lario	Peugeot 208 R2	3:49:47.9	0.0	25	—
35	2	62	(Italy) Enrico Brazzoli	(Italy) Luca Beltrame	(Italy) Enrico Brazzoli	Peugeot 208 R2	4:01:25.7	+11:37.8	18	—
38	3	65	(United Kingdom) Louise Cook	(United Kingdom) Stefan Davis	(United Kingdom) Louise Cook	Ford Fiesta R2T	4:09:33.2	+19:45.3	15	—

=== Other notable finishers ===
The following notable crews finished the rally outside top ten.

Position		No.	Driver	Co-driver	Entrant	Car	Class	Time	Points
Event	Class	No.	Driver	Co-driver	Entrant	Car	Class	Time	Stage
25	25	2	(United Kingdom) Elfyn Evans	(United Kingdom) Daniel Barritt	(United Kingdom) M-Sport Ford WRT	Ford Fiesta WRC	WRC	3:40:04.0	0
26	11	39	(France) Yoann Bonato	(France) Benjamin Boulloud	(France) CHL Sport Auto	Citroën C3 R5	WRC-2	3:43:11.2	—
27	12	40	(Finland) Jari Huttunen	(Finland) Antti Linnaketo	(South Korea) Hyundai Motorsport	Hyundai i20 R5	WRC-2	3:44:57.1	—

=== Special stages ===
Overall classification
Day	Stage	Name	Length	Winner	Car	Time	Class leader
16 August	—	St. Wendeler Land [Shakedown]	5.52 km	(Estonia) Ott Tänak	Toyota Yaris WRC	2:52.9	—N/a
16 August	SS1	St. Wendel	2.04 km	(Estonia) Ott Tänak	Toyota Yaris WRC	2:11.2	(Estonia) Ott Tänak
17 August	SS2	Stein und Wein 1	19.44 km	(France) Sébastien Ogier	Ford Fiesta WRC	10:50.2	(France) Sébastien Ogier
17 August	SS3	Mittelmosel 1	22.00 km	(Estonia) Ott Tänak	Toyota Yaris WRC	12:25.2	(Estonia) Ott Tänak
17 August	SS4	Wadern – Weiskichen 1	9.27 km	(Estonia) Ott Tänak	Toyota Yaris WRC	5:06.7	(Estonia) Ott Tänak
17 August	SS5	Stein und Wein 2	19.44 km	(Estonia) Ott Tänak	Toyota Yaris WRC	11:03.2	(Estonia) Ott Tänak
17 August	SS6	Mittelmosel 2	22.00 km	(Estonia) Ott Tänak	Toyota Yaris WRC	12:36.9	(Estonia) Ott Tänak
17 August	SS7	Wadern – Weiskichen 2	9.27 km	(Estonia) Ott Tänak	Toyota Yaris WRC	5:07.5	(Estonia) Ott Tänak
18 August	SS8	Arena Panzerplatte 1	9.43 km	(Finland) Jari-Matti Latvala	Toyota Yaris WRC	5:26.4	(Estonia) Ott Tänak
18 August	SS9	Panzerplatte 1	38.57 km	(Spain) Dani Sordo	Hyundai i20 Coupe WRC	21:55.7	(Estonia) Ott Tänak
18 August	SS10	Freisen 1	14.78 km	(Finland) Esapekka Lappi	Toyota Yaris WRC	8:28.4	(Estonia) Ott Tänak
18 August	SS11	Römerstraße 1	12.28 km	(Republic of Ireland) Craig Breen	Citroën C3 WRC	6:03.3	(Estonia) Ott Tänak
18 August	SS12	Arena Panzerplatte 2	9.43 km	(Spain) Dani Sordo	Hyundai i20 Coupe WRC	5:23.9	(Estonia) Ott Tänak
18 August	SS13	Panzerplatte 2	38.57 km	(Spain) Dani Sordo	Hyundai i20 Coupe WRC	21:55.4	(Estonia) Ott Tänak
18 August	SS14	Freisen 2	14.78 km	(France) Sébastien Ogier	Ford Fiesta WRC	8:31.8	(Estonia) Ott Tänak
18 August	SS15	Römerstraße 2	12.28 km	(Finland) Jari-Matti Latvala	Toyota Yaris WRC	6:05.6	(Estonia) Ott Tänak
19 August	SS16	Grafschaft 1	29.07 km	(Belgium) Thierry Neuville	Hyundai i20 Coupe WRC	16:17.7	(Estonia) Ott Tänak
19 August	SS17	Grafschaft 2	29.07 km	(France) Sébastien Ogier	Ford Fiesta WRC	16:15.0	(Estonia) Ott Tänak
19 August	SS18	Bosenberg [Power stage]	14.97 km	(France) Sébastien Ogier	Ford Fiesta WRC	7:15.0	(Estonia) Ott Tänak
World Rally Championship-2
16 August	—	St. Wendeler Land [Shakedown]	5.52 km	(France) Eric Camilli	Ford Fiesta R5	3:04.5	—N/a
16 August	SS1	St. Wendel	2.04 km	(Finland) Kalle Rovanperä	Škoda Fabia R5	2:11.3	(Finland) Kalle Rovanperä
17 August	SS2	Stein und Wein 1	19.44 km	(Czech Republic) Jan Kopecký	Škoda Fabia R5	11:34.3	(Czech Republic) Jan Kopecký
17 August	SS3	Mittelmosel 1	22.00 km	(Germany) Fabian Kreim	Škoda Fabia R5	13:54.4	(Czech Republic) Jan Kopecký
17 August	SS4	Wadern – Weiskichen 1	9.27 km	(Finland) Kalle Rovanperä	Škoda Fabia R5	5:31.5	(Czech Republic) Jan Kopecký
17 August	SS5	Stein und Wein 2	19.44 km	(Czech Republic) Jan Kopecký	Škoda Fabia R5	11:41.6	(Czech Republic) Jan Kopecký
17 August	SS6	Mittelmosel 2	22.00 km	(Spain) Nil Solans	Ford Fiesta R5	13:23.8	(Czech Republic) Jan Kopecký
17 August	SS7	Wadern – Weiskichen 2	9.27 km	(Czech Republic) Jan Kopecký	Škoda Fabia R5	5:29.3	(Czech Republic) Jan Kopecký
18 August	SS8	Arena Panzerplatte 1	9.43 km	(Italy) Fabio Andolfi	Škoda Fabia R5	5:46.4	(Czech Republic) Jan Kopecký
18 August	SS9	Panzerplatte 1	38.57 km	(France) Stéphane Lefebvre	Citroën C3 R5	23:22.0	(France) Eric Camilli
18 August	SS10	Freisen 1	14.78 km	(Czech Republic) Jan Kopecký	Škoda Fabia R5	8:58.7	(France) Eric Camilli
18 August	SS11	Römerstraße 1	12.28 km	(Czech Republic) Jan Kopecký	Škoda Fabia R5	6:30.1	(France) Eric Camilli
18 August	SS12	Arena Panzerplatte 2	9.43 km	(Czech Republic) Jan Kopecký	Škoda Fabia R5	5:41.0	(France) Eric Camilli
18 August	SS13	Panzerplatte 2	38.57 km	(Czech Republic) Jan Kopecký	Škoda Fabia R5	23:03.4	(France) Eric Camilli
18 August	SS14	Freisen 2	14.78 km	(Czech Republic) Jan Kopecký	Škoda Fabia R5	8:58.9	(Italy) Fabio Andolfi
18 August	SS15	Römerstraße 2	12.28 km	(Czech Republic) Jan Kopecký	Škoda Fabia R5	6:29.2	(Finland) Kalle Rovanperä
19 August	SS16	Grafschaft 1	29.07 km	(Czech Republic) Jan Kopecký	Škoda Fabia R5	17:20.8	(Finland) Kalle Rovanperä
19 August	SS17	Grafschaft 2	29.07 km	(Czech Republic) Jan Kopecký	Škoda Fabia R5	17:07.7	(Czech Republic) Jan Kopecký
19 August	SS18	Bosenberg	14.97 km	(Czech Republic) Jan Kopecký	Škoda Fabia R5	7:45.5	(Czech Republic) Jan Kopecký
World Rally Championship-3
16 August	—	St. Wendeler Land [Shakedown]	5.52 km	(Finland) Taisko Lario	Peugeot 208 R2	3:32.0	—N/a
16 August	SS1	St. Wendel	2.04 km	(Finland) Taisko Lario	Peugeot 208 R2	2:31.3	(Finland) Taisko Lario
17 August	SS2	Stein und Wein 1	19.44 km	(Finland) Taisko Lario	Peugeot 208 R2	13:28.5	(Finland) Taisko Lario
17 August	SS3	Mittelmosel 1	22.00 km	(Finland) Taisko Lario	Peugeot 208 R2	16:26.6	(Finland) Taisko Lario
17 August	SS4	Wadern – Weiskichen 1	9.27 km	(Finland) Taisko Lario	Peugeot 208 R2	6:20.3	(Finland) Taisko Lario
17 August	SS5	Stein und Wein 2	19.44 km	(Finland) Taisko Lario	Peugeot 208 R2	13:31.7	(Finland) Taisko Lario
17 August	SS6	Mittelmosel 2	22.00 km	(Finland) Taisko Lario	Peugeot 208 R2	15:40.5	(Finland) Taisko Lario
17 August	SS7	Wadern – Weiskichen 2	9.27 km	(Italy) Enrico Brazzoli	Peugeot 208 R2	6:27.0	(Finland) Taisko Lario
18 August	SS8	Arena Panzerplatte 1	9.43 km	(Italy) Enrico Brazzoli	Peugeot 208 R2	6:51.5	(Finland) Taisko Lario
18 August	SS9	Panzerplatte 1	38.57 km	(Italy) Enrico Brazzoli	Peugeot 208 R2	27:01.1	(Finland) Taisko Lario
18 August	SS10	Freisen 1	14.78 km	(Finland) Taisko Lario	Peugeot 208 R2	10:28.2	(Finland) Taisko Lario
18 August	SS11	Römerstraße 1	12.28 km	(Finland) Taisko Lario	Peugeot 208 R2	7:32.5	(Finland) Taisko Lario
18 August	SS12	Arena Panzerplatte 2	9.43 km	(Italy) Enrico Brazzoli	Peugeot 208 R2	6:37.9	(Finland) Taisko Lario
18 August	SS13	Panzerplatte 2	38.57 km	(Italy) Enrico Brazzoli	Peugeot 208 R2	27:05.8	(Finland) Taisko Lario
18 August	SS14	Freisen 2	14.78 km	(Finland) Taisko Lario	Peugeot 208 R2	10:31.2	(Finland) Taisko Lario
18 August	SS15	Römerstraße 2	12.28 km	(Finland) Taisko Lario	Peugeot 208 R2	7:41.6	(Finland) Taisko Lario
19 August	SS16	Grafschaft 1	29.07 km	(Finland) Taisko Lario	Peugeot 208 R2	20:47.5	(Finland) Taisko Lario
19 August	SS17	Grafschaft 2	29.07 km	(United Kingdom) Louise Cook	Ford Fiesta R2T	20:34.9	(Finland) Taisko Lario
19 August	SS18	Bosenberg	14.97 km	(Finland) Taisko Lario	Peugeot 208 R2	9:26.0	(Finland) Taisko Lario

=== Power stage ===
The Power stage was a 14.97 km stage at the end of the rally. Additional World Championship points were awarded to the five fastest crews.

Pos.	Driver	Co-driver	Car	Time	Diff.	Pts.
1	(France) Sébastien Ogier	(France) Julien Ingrassia	Ford Fiesta WRC	7:15.0	0.0	5
2	(Estonia) Ott Tänak	(Estonia) Martin Järveoja	Toyota Yaris WRC	7:15.1	+0.1	4
3	(Finland) Esapekka Lappi	(Finland) Janne Ferm	Toyota Yaris WRC	7:19.0	+4.0	3
4	(Republic of Ireland) Craig Breen	(United Kingdom) Scott Martin	Citroën C3 WRC	7:19.2	+4.2	2
5	(Belgium) Thierry Neuville	(Belgium) Nicolas Gilsoul	Hyundai i20 Coupe WRC	7:21.7	+6.7	1

=== Penalties ===
The following notable crews were given time penalty during the rally.

Stage	No.	Driver	Co-driver	Entrant	Car	Class	Reason	Penalty
SS3	41	(France) Nicolas Ciamin	(France) Thibault de la Haye	(France) Nicolas Ciamin	Hyundai i20 R5	WRC-2	1 minute late	0:10
SS6	35	(Spain) Nil Solans	(Spain) Miquel Ibáñez Sotos	(Spain) Nil Solans	Ford Fiesta R5	WRC-2	4 minutes late	0:40
SS7	49	(Spain) José Antonio Suárez	(Spain) Cándido Carrera	(Spain) Hyundai Motor España	Hyundai i20 R5	WRC-2	7 minutes late	1:10
SS8	35	(Spain) Nil Solans	(Spain) Miquel Ibáñez Sotos	(Spain) Nil Solans	Ford Fiesta R5	WRC-2	4 minutes late	0:40
SS11	21	(Greece) Jourdan Serderidis	(Belgium) Frédéric Miclotte	(United Kingdom) M-Sport World Rally Team	Ford Fiesta WRC	WRC	1 minute early	1:00
SS15	41	(France) Nicolas Ciamin	(France) Thibault de la Haye	(France) Nicolas Ciamin	Hyundai i20 R5	WRC-2	Stewards decision	0:30
SS16	6	(Spain) Dani Sordo	(Spain) Carlos del Barrio	(South Korea) Hyundai Shell Mobis WRT	Hyundai i20 Coupe WRC	WRC	10 minutes late	1:40

=== Retirements ===
The following notable crews retired from the event. Under Rally2 regulations, they were eligible to re-enter the event starting from the next leg. Crews that re-entered were given an additional time penalty.

Stage	No.	Driver	Co-driver	Entrant	Car	Class	Cause	Re-entry
SS5	82	(Germany) Albert von Thurn und Taxis	(Germany) Klaus Wicha	(Germany) Albert von Thurn und Taxis	Škoda Fabia R5	—N/a	Mechanical	No
SS9	35	(Spain) Nil Solans	(Spain) Miquel Ibáñez Sotos	(Spain) Nil Solans	Ford Fiesta R5	WRC-2	Off road	No
SS9	36	(France) Pierre-Louis Loubet	(France) Vincent Landais	(Italy) BRC Racing Team	Hyundai i20 R5	WRC-2	Mechanical	Yes
SS11	2	(United Kingdom) Elfyn Evans	(United Kingdom) Daniel Barritt	(United Kingdom) M-Sport Ford WRT	Ford Fiesta WRC	WRC	Off road	Yes
SS13	32	(United Kingdom) Gus Greensmith	(United Kingdom) Stuart Loudon	(United Kingdom) Gus Greensmith	Ford Fiesta R5	WRC-2	Driver injury	No
SS13	39	(France) Yoann Bonato	(France) Benjamin Boulloud	(France) CHL Sport Auto	Citroën C3 R5	WRC-2	Mechanical	Yes
SS14	40	(Finland) Jari Huttunen	(Finland) Antti Linnaketo	(South Korea) Hyundai Motorsport	Hyundai i20 R5	WRC-2	Mechanical	Yes
SS14	47	(France) Eric Camilli	(France) Benjamin Veillas	(United Kingdom) M-Sport Ford WRT	Ford Fiesta R5	WRC-2	Timing belt	No
SS16	7	(Finland) Jari-Matti Latvala	(Finland) Miikka Anttila	(Japan) Toyota Gazoo Racing WRT	Toyota Yaris WRC	WRC	Transmission	No
SS16	10	(Norway) Mads Østberg	(Norway) Torstein Eriksen	(France) Citroën Total Abu Dhabi WRT	Citroën C3 WRC	WRC	Off road	No
SS17	6	(Spain) Dani Sordo	(Spain) Carlos del Barrio	(United Kingdom) M-Sport Ford WRT	Hyundai i20 Coupe WRC	WRC	Accident damage	No
SS17	48	(Italy) Umberto Scandola	(Italy) Andrea Gaspari	(Italy) S.A. Motorsport Italia Srl	Škoda Fabia R5	WRC-2	Turbo	No
SS18	61	(France) Jean-Baptiste Franceschi	(France) Romain Courbon	Équipe de France FFSA Rally	Ford Fiesta R2T	—N/a	Differential	No

=== Championship standings after the rally ===
==== Drivers' championships ====
World Rally Championship
	Pos.	Driver	Points
	1	(Belgium) Thierry Neuville	172
	2	(France) Sébastien Ogier	149
	3	(Estonia) Ott Tänak	136
	4	(Finland) Esapekka Lappi	88
1	5	(Norway) Andreas Mikkelsen	65
World Rally Championship-2
	Pos.	Driver	Points
1	1	(Czech Republic) Jan Kopecký	100
1	2	(Sweden) Pontus Tidemand	93
	3	(United Kingdom) Gus Greensmith	55
1	4	(Poland) Łukasz Pieniążek	48
3	5	(Italy) Fabio Andolfi	46
World Rally Championship-3
	Pos.	Driver	Points
	1	(France) Jean-Baptiste Franceschi	79
2	2	(Finland) Taisko Lario	68
1	3	(Sweden) Denis Rådström	62
1	4	(Sweden) Emil Bergkvist	61
	5	(Italy) Enrico Brazzoli	55

==== Co-Drivers' championships ====
World Rally Championship
	Pos.	Co-Driver	Points
	1	(Belgium) Nicolas Gilsoul	172
	2	(France) Julien Ingrassia	149
	3	(Estonia) Martin Järveoja	136
	4	(Finland) Janne Ferm	88
1	5	(Norway) Anders Jæger-Synnevaag	65
World Rally Championship-2
	Pos.	Co-Driver	Points
1	1	(Czech Republic) Pavel Dresler	100
1	2	(Sweden) Jonas Andersson	93
	3	(United Kingdom) Craig Parry	55
1	4	(Poland) Przemysław Mazur	48
1	5	(Norway) Stig Rune Skjærmoen	45
World Rally Championship-3
	Pos.	Co-Driver	Points
	1	(France) Romain Courbon	79
1	2	(Finland) Tatu Hämäläinen	68
1	3	(Sweden) Johan Johansson	62
	4	(Italy) Luca Beltrame	55
	5	(Norway) Ola Fløene	33

==== Manufacturers' and teams' championships ====
World Rally Championship
	Pos.	Manufacturer	Points
	1	(South Korea) Hyundai Shell Mobis WRT	254
1	2	(Japan) Toyota Gazoo Racing WRT	241
1	3	(United Kingdom) M-Sport Ford WRT	224
	4	(France) Citroën Total Abu Dhabi WRT	159
World Rally Championship-2
	Pos.	Team	Points
	1	(Czech Republic) Škoda Motorsport	108
	2	(Czech Republic) Škoda Motorsport II	100
	3	(Finland) Printsport	69
2	4	(Italy) ACI Team Italia WRC	62
	5	(South Korea) Hyundai Motorsport	54
World Rally Championship-3
	Pos.	Team	Points
	1	(Italy) ACI Team Italia	68
	2	(Estonia) OT Racing	62
	3	(Germany) ADAC Sachsen	62
	4	Équipe de France FFSA Rally	55
	5	(Turkey) Castrol Ford Team Turkiye	42

== Notes ==
Previous rally: 2018 Rally Finland	2018 FIA World Rally Championship	Next rally: 2018 Rally Turkey
Previous rally: 2017 Rallye Deutschland	2018 Rally Deutschland	Next rally: 2019 Rallye Deutschland
