= Louise Cook (rally driver) =

British rally driver (born 1987)

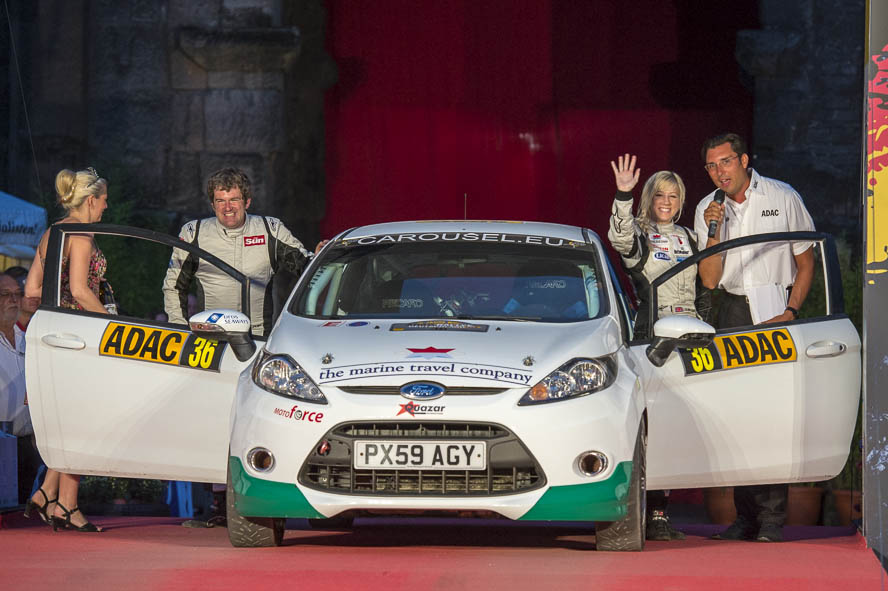
- Cook (right) at the 2012 Rallye Deutschland

Personal information
- Nationality: (United Kingdom) British
- Born: 14 May 1987 (age 39); Maidstone, Kent, England

World Rally Championship record
- Years active: 2012, 2016–present
- Co-driver: Stefan Davis, R. Toer
- Teams: Rally Team GB
- Rallies: 13
- Championships: 0
- Podiums: 0
- Stage wins: 0
- Total points: 0
- First rally: 2012 Monte Carlo Rally
- Last updated on: 11 October 2019.

Louise Cook (born 14 May 1987) is a British rally driver. In 2012, she became the first woman to win the FIA Production Car Cup for Drivers of 2WD. In a career which has seen her struggle to obtain sufficient sponsorship to allow her to participate in rallying events, Cook has also won the British Rally Championship Ladies' title in 2010 and 2011.

== Biography ==
=== Early life and career ===
Cook was born on 14 May 1987 in Maidstone in the English county of Kent. She attributes her taste in rallying to her father Robert who bought her a battery powered vehicle on her sixth birthday. Cook regularly used the car for several hours until its battery died and she occasionally caused property damage to the family home. She studied car design at Coventry University. Cook had her first experience in rally at the age of nineteen while attending a car show and noticed an advertisement to encourage more women into rallying. Although she had no prior rallying experience, the driver entered and came second out of 1000 women. Cook's first rally participation was behind the wheel of a Peugeot 205 in the 2006 Rockingham Stages. Cook was the youngest driver in the race and ranked 51st out of 105 competitors. It was at this rally that she began her partnership with her co-driver Stefan Davis.

Two years later, during an annual trip to Finland to improve her handling technique, she had an accident where she crashed her car against a frozen snow bank over 130 mph (210 km/h) and broke her collarbone and nine ribs. In 2009, Cook decided to formally compete in a rally championship and thus sought sponsors for her plan called Promotion 50, which focused on obtaining the support of 500 sponsors who contributed £50 each. The plan won her the support of 300 companies and together with support from commercial sponsors and her own contributions, Cook was able to secure the budget required to partake in the 2010 British Rally Championship.

To allow herself to commit to rallying, she resigned from her job as a receptionist for Kent County Council in February 2010. Her first season was considered successful by taking four class podium finishes with two of those being victories and was ranked in the top ten standings of the British Rally Championship Challenge. Cook's results led her to winning the C4 class title and the Women's championship. In the following season, she failed to record a podium finish, but come the end of her campaign, she was second in her class rankings. After a closely fought contest at the championship's penultimate round, the Rally Yorkshire, which became the final rally of the season following the cancellation of the Isle of Man Rally. This consequently forced Cook to undertake a last-minute rethink of her strategy. Her results allowed her to retain the Ladies' championship for the second successive year.

=== World Rally Championship career ===
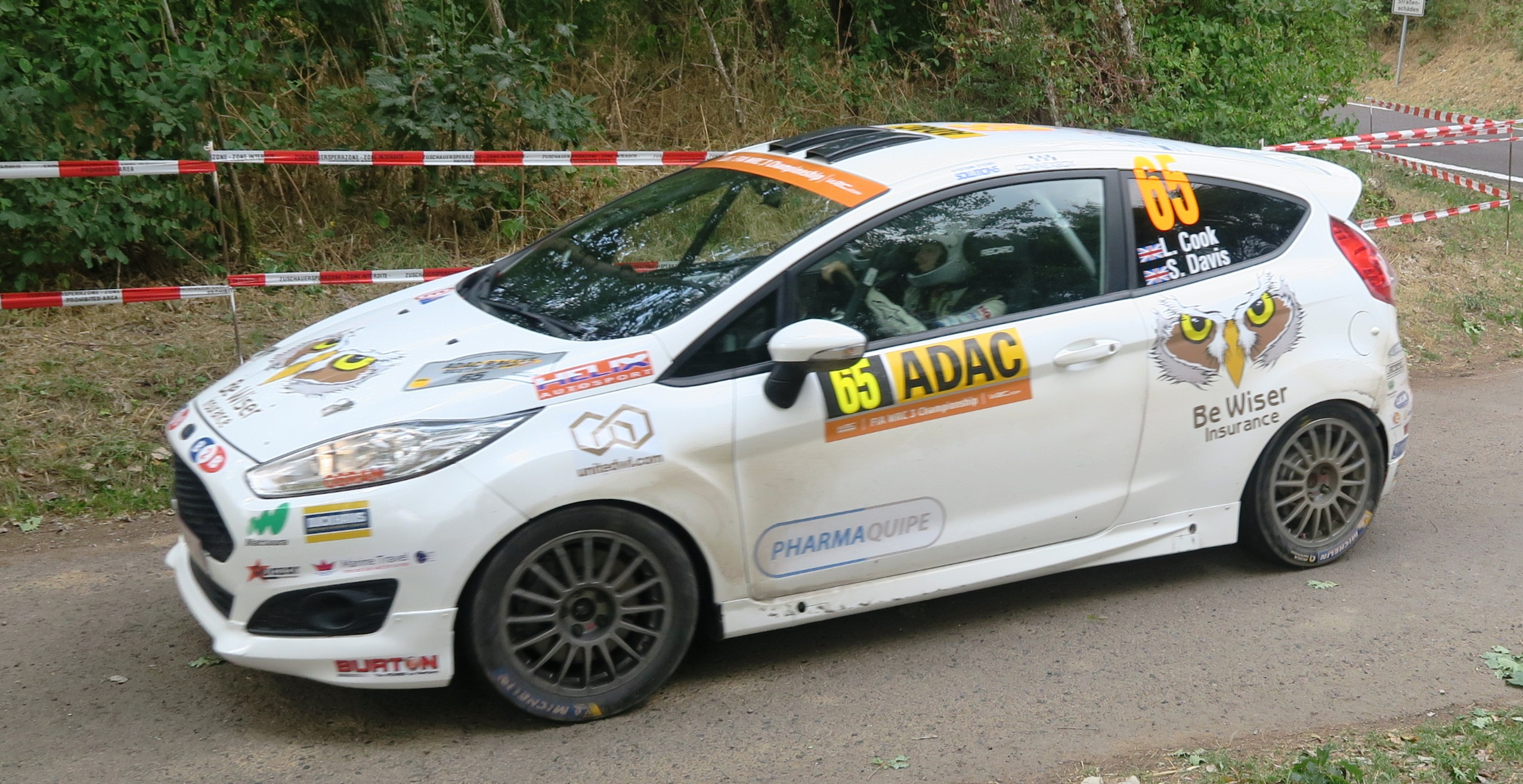
Louise Cook and Stefan Davis in a Ford Fiesta RS for the 2018 Rallye Deutschland

Cook began competing in the World Rally Championship (WRC) in the production class in 2012 and drove a Ford Fiesta ST. One day before the deadline for production entries, her team had not decided on whether they wished to enter but chose to file an entry shortly before it was closed. At the season-opening Monte Carlo Rally, Cook became the first woman to claim a production class podium position by finishing in second place. Her next rally five months later in Greece saw her secure a sixth place production class result despite her car becoming damaged. Cook's funding had dried up before Rally New Zealand and was forced to sell her trophies on eBay to raise £17,000 which enabled her continuation in the championship.

She contracted flu and later a chest infection but still drove cautiously to claim second in the production class. Cook had her first (and only) retirement of the season in the Rallye Deutschland. In the Rally d'Italia Sardegna, her car was affected by multiple problems and fought through pain in her left arm to finish tenth in her class. Cook was diagnosed with a broken collarbone by the Fédération Internationale de l'Automobile's (FIA) medical delegate Jean Duby and was required to withdraw from the season-ending Rally Catalunya. Her results throughout the season made her the first woman to clinch an WRC title with the FIA Production Car Cup for Drivers of 2WD.

In 2014, Cook trained the actor Idris Elba in helping him refine his rallying ability for the BBC documentary Idris Elba: King of Speed. Days before she was due to enter the 2015 Rally d'Italia, a surgical screw from an operation three years previously got stuck in her subclavian artery and obstructed blood flow which led to her being transported to Maidstone Hospital. Cook consequently had her clavicle plate carefully removed but it took her time to get her strength back. It was announced in July 2016 that she had obtained the funding which allowed her to take part in the Rally Finland. Cook survived an intermittent engine misfire caused by a damaged crankshaft sensor and this prompted a mid-rally engine switch. She eventually finished 53rd overall.

Cook turned to crowdfunding and sold more of her trophies to enable her to pay for her entry fees for WRC-3 in 2017 after some of her major sponsors pulled out. She had to retire from Rally Sweden after losing her Ford Fiesta's bumper before the Colin's Crest jump during the second pass over the Vargåsen stage. Cook was able to re-assemble the car, but a homologation problem in the spare seat brackets made her unable to start the final leg of the rally. Although her name was in the entry list for the fourth round of the season, the Tour de Corse, she could not raise the necessary amount of funding to take part in the rally.

Cook entered the 2018 Rally Italia Sardegna as a private entrant in a WRC-3 Peugeot 208 R2 that she hired from Spanish team Mavisa Sport after the Ford Fiesta R2 she intended to drive could not be used because no team manager could be found to enter the car for scrutineering the week before. She prepared for the rally by taking a 30 km (19 mi) test. Cook finished third out of four entrants after problems with seat padding in pre-rally scrutineering was deemed illegal, reducing her visibility. She switched to Team Floral to drive its Ford Fiesta R2T for Rallye Deutschland and received donations from crowdfunding to enter the event. Cook placed third out of four entrants. She followed this with a ninth-place finish in the season's next round, Rally Turkey.

=== YouTube channel ===
Since 24 July 2011, Louise Cook has maintained her own channel on YouTube called "Cookie and Cars", with the majority of videos revolving around sim racing and other car-related content. As of November 2023, the channel has 222K subscribers.

== See also ==
- List of female World Rally Championship drivers
