= Ola Fløene =

Norwegian rally co-driver (born 1969)

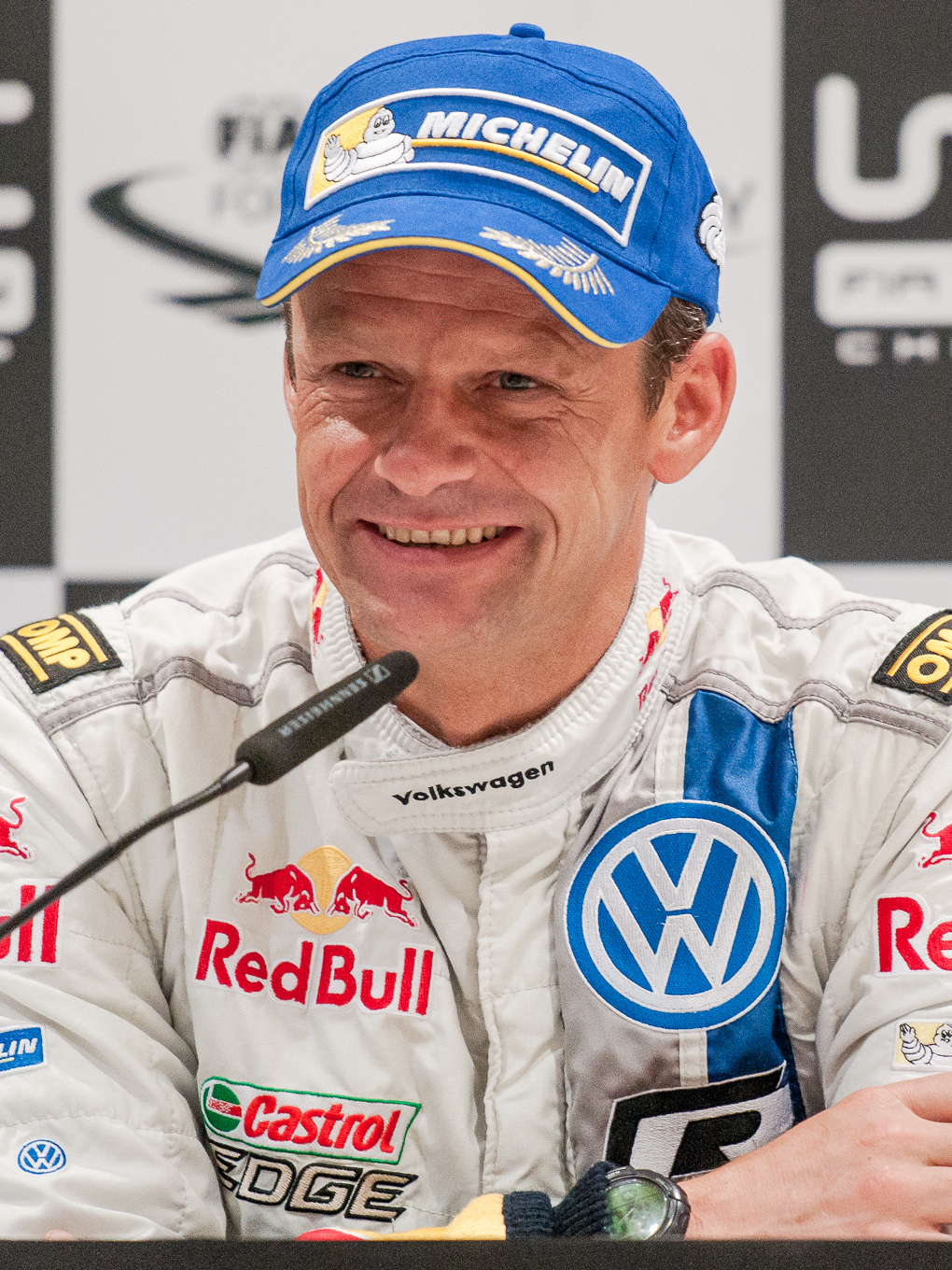
- Ola Fløene at the 2014 Rallye Deutschland

Personal information
- Nationality: Norway
- Born: February 1, 1969 (age 57); Hamar, Norway

World Rally Championship record
- Years active: 1995, 2000–2019, 2021
- Driver: (Norway) John Skar (Norway) Martin Stenshorne (Norway) Henning Solberg (Norway) Bernt Kollevold (Norway) Thomas Kolberg (Austria) David Doppelreiter (Canada) Patrick Richard (Norway) Kristian Kolberg (Sweden) Tobias Johansson (Norway) Andreas Mikkelsen (Sweden) Pontus Tidemand (Norway) Mads Østberg (Sweden) Emil Bergkvist
- Teams: Volkswagen Motorsport, M-Sport
- Rallies: 107
- Championships: 0
- Rally wins: 1
- Podiums: 15
- Stage wins: 37
- First rally: 1995 RAC Rally
- First win: 2015 Rally Catalunya
- Last win: 2015 Rally Catalunya
- Last rally: 2021 Rally Estonia

Ola Fløene (born February 1, 1969) is a Norwegian rally co-driver in the World Rally Championship. He is currently contesting WRC2 alongside long-time colleague Andreas Mikkelsen with Toksport WRT. In the past, Fløene has co-driven with a number of Norwegians and Swedes including Pontus Tidemand, Mads Østberg and Henning Solberg.

== Rally career ==
Fløene's co-driving career began in the 1980s, mainly entering into Norwegian events and occasional WRC and ERC rallies through the 1990s. He gained a great deal of experience of international rallies in the new century, sitting with a number of drivers. Fløene began co-driving with a then 17-years-old Mikkelsen in 2006 on various British events, winning six rallies outright that year including their debut outing together. The partnership lasted for five further seasons beginning with a limited WRC campaign in 2007.

Together, Fløene and Mikkelsen won the Intercontinental Rally Challenge in 2011 and 2012. In 2013, Mikkelsen became a factory driver with Volkswagen Motorsport sitting alongside Finn Mikko Markkula. Fløene meanwhile joined Pontus Tidemand where they became Junior World Rally champions that year.

Fløene's partnership with Mikkelsen restarted as he joined Volkswagen Motorsport himself in 2014, replacing Markkula mid-season. He got his first WRC podium on his second rally at Volkswagen and they both got their first WRC win at the 2015 Rally Catalunya.

In 2016, it was announced Fløene would become Mads Østberg's co-driver at M-Sport whilst Anders Jæger took over from Fløene at Volkswagen. Fløene would reunite with Mikkelsen once again in 2021 to compete in WRC2 with Toksport WRT.

== WRC victories ==
#	Event	Season	Driver	Car
1	(Spain) 51º Rally RACC Catalunya – Costa Daurada	2015	(Norway) Andreas Mikkelsen	Volkswagen Polo R WRC

== Rally results ==
=== WRC results ===
Year	Entrant	Car	1	2	3	4	5	6	7	8	9	10	11	12	13	14	15	16	Pos.	Points
2006	Stobart VK Ford Rally Team	Ford Focus RS WRC 04	MON	SWE	MEX	ESP	FRA	ARG	ITA	GRE	GER	FIN	JPN	CYP	TUR	AUS	NZL	GBR; Ret	NC	0
2007	Stobart VK Ford Rally Team	Ford Focus RS WRC 04	MON	SWE	NOR; 10	MEX	POR; 10												NC	0
2007	Ramsport	Ford Focus RS WRC 04						ARG	ITA	GRE	FIN; 12	GER; 24	NZW	ESP; 25	FRA; DSQ	JPN	IRE; 9		NC	0
2007	Ramsport	Ford Focus RS WRC 06																GBR; Ret	NC	0
2008	Ramsport	Ford Focus RS WRC 06	MON	SWE; 5	MEX	ARG	JOR	ITA; Ret	GRE	TUR; 19	FIN; 12								16th	5
2008	Ramsport	Ford Focus RS WRC 07										GER; 11	NZL	ESP; 8	FRA; 11	JPN	GBR		16th	5
2009	Andreas Mikkelsen	Subaru Impreza WRX STi	IRE	NOR; Ret															NC	0
2009	Andreas Mikkelsen	Škoda Fabia WRC			CYP	POR	ARG	ITA	GRE	POL; Ret	FIN	AUS	ESP	GBR					NC	0
2010	Andreas Mikkelsen	Ford Fiesta S2000	SWE; 11	MEX	JOR	TUR	NZL	POR	BUL	FIN	GER	JPN							26th	1
2010	Andreas Mikkelsen	Škoda Fabia S2000											FRA; 18	ESP					26th	1
2010	Czech Ford National Team	Škoda Fabia S2000													GBR; 10				26th	1
2011	Volkswagen Motorsport	Škoda Fabia S2000	SWE	MEX	POR	JOR	ITA	ARG	GRE	FIN; Ret	GER	AUS	FRA	ESP	GBR				NC	0
2012	Volkswagen Motorsport	Škoda Fabia S2000	MON	SWE; 13	MEX	POR	ARG; Ret	GRE; Ret	NZL	FIN; 27	GER; 7	GBR	FRA; 12	ITA; 7	ESP; 21				14th	13
2013	Pontus Tidemand	Ford Fiesta RS WRC	MON	SWE; Ret	MEX	POR	ARG	GRE	ITA	FIN	GER	AUS	FRA	ESP	GBR				NC	0
2014	Pontus Tidemand	Ford Fiesta RS WRC	MON	SWE; 8	MEX														5th	106
2014	Pontus Tidemand	Ford Fiesta R5				POR; 11	ARG												5th	106
2014	Volkswagen Motorsport II	Volkswagen Polo R WRC						ITA; 4	POL; 2	FIN; 4	GER; 3	AUS; 3	FRA; 2	ESP; 7	GBR; Ret				5th	106
2015	Volkswagen Motorsport II	Volkswagen Polo R WRC	MON; 3	SWE; 3	MEX; 3	ARG; Ret	POR; 3	ITA; 36	POL; 2	FIN; Ret	GER; 3	AUS; 4	FRA; 3	ESP; 1	GBR; 3				3rd	171
2016	M-Sport	Ford Fiesta RS WRC	MON; 4	SWE; 3	MEX; 3	ARG; 5	POR; 7	ITA; Ret	POL; 8	FIN; 6	GER; 6	CHN; C	FRA; 9	ESP; 5	GBR; 8	AUS; 6			7th	102
2017	M-Sport	Ford Fiesta WRC	MON	SWE; 15	MEX	FRA	ARG; 9	POR; 8	ITA; 7	POL; 7	FIN								16th	18
2017	Emil Bergkvist	Citroën DS3 R5										GER; 19	ESP	GBR; Ret	AUS				16th	18
2018	Emil Bergkvist	Ford Fiesta R2T	MON	SWE; 24	MEX	FRA; 22	ARG	POR	ITA	FIN	GER	TUR	GBR	ESP	AUS				NC	0
2019	M-Sport Ford WRT	Ford Fiesta WRC	MON; 20	SWE; 8	MEX	FRA	ARG	CHL	POR	ITA	FIN		TUR; 9	GBR; 7	ESP	AUS; C			14th	12
2019	M-Sport Ford WRT	Ford Fiesta R5 Mk. II										GER; WD							14th	12
2021	Toksport WRT	Škoda Fabia R5 Evo	MON; 7	ARC; 11	CRO; 39	POR; WD	ITA; Ret	KEN; WD	EST; 9	BEL	GRE	FIN	ESP	MNZ					20th	8

Sporting positions
Preceded by Mikko Markkula	Intercontinental Rally Challenge Champion Co-Driver; 2011–2012	Succeeded by Incumbent
Preceded by Phil Pugh	Junior World Rally Champion Co-Driver; 2013	Succeeded by Thomas Dubois
