= Emil Bergkvist =

Swedish rally driver (born 1994)

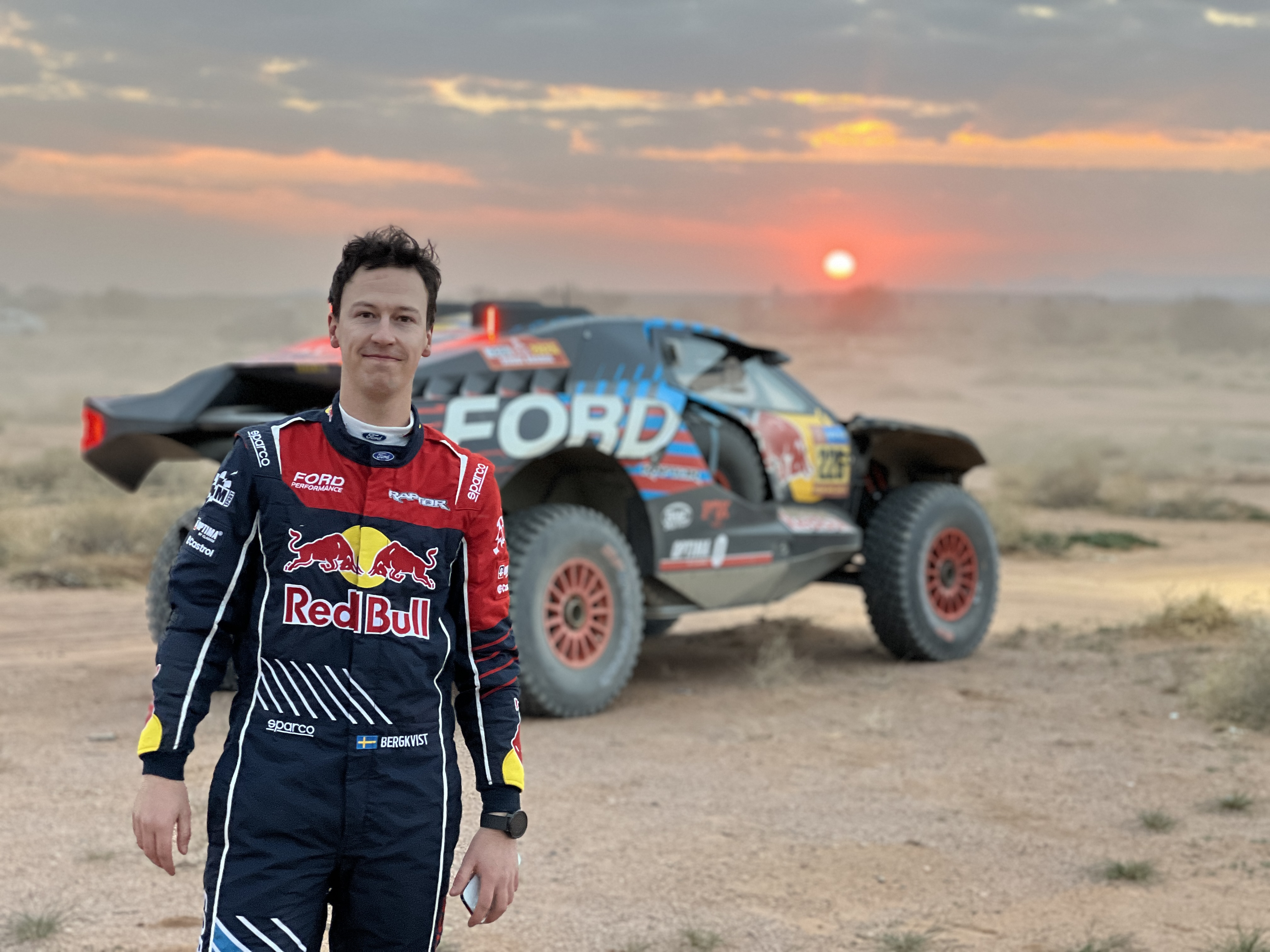
- Bergkvist during Dakar 2025

Personal information
- Nationality: (Sweden) Swedish
- Full name: Emil Olov Bergkvist
- Born: 17 June 1994 (age 32); Sweden

World Rally Championship record
- Years active: 2015–2019 - 2021
- Rallies: 20 (Note: Bergkvist has started 19 rallies as a driver and one as a co-driver.)
- Championships: 0
- Rally wins: 0
- Podiums: 0
- Stage wins: 0
- Total points: 1
- First rally: 2015 Rally Sweden
- Last updated on: 1.3.2021.

Emil Bergkvist

Dakar Rally
- Years active: 2021–present
- Teams: Audi Sport, M-Sport Ford
- Starts: 3
- Wins: 0
- Podiums: 1
- Best finish: 3rd in 2025

Emil Olov Bergkvist (born 17 June 1994) is a Swedish rally driver and co-driver. He drove in the World Rally Championship from 2015 to 201.

Bergkvist is the 2018 Junior World Rally Champion and the 2015 Junior European Rally Champion.

Since 2021, Bergkvist is a rally-raid co-driver for Swedish driver Mattias Ekström at the World Rally-Raid Championship. They comkepted as works crew for Audi from 2022 to 2024. Since 2025, Bergkvist together with Ekström are racing for Ford M-Sport, having finished third at the Dakar Rally in 2025 and 2026.

== Career results ==
=== WRC results ===
==== As driver ====
Year	Entrant	Car	1	2	3	4	5	6	7	8	9	10	11	12	13	14	Pos	Points
2015	Emil Bergkvist	Opel Adam R2	MON	SWE; 32	MEX	ARG	POR	ITA	POL	FIN							NC	0
2015	ADAC Opel Rallye Junior Team	Opel Adam R2									GER; 22	AUS	FRA	ESP	GBR		NC	0
2016	Emil Bergkvist	Citroën DS3 R5	MON	SWE; 17	MEX	ARG	POR; Ret	ITA	POL; Ret	FIN; 51	GER	CHN; C	FRA	ESP	GBR	AUS	NC	0
2017	Emil Bergkvist	Citroën DS3 R5	MON; 17	SWE; 17	MEX	FRA; 32	ARG	POR; Ret	ITA	POL	FIN	GER; 19	ESP	GBR; Ret	AUS		NC	0
2018	Emil Bergkvist	Ford Fiesta R2T	MON	SWE; 24	MEX	FRA; 22	ARG	POR; 34	ITA	FIN; 20	GER	TUR; 17	GBR	ESP	AUS		NC	0
2019	Emil Bergkvist	Ford Fiesta R5	MON	SWE; 14	MEX	FRA	ARG	CHL	POR; 10	ITA; WD	FIN	GER	TUR	GBR	ESP	AUS; C	27th	1

==== As co-driver ====
Year	Entrant	Car	1	2	3	4	5	6	7	8	9	10	11	12	Pos	Points
2021	Mattias Ekström	Škoda Fabia R5 Evo	MON	ARC; 19	CRO	POR	ITA	KEN	EST	BEL	GRE	FIN	ESP	MNZ	NC	0

=== WRC-2 results ===
Year	Entrant	Car	1	2	3	4	5	6	7	8	9	10	11	12	13	14	Pos	Points
2016	Emil Bergkvist	Citroën DS3 R5	MON	SWE; 7	MEX	ARG	POR; Ret	ITA	POL; Ret	FIN; 13	GER	CHN; C	FRA	ESP	GBR	AUS	35th	6
2017	Emil Bergkvist	Citroën DS3 R5	MON; 6	SWE; 6	MEX	FRA; 9	ARG	POR; Ret	ITA	POL	FIN	GER; 10	ESP	GBR; Ret	AUS		17th	19
2019	Emil Bergkvist	Ford Fiesta R5	MON	SWE; 4	MEX	FRA	ARG	CHL	POR; 2	ITA; WD	FIN	GER	TUR	GBR	ESP	AUS; C	15th	30

=== WRC-3 results ===
==== As driver ====
Year	Entrant	Car	1	2	3	4	5	6	7	8	9	10	11	12	13	Pos.	Points
2018	Emil Bergkvist	Ford Fiesta R2T	MON	SWE; 2	MEX	FRA; 3	ARG	POR; 5	ITA	FIN; 2	GER	TUR; 1	GBR	ESP	AUS	3rd	86

==== As co-driver ====
Year	Entrant	Car	1	2	3	4	5	6	7	8	9	10	11	12	Pos.	Points
2021	Mattias Ekström	Škoda Fabia R5 Evo	MON	ARC; 5	CRO	POR	ITA	KEN	EST	BEL	GRE	FIN	ESP	MNZ	36th	12

=== JWRC results ===
Year	Entrant	Car	1	2	3	4	5	Pos	Points
2018	Emil Bergkvist	Ford Fiesta R2T	SWE; 2	FRA; 3	POR; 5	FIN; 2	TUR; 1	1st	138

=== ERC results ===
Year	Entrant	Car	1	2	3	4	5	6	7	8	9	10	Pos.	Points
2015	ADAC Opel Rallye Junior Team	Opel Adam R2	JÄN	LIE; 7	IRE; 10	AZO; 19	YPR; Ret	EST; 11	CZE; 16	CYP	GRE		11th	32
2015	Saintéloc Junior Team	Peugeot 208 T16 R5										VAL; 4	11th	32

=== ERC Junior results ===
Year	Entrant	Car	1	2	3	4	5	6	Pos.	Points
2015	ADAC Opel Rallye Junior Team	Opel Adam R2	LIE; 1	IRE; 1	AZO; 4	YPR; Ret	EST; 2	CZE; 1	1st	147

=== Dakar Rally results ===
Year	Class	Vehicle	Position	Stages won
2021	Light Prototype	(Japan) Yamaha	DNF	0
2022	Car	(Germany) Audi	9th	1
2023	Car	(Germany) Audi	14th	1
2024	Car	(Germany) Audi	26th	2
2025	Car	(United States) Ford	3rd	1
2026	Car	(United States) Ford	3rd	3
