= Automobile Club d'Italia =

Not-for-profit statutory corporation of the Italian Republic

The Automobile Club d'Italia (ACI) is a not-for-profit statutory corporation of the Italian Republic.

== History ==
The club originated through the efforts of Count Carlo Biscaretti di Ruffia as the "Automobile Club of Turin" founded in Turin on 6 December 1898. It first became a national association in 1905 when it joined together with other local automotive clubs. In 1927 the corporate body was formed by royal decree, with the task of promoting and regulating the car sector and to represent car owners' interests in the country.

The corporation was called the Reale Automobile Club d'Italia (RACI; "Royal Automobile Club of Italy") until 1946, when the monarchy was abolished, and it dropped the royal appellation.

In 2014 the Italian parliament attempted to end official financial support for the ACI, by eliminating the "public automobile register" (PRA) fees administered by the ACI, and merging the functions into the Motorizzazione (motor vehicle agency under the Ministry of Infrastructure and Transport). The ACI successfully avoided its dissolution.

== Competition oversight ==
The Commissione Sportiva Automobilistica Italiana (CSAI) was the internal commission of the ACI that regulated Italian autosports competitions, in conjunction with CONI and the Commission Sportive Internationale (CSI) of Fédération Internationale de l'Automobile (FIA). In 1993 CSI (then known as FISA) was reintegrated into FIA; similarly in 2012 CSAI was reintegrated into ACI.

Races are now regulated under the FIA and ACI cognomen "ACI Sport".
