= 2018 Rally Catalunya =

Motor rally competition

2018 Rally Catalunya: 54. RallyRACC Catalunya-Costa Daurada
Round 12 of 13 in the 2018 World Rally Championship
| ← Previous event | Next event → |
- Host country: Spain
- Rally base: Salou, Tarragona
- Dates run: 25 – 28 October 2018
- Start location: Montjuïc, Barcelona
- Finish location: Salou, Tarragona
- Stages: 18 (331.58 km; 206.03 miles)
- Stage surface: Tarmac and gravel
- Transport distance: 1,132.79 km (703.88 miles)
- Overall distance: 1,464.37 km (909.92 miles)

Statistics
- Crews registered: 76
- Crews: 70 at start, 53 at finish

Overall results
- Overall winner: (France) Sébastien Loeb (Monaco) Daniel Elena (France) Citroën Total Abu Dhabi WRT; 3:12:08.0
- Power Stage winner: (Estonia) Ott Tänak (Estonia) Martin Järveoja (Japan) Toyota Gazoo Racing WRT

Support category results
- WRC-2 winner: (Finland) Kalle Rovanperä (Finland) Jonne Halttunen (Czech Republic) Škoda Motorsport II; 3:20:47.6
- WRC-3 winner: (Italy) Enrico Brazzoli (Italy) Luca Beltrame (Italy) Enrico Brazzoli; 3:58:18.3

The 2018 Rally Catalunya (formally known as the 54. RallyRACC Catalunya-Costa Daurada) was a motor racing event for rally cars that took place between 25 and 28 October, based in Salou, Tarragona, Spain. The event was open to entries competing in World Rally Cars and cars complying with Group R regulations. It marked the fifty-fourth running of Rally Catalunya and was the twelfth round of the 2018 FIA World Rally Championship, the highest class of competition in international rallying. Seventy-six crews, including manufacturer teams and privateers, were entered to compete in the World Rally Championship, the FIA World Rally Championship-2 and FIA World Rally Championship-3 support series and the Spanish national Rally Championship and Peugeot Rally Cup Ibérica championship. (Note: Only the first leg of the rally counts towards the Peugeot Rally Cup Ibérica championship.)

The 2018 event consisted of eighteen special stages, with a total competitive distance of a 331.58 km (206.03 miles) and an additional 1,132.79 km (703.88 miles) in transport stages.

Kris Meeke and Paul Nagle were the reigning rally winners, but did not defend their win after Meeke was fired from Citroën. The Finnish crew of Teemu Suninen and Mikko Markkula were the reigning winners of the World Rally Championship-2, but did not defend their title as they will compete in the World Rally Championship class. Nil Solans and Miquel Ibáñez Sotos were the reigning World Rally Championship-3 winners, but Marc Martí replaced Ibáñez Sotos as Solans' co-driver in the WRC-2 category.

Nine-time world champions Sébastien Loeb and Daniel Elena won a rally for the first time since 2013 Rally Argentina. The victory also marked Loeb the third oldest winner overall. The margin between second-place Sébastien Ogier was 2.9 seconds, which also made the rally become the tenth closest wins in history. The Škoda Motorsport II crew of Kalle Rovanperä and Jonne Halttunen won in the World Rally Championship-2 in a Škoda Fabia R5, while the Italian crew of Enrico Brazzoli and Luca Beltrame won in the World Rally Championship-3. The Czech crew of Jan Kopecký and Pavel Dresler finished second in WRC-2, which made them the drivers' and co-drivers' champions of 2018 World Rally Championship-2 respectively.

== Background ==
=== Championship standings prior to the event ===
Thierry Neuville and Nicolas Gilsoul entered the round as the leaders of the World Rally Championship for Drivers and the World Rally Championship for Co-Drivers respectively. They held a seven-point lead over defending World Champions Sébastien Ogier and Julien Ingrassia. Ott Tänak and Martin Järveoja were third, a further fourteen points behind. In the World Rally Championship for Manufacturers, Toyota Gazoo Racing WRT held a twenty-point lead over Hyundai Shell Mobis WRT.

In the World Rally Championship-2 standings, Jan Kopecký and Pavel Dresler led the drivers' and co-drivers' standings by fourteen points. Pontus Tidemand and Jonas Andersson were in second place, but they did not contest the rally. Tidemand was forty-one points ahead of privateers Gus Greensmith in the drivers' standings, while Andersson held a forty-six points lead over Jonne Halttunen in the co-drivers' standings. Škoda Motorsport II held a forty-twenty-point lead over sister team Škoda Motorsport in the teams' championship.

Junior World Rally Champion Emil Bergkvist led the World Rally Championship-3 drivers' standings, three points cleared of Taisko Lario. Denis Rådström was another three points behind in third. In the World Rally Championship-3 co-drivers' standings, Tatu Hämäläinen led Johan Johansson by three points, while Romain Courbon was slender one point further behind. In the teams' championship, ACI Team Italia led Castrol Ford Team Turkiye by sixteen points.

=== Entry list ===
The following crews were entered into the rally. The entry list consisted of seventy-six crews, including thirteen World Rally Car entries, twenty-one entries in the World Rally Championship-2 and four in the World Rally Championship-3.

| No. | Entrant | Driver | Co-Driver | Car | Group | Eligibility (Note: Competitors competing in national events are variously eligible to score points in the N5 RMC Cup and Beca Júnior R2 RFEdA championships.) | Tyre |
|---|---|---|---|---|---|---|---|
| 1 | (United Kingdom) M-Sport Ford WRT | (France) Sébastien Ogier | (France) Julien Ingrassia | Ford Fiesta WRC | RC1 | WRC manufacturer | M |
| 2 | (United Kingdom) M-Sport Ford WRT | (United Kingdom) Elfyn Evans | (United Kingdom) Daniel Barritt | Ford Fiesta WRC | RC1 | WRC manufacturer | M |
| 3 | (United Kingdom) M-Sport Ford WRT | (Finland) Teemu Suninen | (Finland) Mikko Markkula | Ford Fiesta WRC | RC1 | WRC manufacturer | M |
| 4 | (South Korea) Hyundai Shell Mobis WRT | (Norway) Andreas Mikkelsen | (Norway) Anders Jæger-Synnevaag | Hyundai i20 Coupe WRC | RC1 | WRC manufacturer | M |
| 5 | (South Korea) Hyundai Shell Mobis WRT | (Belgium) Thierry Neuville | (Belgium) Nicolas Gilsoul | Hyundai i20 Coupe WRC | RC1 | WRC manufacturer | M |
| 6 | (South Korea) Hyundai Shell Mobis WRT | (Spain) Dani Sordo | (Spain) Carlos del Barrio | Hyundai i20 Coupe WRC | RC1 | WRC manufacturer | M |
| 7 | (Japan) Toyota Gazoo Racing WRT | (Finland) Jari-Matti Latvala | (Finland) Miikka Anttila | Toyota Yaris WRC | RC1 | WRC manufacturer | M |
| 8 | (Japan) Toyota Gazoo Racing WRT | (Estonia) Ott Tänak | (Estonia) Martin Järveoja | Toyota Yaris WRC | RC1 | WRC manufacturer | M |
| 9 | (Japan) Toyota Gazoo Racing WRT | (Finland) Esapekka Lappi | (Finland) Janne Ferm | Toyota Yaris WRC | RC1 | WRC manufacturer | M |
| 10 | (France) Citroën Total Abu Dhabi WRT | (France) Sébastien Loeb | (Monaco) Daniel Elena | Citroën C3 WRC | RC1 | WRC manufacturer | M |
| 11 | (France) Citroën Total Abu Dhabi WRT | (Republic of Ireland) Craig Breen | (United Kingdom) Scott Martin | Citroën C3 WRC | RC1 | WRC manufacturer | M |
| 12 | (France) Citroën Total Abu Dhabi WRT | (United Arab Emirates) Khalid Al-Qassimi | (United Kingdom) Chris Patterson | Citroën C3 WRC | RC1 | WRC manufacturer | M |
| 31 | (Czech Republic) Škoda Motorsport II | (Czech Republic) Jan Kopecký | (Czech Republic) Pavel Dresler | Škoda Fabia R5 | RC2 | WRC-2 | M |
| 32 | (Czech Republic) Škoda Motorsport II | (Finland) Kalle Rovanperä | (Finland) Jonne Halttunen | Škoda Fabia R5 | RC2 | WRC-2 | M |
| 33 | (Finland) Printsport | (Poland) Łukasz Pieniążek | (Poland) Przemysław Mazur | Škoda Fabia R5 | RC2 | WRC-2 | M |
| 34 | (Italy) ACI Team Italia WRC | (Italy) Fabio Andolfi | (Italy) Simone Scattolin | Škoda Fabia R5 | RC2 | WRC-2 | P |
| 35 | (South Korea) Hyundai Motorsport | (Finland) Jari Huttunen | (Finland) Antti Linnaketo | Hyundai i20 R5 | RC2 | WRC-2 | M |
| 36 | (France) Citroën Total Rallye Team | (Norway) Ole Christian Veiby | (Norway) Stig Rune Skjærmoen | Citroën C3 R5 | RC2 | WRC-2 | M |
| 37 | (France) Citroën Total Rallye Team | (France) Stéphane Lefebvre | (France) Gabin Moreau | Citroën C3 R5 | RC2 | WRC-2 | M |
| 38 | (Italy) BRC Racing Team | (France) Pierre-Louis Loubet | (France) Vincent Landais | Hyundai i20 R5 | RC2 | WRC-2 | M |
| 39 | (Finland) Tommi Mäkinen Racing | (Japan) Takamoto Katsuta | (Finland) Marko Salminen | Ford Fiesta R5 | RC2 | WRC-2 | M |
| 40 | (Poland) Lotos Rally Team | (Poland) Kajetan Kajetanowicz | (Poland) Maciej Szczepaniak | Ford Fiesta R5 | RC2 | WRC-2 | P |
| 41 | (Romania) Simone Tempestini | (Romania) Simone Tempestini | (Romania) Sergio Itu | Citroën C3 R5 | RC2 | WRC-2 | M |
| 42 | (Italy) Motorsport Italia | (Mexico) Benito Guerra | (Spain) Borja Rozada | Škoda Fabia R5 | RC2 | WRC-2 | P |
| 43 | (United States) Hoonigan Racing Division | (United States) Ken Block | (United States) Alex Gelsomino | Ford Fiesta WRC | RC1 | WRC | M |
| 44 | (Spain) Nil Solans | (Spain) Nil Solans | (Spain) Marc Martí | Ford Fiesta R5 | RC2 | WRC-2 | P |
| 45 | (Turkey) Toksport WRT | (United Kingdom) Chris Ingram | (United Kingdom) Ross Whittock | Škoda Fabia R5 | RC2 | WRC-2 | M |
| 46 | (Bolivia) Marco Bulacia Wilkinson | (Bolivia) Marco Bulacia Wilkinson | (Argentina) Fernando Mussano | Ford Fiesta R5 | RC2 | WRC-2 | D |
| 47 | (Germany) Volkswagen Motorsport | (France) Eric Camilli | (France) Benjamin Veillas | Volkswagen Polo GTI R5 | RC2 | WRC-2 | M |
| 48 | (Spain) José Antonio Suárez | (Spain) José Antonio Suárez | (Spain) Cándido Carrera | Hyundai i20 R5 | RC2 | WRC-2 | M |
| 49 | (Germany) Volkswagen Motorsport | (Norway) Petter Solberg | (Norway) Veronica Gulbæk Engan | Volkswagen Polo GTI R5 | RC2 | WRC-2 | M |
| 50 | (Turkey) Toksport WRT | (Norway) Henning Solberg | (Austria) Ilka Minor-Petrasko | Škoda Fabia R5 | RC2 | WRC-2 | M |
| 51 | (France) Michel Sylvain | (France) Michel Sylvain | (France) Anthony Gorguilo | Škoda Fabia R5 | RC2 | WRC-2 | M |
| 52 | (Spain) Sports & you | (Spain) Jose Maria López | (Spain) Borja Rozada | Citroën C3 R5 | RC2 | WRC-2 | M |
| 61 | (Finland) Taisko Lario | (Finland) Taisko Lario | (Finland) Tatu Hämäläinen | Peugeot 208 R2 | RC4 | WRC-3 | P |
| 62 | (Italy) Enrico Brazzoli | (Italy) Enrico Brazzoli | (Italy) Luca Beltrame | Peugeot 208 R2 | RC4 | WRC-3 | P |
| 63 | (United Kingdom) Louise Cook | (United Kingdom) Louise Cook | (United Kingdom) Stefan Davis | Ford Fiesta R2 | RC4 | WRC-3 | M |
| 64 | (Belgium) Amaury Molle | (Belgium) Amaury Molle | (Belgium) Renaud Herman | Peugeot 208 R2 | RC4 | WRC-3 | M |
| 81 | (Spain) Escudería Osona | (Spain) Albert Orriols | (Spain) Lluis Pujolar | Škoda Fabia R5 | RC2 | —N/a | P |
| 82 | (United Kingdom) Rhys Yates | (United Kingdom) Rhys Yates | (United Kingdom) Elliott Edmondson | Škoda Fabia R5 | RC2 | —N/a | M |
| 83 | (France) Jean-Michel Raoux | (France) Jean-Michel Raoux | (France) Laurent Magat | Citroën DS3 WRC | RC1 | —N/a | M |
| 84 | (Republic of Ireland) Eamonn Boland | (Republic of Ireland) Eamonn Boland | (Republic of Ireland) Michael Joseph Morrissey | Ford Fiesta R2 | RC2 | —N/a | M |
| 85 | (Italy) Fabrizio Arengi Bentivoglio | (Italy) Fabrizio Arengi Bentivoglio | (Italy) Fabio Salis | Peugeot 208 T16 R5 | RC2 | —N/a | D |
| 86 | (Netherlands) Henk Bakkenes | (Netherlands) Henk Bakkenes | (Belgium) Cindy Verbaeten | Mitsubishi Lancer Evo X | RC2 | —N/a | P |
| 87 | (Spain) Zamudio Racing Elkartea | (Spain) Efrén Llarena | (Spain) Sara Fernández | Peugeot 308 N5 | N5 | National | M |
| 88 | (Spain) Renault Sport España | (Spain) Fran Cima Artime | (Spain) Diego Sanjuan | Renault Clio N5 | N5 | National | M |
| 89 | (Spain) RMC Motorsport | (Spain) Roberto Rozada | (Spain) Yeray Mújica | Ford Fiesta N5 | N5 | National | M |
| 90 | (Spain) Zamudio Racing Elkartea | (Spain) Mariano Parés Carrió | (Spain) Pere Requena Palomares | Ford Fiesta N5 | N5 | National | M |
| 91 | (Austria) Michael Kogler | (Austria) Michael Kogler | (Germany) André Kachel | Citroën DS3 R3T | RC3 | —N/a | P |
| 92 | Équipe de France FFSA Rally | (France) Jean-Baptiste Franceschi | (France) Romain Courbon | Ford Fiesta R2T | RC4 | —N/a | M |
| 93 | (United Kingdom) Tom Williams | (United Kingdom) Tom Williams | (United Kingdom) Phil Hall | Ford Fiesta R2T | RC4 | —N/a | P |
| 94 | (Spain) Escudería Motor Terrassa | (Spain) Jan Solans | (Spain) Mauro Barreiro | Peugeot 208 R2 | RC4 | National, Peugeot Rally Cup | P |
| 95 | (Spain) RACC Motorsport | (Spain) Josep Bassas Mas | (Spain) Manel Muñoz | Peugeot 208 R2 | RC4 | National, Peugeot Rally Cup | P |
| 96 | (Spain) Escudería A. Ferrol | (Spain) José Maria Reyes González | (Spain) José Antonio Vázquez Barrán | Peugeot 208 R2 | RC4 | National, Peugeot Rally Cup | P |
| 97 | (Spain) Gamace MC Competición | (Spain) Roberto Blach Jr. | (Spain) José Murado | Peugeot 208 R2 | RC4 | National, Peugeot Rally Cup | P |
| 98 | (Spain) Escudería Berberecho | (Spain) Álvaro Pérez Abeijon | (Spain) Brais Mirón | Peugeot 208 R2 | RC4 | National, Peugeot Rally Cup | P |
| 99 | (Spain) Escudería Drago Rallye | (Spain) Julio Martínez Cazorla | (Spain) Diego Corta | Ford Fiesta R2 | RC4 | National | P |
| 100 | (Portugal) MCoutinho Racing | (Portugal) Diogo Gago | (Portugal) Miguel Ramalho | Peugeot 208 R2 | RC4 | Peugeot Rally Cup | P |
| 101 | (Portugal) Hugo Lopes | (Portugal) Hugo Lopes | (Portugal) Nuno Mota Ribeiro | Peugeot 208 R2 | RC4 | Peugeot Rally Cup | P |
| 102 | (Portugal) Pedro Antunes | (Portugal) Pedro Antunes | (Portugal) Paulo Lopes | Peugeot 208 R2 | RC4 | Peugeot Rally Cup | P |
| 103 | (Portugal) Ricardo Sousa | (Portugal) Ricardo Sousa | (Portugal) Luís Marques | Peugeot 208 R2 | RC4 | Peugeot Rally Cup | P |
| 104 | (Spain) Escudería Aterura | (Spain) Iván Medina Herrera | (Spain) Ariday Bonilla | Peugeot 208 R2 | RC4 | Peugeot Rally Cup | P |
| 105 | (Spain) FMC-UCAV Racing Engineering | (Spain) Alberto San Segundo | (Spain) Juan Luis García | Peugeot 208 R2 | RC4 | Peugeot Rally Cup | P |
| 106 | (Portugal) Paulo Moreira | (Portugal) Paulo Moreira | (Portugal) Marco Macedo | Peugeot 208 R2 | RC4 | Peugeot Rally Cup | P |
| 107 | (United Kingdom) Nabila Tejpar | (United Kingdom) Nabila Tejpar | (United Kingdom) Max Freeman | Peugeot 208 R2 | RC4 | Peugeot Rally Cup | P |
| 108 | (Argentina) Luciano Bonomi | (Argentina) Luciano Bonomi | (Argentina) Laureano Grigera | Peugeot 208 R2 | RC4 | Peugeot Rally Cup | M |
| 109 | (Spain) Gamace MC Competición | (Spain) Oriol Gómez Marco | (Spain) Axel Coronado Jiménez | Peugeot 208 R2 | RC4 | Peugeot Rally Cup | P |
| 110 | (Spain) GC Motorsport | (Spain) Abel Torrelles | (Spain) Xavier Carulla | Peugeot 208 R2 | RC4 | Peugeot Rally Cup | P |
| 111 | (Spain) Escudería Motor Terrassa | (Spain) Miquel Labarias Cortés | (Spain) Cristian Muñoz Guil | Peugeot 208 R2 | RC4 | —N/a | M |
| 112 | (Spain) GC Motorsport | (Spain) Alberto Cotano | (Spain) Andreu Pascual | Peugeot 208 R2 | RC4 | —N/a | M |
| 113 | (Spain) C.D. El Mentidero Racing Tías | (Spain) Alexis Romero Hernández | (Spain) Martín Domínguez Cedrés | Peugeot 208 R2 | RC4 | —N/a | M |
| 114 | (France) Luc Gellusseau | (France) Luc Gellusseau | (France) Charles-Antoine De Joux | Peugeot 208 R2 | RC4 | —N/a | M |
| 115 | (France) Philippe Gomez | (France) Philippe Gomez | (France) Gilles Combe | Peugeot 208 R2 | RC4 | —N/a | M |
| 116 | (Italy) Carlo Covi | (Italy) Carlo Covi | (Italy) Simone Angi | Peugeot 208 R2 | RC4 | —N/a | P |
| 117 | (Italy) Paolo Raviglione | (Italy) Paolo Raviglione | (Italy) Marco Demontis | Ford Fiesta R2T | RC4 | —N/a | P |
| 118 | (Spain) Motor Club Sabadell | (Spain) Anna Tallada Bayot | (Spain) Laura Camps Trabal | Ford Fiesta R2T | RC4 | —N/a | M |

=== Itinerary ===
| Date | No. | Stage name | Stage surface | Distance | Time span | Location |
|---|---|---|---|---|---|---|
| 25 October | | Service park – PortAventura | — | — | — | Salou, Tarragona |
| 25 October | | Refuel – PortAventura | — | — | — | Salou, Tarragona |
| 25 October | — | Salou [Shakedown] | Tarmac and gravel | 2.97 km | After 08:00 | Salou, Tarragona |
| 25 October | | Service park – PortAventura | — | — | — | Salou, Tarragona |
| 25 October | — | Ceremonial start – Podium Salou | — | — | 13:15 - 15:15 | Salou, Tarragona |
| 25 October | | Regroup – Barcelona | — | — | 15:15 - 18:05 | Montjuïc, Barcelona |
| 25 October | Leg 1 — Terra Alta — 144.88 km | | | | | |
| 25 October | SS1 | Barcelona | Tarmac | 3.20 km | After 18:08 | Montjuïc, Barcelona |
| 25 October | | Parking – PortAventura | — | — | After 20:08 | Salou, Tarragona |
| 26 October | | Service park – Service park PortAventura | — | — | 08:00 - 08:15 | Salou, Tarragona |
| 26 October | | Refuel – PortAventura | — | — | — | Salou, Tarragona |
| 26 October | SS2 | Gandesa 1 | Gravel | 7.00 km | After 09:33 | Gandesa, Terra Alta |
| 26 October | SS3 | Pesells 1 | Gravel | 26.59 km | After 10:06 | Bot, Terra Alta |
| 26 October | | Remote refuel – Restaurant Coll del Moro | — | — | — | Bot, Terra Alta |
| 26 October | SS4 | La Fatarella - Vilalba 1 | Gravel | 38.85 km | After 11:20 | La Fatarella, Terra Alta |
| 26 October | | Regroup and Technical Zone | — | — | 13:15 - 13:35 | |
| 26 October | | Service park – Service park PortAventura | — | — | 13:35 - 14:05 | Salou, Tarragona |
| 26 October | | Refuel – PortAventura | — | — | — | Salou, Tarragona |
| 26 October | SS5 | Gandesa 2 | Gravel | 7.00 km | After 15:23 | Gandesa, Terra Alta |
| 26 October | SS6 | Pesells 2 | Gravel | 26.59 km | After 15:56 | Bot, Terra Alta |
| 26 October | | Remote refuel – Restaurant Coll del Moro | — | — | — | Bot, Terra Alta |
| 26 October | SS7 | La Fatarella - Vilalba 2 | Gravel | 38.85 km | After 17:10 | La Fatarella, Terra Alta |
| 26 October | | Flexiservice– Service park PortAventura | — | — | After 19:20 | Salou, Tarragona |
| 26 October | | Parking – PortAventura | — | — | Before 23:59 (Note: The time limitation is for all classified cars, excluding re-starting crews.) | Salou, Tarragona |
| 27 October | Leg 2 — Conca de Barberà and Tarragona — 121.80 km | | | | | |
| 27 October | | Service park – Service park PortAventura | — | — | 06:45 - 07:00 | Salou, Tarragona |
| 27 October | | Refuel – PortAventura | — | — | — | Salou, Tarragona |
| 27 October | SS8 | Savallà 1 | Tarmac | 14.12 km | After 08:23 | Savallà del Comtat, Conca de Barberà |
| 27 October | | Remote refuel – Santa Coloma de Queralt | — | — | — | Santa Coloma de Queralt, Conca de Barberà |
| 27 October | SS9 | Querol 1 | Tarmac | 21.26 km | After 09:08 | Querol, Conca de Barberà |
| 27 October | SS10 | El Montmell 1 | Tarmac | 24.40 km | After 10:08 | El Montmell, Conca de Barberà |
| 27 October | | Regroup and Technical Zone – PortAventura | — | — | 11:33 - 11:43 | Salou, Tarragona |
| 27 October | | Service park – Service park PortAventura | — | — | 11:43 - 12:13 | Salou, Tarragona |
| 27 October | | Refuel – PortAventura | — | — | — | Salou, Tarragona |
| 27 October | SS11 | Savallà 2 | Tarmac | 14.12 km | After 13:28 | Savallà del Comtat, Conca de Barberà |
| 27 October | | Remote refuel – Santa Coloma de Queralt | — | — | — | Santa Coloma de Queralt, Conca de Barberà |
| 27 October | SS12 | Querol 2 | Tarmac | 21.26 km | After 14:10 | Querol, Conca de Barberà |
| 27 October | SS13 | El Montmell 2 | Tarmac | 24.40 km | After 15:08 | El Montmell, Conca de Barberà |
| 27 October | | Regroup – Salou | — | — | 16:42 - 16:57 | Salou, Tarragona |
| 27 October | SS14 | Salou | Tarmac | 2.24 km | After 17:00 | Salou, Tarragona |
| 27 October | | Flexiservice– Service park PortAventura | — | — | After 17:30 | Salou, Tarragona |
| 27 October | | Parking – PortAventura | — | — | Before 21:30 | Salou, Tarragona |
| 28 October | Leg 3 — Tarragona — 61.70 km | | | | | |
| 28 October | | Service park – Service park PortAventura | — | — | 06:45 - 07:00 | Salou, Tarragona |
| 28 October | | Refuel – PortAventura | — | — | — | Salou, Tarragona |
| 28 October | SS15 | Riudecanyes 1 | Tarmac | 16.35 km | After 07:35 | Riudecanyes, Tarragona |
| 28 October | | Regroup – Mont-roig del Camp | — | — | 08:06 - 08:16 | Salou, Tarragona |
| 28 October | SS16 | Santa Marina 1 | Tarmac | 14.50 km | After 08:38 | Riudecanyes, Tarragona |
| 28 October | | Regroup and Technical Zone – PortAventura | — | — | 09:35 - 09:45 | Salou, Tarragona |
| 28 October | | Service park – Service park PortAventura | — | — | 09:45 - 10:15 | Salou, Tarragona |
| 28 October | | Refuel – PortAventura | — | — | — | Salou, Tarragona |
| 28 October | SS17 | Riudecanyes 2 | Tarmac | 16.35 km | After 10:50 | Riudecanyes, Tarragona |
| 28 October | | Regroup – Mont-roig del Camp | — | — | 08:06 - 08:16 | Salou, Tarragona |
| 28 October | SS18 | Santa Marina 2 [Power Stage] | Tarmac | 14.50 km | After 12:18 | Riudecanyes, Tarragona |
| 28 October | | Service park – Service park PortAventura | — | — | 13:41 - 13:51 | Salou, Tarragona |
| 28 October | | Ceremonial finish – Podium Salou | — | — | After 14:51 | Salou, Tarragona |

== Report ==
=== Pre-event ===
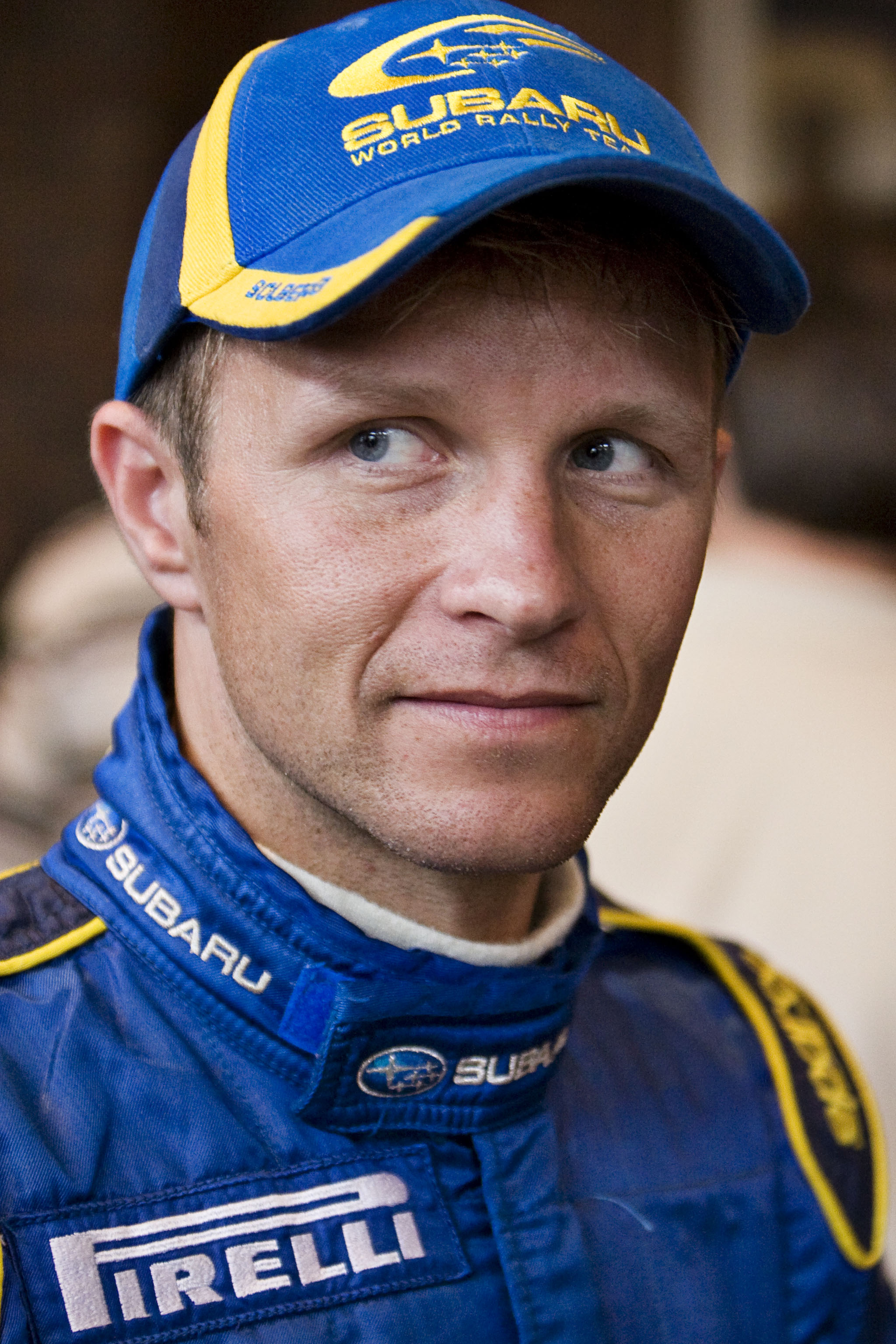
2003 World Drivers' Champion Petter Solberg participated in World Rally Championship-2 category with a Volkswagen Polo GTI.

The rally marked Volkswagen's return to the World Championship with a factory-supported team after the company withdrew from the category in 2016. Volkswagen Motorsport will enter two Volkswagen Polo GTIs built to Group R5 specifications in the World Rally Championship-2 support series. They will be driven by 2003 World Drivers' Champion Petter Solberg and M-Sport regular Eric Camilli.

=== Leg 1 ===
Ott Tänak showed his speed once again in Spain. He pulled away from everyone except his teammate Jari-Matti Latvala, who set three fastest stage times during the day. However, an unexpected puncture cost the Finn around fifty seconds, leaving him fifth at the end of day 1. Local hero Dani Sordo led Hyundai in second, followed by Elfyn Evans in third in a Ford Fiesta WRC. Nine-time world champion Sébastien Loeb stalled his C3 at the opening stage in Barcelona, but he managed to recover to fourth place overall, just half a second off the podium. Sixth-place Andreas Mikkelsen was unable to find his form in the morning loop, but a setting adjustment put him on a charge and allowed him to end the day ahead of defending world champion Sébastien Ogier, who was fastest in Shakedown and the 2.97-kilometer-long street stage on Thursday. Craig Breen was in fifth before the final stage despite a spin, but the Irishman lost a chunk of his C3's rear wing and dropped to eighth overall. Championship leader Thierry Neuville didn't start well. The Belgian rolled his Hyundai i20 Coupe WRC at the Shakedown and damaged to the front left, the bonnet and roof. Being first on the road, he was also struggling with his car's handling. He eventually finished the day nearly one minute off the lead in ninth overall ahead of Esapekka Lappi, who slid off the road in the morning and spun later on.

=== Leg 2 ===
Tyre choice was crucial on day 2. Toyota duo Ott Tänak and Jari-Matti Latvala chose full wet tyres for the morning loop and set brilliant pace. Despite their tyre choices, rally leader Tänak plunged to eighth after changing a front-left punctured tyre cost them about two minutes of time, which made local hero Dani Sordo the new rally leader. Stage conditions changed in the afternoon, meaning crews who chose wet tyres unable to match the pace set by those who used slick tyres. Championship leader Thierry Neuville benefited from slicks, finishing the day in fifth, 12.7 seconds off the lead. Teammate Sordo didn't have a good run. Although he made the same choice as Neuville, he encountered muddy roads due to being lower in the running order, which dropped him down to sixth.

After the chaotic leg 2, Latvala led the rally, just 4.7 seconds ahead of defending world champion Sébastien Ogier, who took his chance with wet weather tyres in the afternoon and gained three places. Nine-time world champion Sébastien Loeb was 3.3 seconds further behind, edging Elfyn Evans by 1.8 seconds. Hyundai's Neuville and Sordo ended in fifth and sixth respectively. The top six crews were separated by just twenty seconds. Esapekka Lappi completed the day in seventh after a lurid sixth-gear spin, followed by early leader Tänak. Craig Breen had two spins in the day and finished ahead of Andreas Mikkelsen in tenth.

=== Leg 3 ===
Choosing the hard compound tyre, Sébastien Loeb charged into the lead and eventually won his first rally since 2013 Rally Argentina. This was also Citroën's first rally victory of the season. Defending world champion Sébastien Ogier found something extra in his Ford Fiesta WRC and completed the rally in second with four additional Power Stage points. The Frenchman will go to Rally Australia as the championship leader. Teammate Elfyn Evans also found his form in the rally and successfully held the Hyundai drivers Thierry Neuville — who suffered an unexpected puncture caused by a stone at the last few kilometers of the event — and Dani Sordo behind to snatch his second podium finish of the year. Jari-Matti Latvala was leading, but another puncture in the second-last stage pushed him down to sixth. He eventually finished the rally in eighth after giving positions to his title contender teammate Ott Tänak and Esapekka Lappi respectively, with Craig Breen and Andreas Mikkelsen completing the top ten finishers.

== Classification ==
=== Final results ===
| Pos. | No. | Driver | Co-driver | Entrant | Car | Class | Time | Difference | |
| Pos. | No. | Driver | Co-driver | Entrant | Car | Class | Time | to 1st | to prev. |
|---|---|---|---|---|---|---|---|---|---|
| 1 | 10 | (France) Sébastien Loeb | (Monaco) Daniel Elena | (France) Citroën Total Abu Dhabi WRT | Citroën C3 WRC | WRC | 3:12:08.0 | 0.0 | 0.0 |
| 2 | 1 | (France) Sébastien Ogier | (France) Julien Ingrassia | (United Kingdom) M-Sport Ford WRT | Ford Fiesta WRC | WRC | 3:12:10.9 | +2.9 | +2.9 |
| 3 | 2 | (United Kingdom) Elfyn Evans | (United Kingdom) Daniel Barritt | (United Kingdom) M-Sport Ford WRT | Ford Fiesta WRC | WRC | 3:12:24.5 | +16.5 | +13.6 |
| 4 | 5 | (Belgium) Thierry Neuville | (Belgium) Nicolas Gilsoul | (South Korea) Hyundai Shell Mobis WRT | Hyundai i20 Coupe WRC | WRC | 3:12:25.0 | +17.0 | +0.5 |
| 5 | 6 | (Spain) Dani Sordo | (Spain) Carlos del Barrio | (South Korea) Hyundai Shell Mobis WRT | Hyundai i20 Coupe WRC | WRC | 3:12:26.6 | +18.6 | +1.6 |
| 6 | 8 | (Estonia) Ott Tänak | (Estonia) Martin Järveoja | (Japan) Toyota Gazoo Racing WRT | Toyota Yaris WRC | WRC | 3:13:11.9 | +1:03.9 | +45.3 |
| 7 | 9 | (Finland) Esapekka Lappi | (Finland) Janne Ferm | (Japan) Toyota Gazoo Racing WRT | Toyota Yaris WRC | WRC | 3:13:24.6 | +1:16.6 | +12.7 |
| 8 | 7 | (Finland) Jari-Matti Latvala | (Finland) Miikka Anttila | (Japan) Toyota Gazoo Racing WRT | Toyota Yaris WRC | WRC | 3:13:34.4 | +1:26.4 | +9.8 |
| 9 | 11 | (Republic of Ireland) Craig Breen | (United Kingdom) Scott Martin | (France) Citroën Total Abu Dhabi WRT | Citroën C3 WRC | WRC | 3:14:15.0 | +2:07.0 | +40.6 |
| 10 | 4 | (Norway) Andreas Mikkelsen | (Norway) Anders Jæger-Synnevaag | (South Korea) Hyundai Shell Mobis WRT | Hyundai i20 Coupe WRC | WRC | 3:14:56.2 | +2:48.2 | +41.2 |
| 11 | 3 | (Finland) Teemu Suninen | (Finland) Mikko Markkula | (United Kingdom) M-Sport Ford WRT | Ford Fiesta WRC | WRC | 3:16:00.0 | +3:52.0 | +1:03.8 |
| 12 | 32 | (Finland) Kalle Rovanperä | (Finland) Jonne Halttunen | (Czech Republic) Škoda Motorsport II | Škoda Fabia R5 | WRC-2 | 3:20:47.6 | +8:39.6 | +4:47.6 |
| 13 | 31 | (Czech Republic) Jan Kopecký | (Czech Republic) Pavel Dresler | (Czech Republic) Škoda Motorsport II | Škoda Fabia R5 | WRC-2 | 3:20:56.1 | +8:48.1 | +8.5 |
| 14 | 49 | (Norway) Petter Solberg | (Norway) Veronica Gulbæk Engan | (Germany) Volkswagen Motorsport | Volkswagen Polo GTI R5 | WRC-2 | 3:22:24.2 | +10:16.2 | +1:28.1 |
| 15 | 40 | (Poland) Kajetan Kajetanowicz | (Poland) Maciej Szczepaniak | (Poland) Lotos Rally Team | Ford Fiesta R5 | WRC-2 | 3:22:47.2 | +10:39.2 | +23.0 |
| 16 | 44 | (Spain) Nil Solans | (Spain) Marc Martí | (Spain) Nil Solans | Ford Fiesta R5 | WRC-2 | 3:23:46.9 | +11:38.9 | +59.7 |
| 17 | 50 | (Norway) Henning Solberg | (Austria) Ilka Minor-Petrasko | (Turkey) Toksport WRT | Škoda Fabia R5 | WRC-2 | 3:25:35.0 | +13:27.0 | +1:48.1 |
| 18 | 38 | (France) Pierre-Louis Loubet | (France) Vincent Landais | (Italy) BRC Racing Team | Hyundai i20 R5 | WRC-2 | 3:25:41.1 | +13:33.1 | +6.1 |
| 19 | 34 | (Italy) Fabio Andolfi | (Italy) Simone Scattolin | (Italy) ACI Team Italia WRC | Škoda Fabia R5 | WRC-2 | 3:32:59.6 | +20:51.6 | +7:18.5 |
| 20 | 36 | (Norway) Ole Christian Veiby | (Norway) Stig Rune Skjærmoen | (France) Citroën Total Rallye Team | Citroën C3 R5 | WRC-2 | 3:33:20.5 | +21:12.5 | +20.9 |
| 21 | 12 | (United Arab Emirates) Khalid Al-Qassimi | (United Kingdom) Chris Patterson | (France) Citroën Total Abu Dhabi WRT | Citroën C3 WRC | WRC | 3:33:36.6 | +21:28.6 | +16.1 |
| 22 | 41 | (Romania) Simone Tempestini | (Romania) Sergio Itu | (Romania) Simone Tempestini | Citroën C3 R5 | WRC-2 | 3:37:42.9 | +25:34.9 | +4:06.3 |
| 23 | 35 | (Finland) Jari Huttunen | (Finland) Antti Linnaketo | (South Korea) Hyundai Motorsport | Hyundai i20 R5 | WRC-2 | 3:41:56.7 | +29:48.7 | +4:13.8 |
| 24 | 39 | (Japan) Takamoto Katsuta | (Finland) Marko Salminen | (Finland) Tommi Mäkinen Racing | Ford Fiesta R5 | WRC-2 | 3:42:09.9 | +30:01.9 | +13.2 |
| 25 | 81 | (Spain) Escudería Osona | (Spain) Albert Orriols | (Spain) Lluis Pujolar | Škoda Fabia R5 | —N/a | 3:43:27.6 | +31:19.6 | +1:17.7 |
| 26 | 94 | (Spain) Jan Solans | (Spain) Mauro Barreiro | (Spain) Escudería Motor Terrassa | Peugeot 208 R2 | —N/a | 3:45:04.6 | +32:56.6 | +1:37.0 |
| 27 | 92 | (France) Jean-Baptiste Franceschi | (France) Romain Courbon | Équipe de France FFSA Rally | Ford Fiesta R2T | —N/a | 3:45:07.1 | +32:59.1 | +2.5 |
| 28 | 95 | (Spain) Josep Bassas Mas | (Spain) Manel Muñoz | (Spain) RACC Motorsport | Peugeot 208 R2 | National, Peugeot Rally Cup | 3:45:50.6 | +33:42.6 | +43.5 |
| 29 | 45 | (United Kingdom) Chris Ingram | (United Kingdom) Ross Whittock | (Turkey) Toksport WRT | Škoda Fabia R5 | WRC-2 | 3:46:28.3 | +34:20.3 | +37.7 |
| 30 | 83 | (France) Jean-Michel Raoux | (France) Laurent Magat | (France) Jean-Michel Raoux | Citroën DS3 WRC | —N/a | 3:47:22.4 | +35:14.4 | +54.1 |
| 31 | 52 | (Spain) Jose Maria López | (Spain) Borja Rozada | (Spain) Sports & you | Citroën C3 R5 | WRC-2 | 3:52:44.6 | +40:36.6 | +5:22.2 |
| 32 | 37 | (France) Stéphane Lefebvre | (France) Gabin Moreau | (France) Citroën Total Rallye Team | Citroën C3 R5 | WRC-2 | 3:56:28.9 | +44:20.9 | +3:44.3 |
| 33 | 33 | (Poland) Łukasz Pieniążek | (Poland) Przemysław Mazur | (Finland) Printsport | Škoda Fabia R5 | WRC-2 | 3:57:05.9 | +44:57.9 | +37.0 |
| 34 | 62 | (Italy) Enrico Brazzoli | (Italy) Luca Beltrame | (Italy) Enrico Brazzoli | Peugeot 208 R2 | WRC-3 | 3:58:18.3 | +46:10.3 | +1:12.4 |
| 35 | 47 | (France) Eric Camilli | (France) Benjamin Veillas | (Germany) Volkswagen Motorsport | Volkswagen Polo GTI R5 | WRC-2 | 4:01:26.3 | +49:18.3 | +3:08.0 |
| 36 | 97 | (Spain) Roberto Blach Jr. | (Spain) José Murado | (Spain) Gamace MC Competición | Peugeot 208 R2 | National, Peugeot Rally Cup | 4:01:34.4 | +49:26.4 | +8.1 |
| 37 | 113 | (Spain) Alexis Romero Hernández | (Spain) Martín Domínguez Cedrés | (Spain) C.D. El Mentidero Racing Tías | Peugeot 208 R2 | —N/a | 4:01:58.6 | +49:50.6 | +24.2 |
| 38 | 61 | (Finland) Taisko Lario | (Finland) Tatu Hämäläinen | (Finland) Taisko Lario | Peugeot 208 R2 | WRC-3 | 4:02:36.3 | +50:28.3 | +37.7 |
| 39 | 108 | (Argentina) Luciano Bonomi | (Argentina) Laureano Grigera | (Argentina) Luciano Bonomi | Peugeot 208 R2 | —N/a | 4:05:58.6 | +53:50.6 | +3:22.3 |
| 40 | 93 | (United Kingdom) Tom Williams | (United Kingdom) Phil Hall | (United Kingdom) Tom Williams | Ford Fiesta R2T | —N/a | 4:07:49.3 | +55:41.3 | +1:50.7 |
| 41 | 107 | (United Kingdom) Nabila Tejpar | (United Kingdom) Max Freeman | (United Kingdom) Nabila Tejpar | Peugeot 208 R2 | Peugeot Rally Cup | 4:13:36.5 | +1:01:28.5 | +5:47.2 |
| 42 | 84 | (Republic of Ireland) Eamonn Boland | (Republic of Ireland) Michael Joseph Morrissey | (Republic of Ireland) Eamonn Boland | Ford Fiesta R2 | —N/a | 4:14:03.9 | +1:01:55.9 | +27.4 |
| 43 | 86 | (Netherlands) Henk Bakkenes | (Belgium) Cindy Verbaeten | (Netherlands) Henk Bakkenes | Mitsubishi Lancer Evo X | —N/a | 4:15:09.5 | +1:03:01.5 | +1:05.6 |
| 44 | 115 | (France) Philippe Gomez | (France) Gilles Combe | (France) Philippe Gomez | Peugeot 208 R2 | —N/a | 4:07:49.3 | +55:41.3 | +1:50.7 |
| 45 | 117 | (Italy) Paolo Raviglione | (Italy) Marco Demontis | (Italy) Paolo Raviglione | Ford Fiesta R2T | —N/a | 4:15:36.6 | +1:03:28.6 | +27.1 |
| 46 | 85 | (Italy) Fabrizio Arengi Bentivoglio | (Italy) Fabio Salis | (Italy) Fabrizio Arengi Bentivoglio | Peugeot 208 T16 R5 | —N/a | 4:21:21.0 | +1:09:13.0 | +1:08.6 |
| 47 | 114 | (France) Luc Gellusseau | (France) Charles-Antoine De Joux | (France) Luc Gellusseau | Peugeot 208 R2 | —N/a | 4:29:32.3 | +1:17:24.3 | +8:11.3 |
| 48 | 63 | (United Kingdom) Louise Cook | (United Kingdom) Stefan Davis | (United Kingdom) Louise Cook | Ford Fiesta R2 | WRC-3 | 4:32:19.8 | +1:20:11.8 | +2:47.5 |
| 49 | 90 | (Spain) Mariano Parés Carrió | (Spain) Pere Requena Palomares | (Spain) Zamudio Racing Elkartea | Ford Fiesta N5 | National | 4:40:00.2 | +1:27:52.2 | +7:40.4 |
| 50 | 46 | (Bolivia) Marco Bulacia Wilkinson | (Argentina) Fernando Mussano | (Bolivia) Marco Bulacia Wilkinson | Ford Fiesta R5 | WRC-2 | 4:40:32.3 | +1:28:24.3 | +32.1 |
| 51 | 118 | (Spain) Anna Tallada Bayot | (Spain) Laura Camps Trabal | (Spain) Motor Club Sabadell | Ford Fiesta R2T | —N/a | 4:45:42.6 | +1:33:34.6 | +5:10.3 |
| 52 | 112 | (Spain) Alberto Cotano | (Spain) Andreu Pascual | (Spain) GC Motorsport | Peugeot 208 R2 | —N/a | 4:56:16.8 | +1:44:08.8 | +10:34.2 |
| 53 | 87 | (Spain) Efrén Llarena | (Spain) Sara Fernández | (Spain) Zamudio Racing Elkartea | Peugeot 308 N5 | National | 5:39:41.5 | +2:27:33.5 | +43:24.7 |
| Ret | 116 | (Italy) Carlo Covi | (Italy) Simone Angi | (Italy) Carlo Covi | Peugeot 208 R2 | —N/a | Retired SS16 | | |
| Ret | 48 | (Spain) José Antonio Suárez | (Spain) Cándido Carrera | (Spain) José Antonio Suárez | Hyundai i20 R5 | WRC-2 | Retired SS15 | | |
| Ret | 109 | (Spain) Oriol Gómez Marco | (Spain) Axel Coronado Jiménez | (Spain) Gamace MC Competición | Peugeot 208 R2 | —N/a | Retired SS13 | | |
| Ret | 111 | (Spain) Miquel Labarias Cortés | (Spain) Cristian Muñoz Guil | (Spain) Escudería Motor Terrassa | Peugeot 208 R2 | —N/a | Retired SS11 | | |
| Ret | 89 | (Spain) Roberto Rozada | (Spain) Yeray Mújica | (Spain) RMC Motorsport | Ford Fiesta N5 | —N/a | Retired SS10 | | |
| Ret | 99 | (Spain) Julio Martínez Cazorla | (Spain) Diego Corta | (Spain) Escudería Drago Rallye | Ford Fiesta R2 | National | Retired SS9 | | |
| NC | 98 | (Spain) Álvaro Pérez Abeijon | (Spain) Brais Mirón | (Spain) Escudería Berberecho | Peugeot 208 R2 | National, Peugeot Rally Cup | Day 1 only | | |
| NC | 100 | (Portugal) Diogo Gago | (Portugal) Miguel Ramalho | (Portugal) MCoutinho Racing | Peugeot 208 R2 | Peugeot Rally Cup | Day 1 only | | |
| NC | 101 | (Portugal) Hugo Lopes | (Portugal) Nuno Mota Ribeiro | (Portugal) Hugo Lopes | Peugeot 208 R2 | Peugeot Rally Cup | Day 1 only | | |
| NC | 102 | (Portugal) Pedro Antunes | (Portugal) Paulo Lopes | (Portugal) Pedro Antunes | Peugeot 208 R2 | Peugeot Rally Cup | Day 1 only | | |
| NC | 104 | (Spain) Iván Medina Herrera | (Spain) Ariday Bonilla | (Spain) Escudería Aterura | Peugeot 208 R2 | Peugeot Rally Cup | Day 1 only | | |
| NC | 105 | (Spain) Alberto San Segundo | (Spain) Juan Luis García | (Spain) FMC-UCAV Racing Engineering | Peugeot 208 R2 | Peugeot Rally Cup | Day 1 only | | |
| NC | 110 | (Spain) Abel Torrelles | (Spain) Xavier Carulla | (Spain) GC Motorsport | Peugeot 208 R2 | Peugeot Rally Cup | Day 1 only | | |
| Ret | 43 | (United States) Ken Block | (United States) Alex Gelsomino | (United States) Hoonigan Racing Division | Ford Fiesta WRC | WRC | Retired SS7 | | |
| Ret | 51 | (France) Michel Sylvain | (France) Anthony Gorguilo | (France) Michel Sylvain | Škoda Fabia R5 | WRC-2 | Retired SS7 | | |
| Ret | 96 | (Spain) José Maria Reyes González | (Spain) José Antonio Vázquez Barrán | (Spain) Escudería A. Ferrol | Peugeot 208 R2 | National, Peugeot Rally Cup | Retired SS5 | | |
| Ret | 103 | (Portugal) Ricardo Sousa | (Portugal) Luís Marques | (Portugal) Ricardo Sousa | Peugeot 208 R2 | Peugeot Rally Cup | Retired SS4 | | |
| DNS | 42 | (Italy) Motorsport Italia | (Mexico) Benito Guerra | (Spain) Borja Rozada | Škoda Fabia R5 | WRC-2 | Did not start | | |
| DNS | 64 | (Belgium) Amaury Molle | (Belgium) Renaud Herman | (Belgium) Amaury Molle | Peugeot 208 R2 | WRC-3 | Did not start | | |
| DNS | 82 | (United Kingdom) Rhys Yates | (United Kingdom) Elliott Edmondson | (United Kingdom) Rhys Yates | Škoda Fabia R5 | —N/a | Did not start | | |
| DNS | 88 | (Spain) Fran Cima Artime | (Spain) Diego Sanjuan | (Spain) Renault Sport España | Renault Clio N5 | National | Did not start | | |
| DNS | 91 | (Austria) Michael Kogler | (Germany) André Kachel | (Austria) Michael Kogler | Citroën DS3 R3T | —N/a | Did not start | | |
| DNS | 106 | (Portugal) Paulo Moreira | (Portugal) Marco Macedo | (Portugal) Paulo Moreira | Peugeot 208 R2 | Peugeot Rally Cup | Did not start | | |

=== Point scorers ===
| Pos. | No. | Driver | Co-driver | Entrant | Car | Class | Points |
|---|---|---|---|---|---|---|---|
| 1 | 10 | (France) Sébastien Loeb | (Monaco) Daniel Elena | (France) Citroën Total Abu Dhabi WRT | Citroën C3 WRC | WRC | **25** in WRC, **3** from Power Stage |
| 2 | 1 | (France) Sébastien Ogier | (France) Julien Ingrassia | (United Kingdom) M-Sport Ford WRT | Ford Fiesta WRC | WRC | **18** in WRC, **4** from Power Stage |
| 3 | 2 | (United Kingdom) Elfyn Evans | (United Kingdom) Daniel Barritt | (United Kingdom) M-Sport Ford WRT | Ford Fiesta WRC | WRC | **15** in WRC, **2** from Power Stage |
| 4 | 5 | (Belgium) Thierry Neuville | (Belgium) Nicolas Gilsoul | (South Korea) Hyundai Shell Mobis WRT | Hyundai i20 Coupe WRC | WRC | **12** in WRC, **0** from Power Stage |
| 5 | 6 | (Spain) Dani Sordo | (Spain) Carlos del Barrio | (South Korea) Hyundai Shell Mobis WRT | Hyundai i20 Coupe WRC | WRC | **10** in WRC, **1** from Power Stage |
| 6 | 8 | (Estonia) Ott Tänak | (Estonia) Martin Järveoja | (Japan) Toyota Gazoo Racing WRT | Toyota Yaris WRC | WRC | **8** in WRC, **5** from Power Stage |
| 7 | 9 | (Finland) Esapekka Lappi | (Finland) Janne Ferm | (Japan) Toyota Gazoo Racing WRT | Toyota Yaris WRC | WRC | **6** in WRC, **0** from Power Stage |
| 8 | 7 | (Finland) Jari-Matti Latvala | (Finland) Miikka Anttila | (Japan) Toyota Gazoo Racing WRT | Toyota Yaris WRC | WRC | **4** in WRC, **0** from Power Stage |
| 9 | 11 | (Republic of Ireland) Craig Breen | (United Kingdom) Scott Martin | (France) Citroën Total Abu Dhabi WRT | Citroën C3 WRC | WRC | **2** in WRC, **0** from Power Stage |
| 10 | 4 | (Norway) Andreas Mikkelsen | (Norway) Anders Jæger-Synnevaag | (South Korea) Hyundai Shell Mobis WRT | Hyundai i20 Coupe WRC | WRC | **1** in WRC, **0** from Power Stage |
| 12 | 32 | (Finland) Kalle Rovanperä | (Finland) Jonne Halttunen | (Czech Republic) Škoda Motorsport II | Škoda Fabia R5 | WRC-2 | **25** in WRC-2 |
| 13 | 31 | (Czech Republic) Jan Kopecký | (Czech Republic) Pavel Dresler | (Czech Republic) Škoda Motorsport II | Škoda Fabia R5 | WRC-2 | **18** in WRC-2 |
| 14 | 49 | (Norway) Petter Solberg | (Norway) Veronica Gulbæk Engan | (Germany) Volkswagen Motorsport | Volkswagen Polo GTI R5 | WRC-2 | **15** in WRC-2 |
| 15 | 40 | (Poland) Kajetan Kajetanowicz | (Poland) Maciej Szczepaniak | (Poland) Lotos Rally Team | Ford Fiesta R5 | WRC-2 | **12** in WRC-2 |
| 16 | 44 | (Spain) Nil Solans | (Spain) Marc Martí | (Spain) Nil Solans | Ford Fiesta R5 | WRC-2 | **10** in WRC-2 |
| 17 | 50 | (Norway) Henning Solberg | (Austria) Ilka Minor-Petrasko | (Turkey) Toksport WRT | Škoda Fabia R5 | WRC-2 | **8** in WRC-2 |
| 18 | 38 | (France) Pierre-Louis Loubet | (France) Vincent Landais | (Italy) BRC Racing Team | Hyundai i20 R5 | WRC-2 | **6** in WRC-2 |
| 19 | 34 | (Italy) Fabio Andolfi | (Italy) Simone Scattolin | (Italy) ACI Team Italia WRC | Škoda Fabia R5 | WRC-2 | **4** in WRC-2 |
| 20 | 36 | (Norway) Ole Christian Veiby | (Norway) Stig Rune Skjærmoen | (France) Citroën Total Rallye Team | Citroën C3 R5 | WRC-2 | **2** in WRC-2 |
| 22 | 41 | (Romania) Simone Tempestini | (Romania) Sergio Itu | (Romania) Simone Tempestini | Citroën C3 R5 | WRC-2 | **1** in WRC-2 |
| 34 | 62 | (Italy) Enrico Brazzoli | (Italy) Luca Beltrame | (Italy) Enrico Brazzoli | Peugeot 208 R2 | WRC-3 | **25** in WRC-3 |
| 38 | 61 | (Finland) Taisko Lario | (Finland) Tatu Hämäläinen | (Finland) Taisko Lario | Peugeot 208 R2 | WRC-3 | **18** in WRC-3 |
| 48 | 63 | (United Kingdom) Louise Cook | (United Kingdom) Stefan Davis | (United Kingdom) Louise Cook | Ford Fiesta R2 | WRC-3 | **15** in WRC-3 |

=== Special stages ===
**Overall classification**
| Day | Stage | Name | Length | Winning crew | Car | Time | Class leaders |
| 25 October | — | Salou [Shakedown] | 2.97 km | (France) Sébastien Ogier — (France) Julien Ingrassia | Ford Fiesta WRC | 1:34.9 | —N/a |
| 25 October | SS1 | Barcelona | 3.20 km | (France) Sébastien Ogier — (France) Julien Ingrassia | Ford Fiesta WRC | 3:35.3 | (France) Sébastien Ogier — (France) Julien Ingrassia |
| 26 October | SS2 | Gandesa 1 | 7.00 km | (Estonia) Ott Tänak — (Estonia) Martin Järveoja | Toyota Yaris WRC | 4:19.6 | (France) Sébastien Ogier — (France) Julien Ingrassia |
| 26 October | SS3 | Pesells 1 | 26.59 km | (Finland) Jari-Matti Latvala — (Finland) Miikka Anttila | Toyota Yaris WRC | 14:36.5 | (Estonia) Ott Tänak — (Estonia) Martin Järveoja |
| 26 October | SS4 | La Fatarella - Vilalba 1 | 38.85 km | (Norway) Andreas Mikkelsen — (Norway) Anders Jæger-Synnevaag | Hyundai i20 Coupe WRC | 27:01.2 | (Estonia) Ott Tänak — (Estonia) Martin Järveoja |
| 26 October | SS5 | Gandesa 2 | 7.00 km | (Spain) Dani Sordo — (Spain) Carlos del Barrio | Hyundai i20 Coupe WRC | 4:14.7 | (Estonia) Ott Tänak — (Estonia) Martin Järveoja |
| 26 October | SS6 | Pesells 2 | 26.59 km | (Finland) Jari-Matti Latvala — (Finland) Miikka Anttila | Toyota Yaris WRC | 14:12.5 | (Estonia) Ott Tänak — (Estonia) Martin Järveoja |
| 26 October | SS7 | La Fatarella - Vilalba 2 | 38.85 km | (Finland) Jari-Matti Latvala — (Finland) Miikka Anttila | Toyota Yaris WRC | 26:13.2 | (Estonia) Ott Tänak — (Estonia) Martin Järveoja |
| 27 October | SS8 | Savallà 1 | 14.12 km | **Stage Cancelled** (Note: The stage was cancelled due to safety reasons.) | | | |
| 27 October | SS9 | Querol 1 | 21.46 km | (Estonia) Ott Tänak — (Estonia) Martin Järveoja | Toyota Yaris WRC | 11:30.6 | (Estonia) Ott Tänak — (Estonia) Martin Järveoja |
| 27 October | SS10 | El Montmell 1 | 24.40 km | (Finland) Jari-Matti Latvala — (Finland) Miikka Anttila | Toyota Yaris WRC | 12:58.4 | (Spain) Dani Sordo — (Spain) Carlos del Barrio |
| 27 October | SS11 | Savallà 2 | 14.12 km | (Belgium) Thierry Neuville — (Belgium) Nicolas Gilsoul | Hyundai i20 Coupe WRC | 7:47.1 | (Finland) Jari-Matti Latvala — (Finland) Miikka Anttila |
| 27 October | SS12 | Querol 2 | 21.46 km | (France) Sébastien Loeb — (Monaco) Daniel Elena | Citroën C3 WRC | 11:25.8 | (Finland) Jari-Matti Latvala — (Finland) Miikka Anttila |
| 27 October | SS13 | El Montmell 2 | 24.40 km | (Belgium) Thierry Neuville — (Belgium) Nicolas Gilsoul | Hyundai i20 Coupe WRC | 13:07.3 | (Finland) Jari-Matti Latvala — (Finland) Miikka Anttila |
| 27 October | SS14 | Salou | 2.24 km | (Estonia) Ott Tänak — (Estonia) Martin Järveoja | Toyota Yaris WRC | 2:41.9 | (Finland) Jari-Matti Latvala — (Finland) Miikka Anttila |
| 28 October | SS15 | Riudecanyes 1 | 16.35 km | (France) Sébastien Loeb — (Monaco) Daniel Elena | Citroën C3 WRC | 10:22.6 | (France) Sébastien Loeb — (Monaco) Daniel Elena |
| 28 October | SS16 | Santa Marina 1 | 14.50 km | (France) Sébastien Loeb — (Monaco) Daniel Elena | Citroën C3 WRC | 8:08.9 | (France) Sébastien Loeb — (Monaco) Daniel Elena |
| 28 October | SS17 | Riudecanyes 2 | 16.35 km | (France) Sébastien Ogier — (France) Julien Ingrassia | Ford Fiesta WRC | 10:14.2 | (France) Sébastien Loeb — (Monaco) Daniel Elena |
| 28 October | SS18 | Santa Marina 2 [Power stage] | 14.50 km | (Estonia) Ott Tänak — (Estonia) Martin Järveoja | Toyota Yaris WRC | 8:02.5 | (France) Sébastien Loeb — (Monaco) Daniel Elena |
**World Rally Championship-2**
| 25 October | — | Salou [Shakedown] | 2.97 km | (Norway) Petter Solberg — (Norway) Veronica Gulbæk Engan | Volkswagen Polo GTI R5 | 1:37.2 | —N/a |
| 25 October | SS1 | Barcelona | 3.20 km | (France) Eric Camilli — (France) Benjamin Veillas | Volkswagen Polo GTI R5 | 3:42.7 | (France) Eric Camilli — (France) Benjamin Veillas |
| 26 October | SS2 | Gandesa 1 | 7.00 km | (France) Eric Camilli — (France) Benjamin Veillas | Volkswagen Polo GTI R5 | 4:31.0 | (France) Eric Camilli — (France) Benjamin Veillas |
| 26 October | SS3 | Pesells 1 | 26.59 km | (Finland) Jari Huttunen — (Finland) Antti Linnaketo | Hyundai i20 R5 | 15:13.7 | (France) Eric Camilli — (France) Benjamin Veillas |
| 26 October | SS4 | La Fatarella - Vilalba 1 | 38.85 km | (Norway) Petter Solberg — (Norway) Veronica Gulbæk Engan | Volkswagen Polo GTI R5 | 27:56.8 | (France) Eric Camilli — (France) Benjamin Veillas |
| 26 October | SS5 | Gandesa 2 | 7.00 km | (Finland) Kalle Rovanperä — (Finland) Jonne Halttunen | Škoda Fabia R5 | 4:25.4 | (France) Eric Camilli — (France) Benjamin Veillas |
| 26 October | SS6 | Pesells 2 | 26.59 km | (France) Eric Camilli — (France) Benjamin Veillas | Volkswagen Polo GTI R5 | 14:51.9 | (France) Eric Camilli — (France) Benjamin Veillas |
| 26 October | SS7 | La Fatarella - Vilalba 2 | 38.85 km | (Finland) Kalle Rovanperä — (Finland) Jonne Halttunen | Škoda Fabia R5 | 27:15.1 | (France) Eric Camilli — (France) Benjamin Veillas |
| 27 October | SS8 | Savallà 1 | 14.12 km | **Stage Cancelled** | | | |
| 27 October | SS9 | Querol 1 | 21.46 km | (Spain) Nil Solans — (Spain) Marc Martí | Ford Fiesta R5 | 12:15.6 | (Finland) Kalle Rovanperä — (Finland) Jonne Halttunen |
| 27 October | SS10 | El Montmell 1 | 24.40 km | (Czech Republic) Jan Kopecký — (Czech Republic) Pavel Dresler | Škoda Fabia R5 | 13:44.9 | (Finland) Kalle Rovanperä — (Finland) Jonne Halttunen |
| 27 October | SS11 | Savallà 2 | 14.12 km | (Czech Republic) Jan Kopecký — (Czech Republic) Pavel Dresler | Škoda Fabia R5 | 8:15.9 | (Finland) Kalle Rovanperä — (Finland) Jonne Halttunen |
| 27 October | SS12 | Querol 2 | 21.46 km | (Spain) Nil Solans — (Spain) Marc Martí | Ford Fiesta R5 | 12:05.2 | (Finland) Kalle Rovanperä — (Finland) Jonne Halttunen |
| 27 October | SS13 | El Montmell 2 | 24.40 km | (Spain) Nil Solans — (Spain) Marc Martí | Ford Fiesta R5 | 13:54.1 | (Finland) Kalle Rovanperä — (Finland) Jonne Halttunen |
| 27 October | SS14 | Salou | 2.24 km | (Finland) Kalle Rovanperä — (Finland) Jonne Halttunen | Škoda Fabia R5 | 2:42.0 | (Finland) Kalle Rovanperä — (Finland) Jonne Halttunen |
| 28 October | SS15 | Riudecanyes 1 | 16.35 km | (Czech Republic) Jan Kopecký — (Czech Republic) Pavel Dresler | Škoda Fabia R5 | 10:51.5 | (Finland) Kalle Rovanperä — (Finland) Jonne Halttunen |
| 28 October | SS16 | Santa Marina 1 | 14.50 km | (Czech Republic) Jan Kopecký — (Czech Republic) Pavel Dresler | Škoda Fabia R5 | 8:36.5 | (Finland) Kalle Rovanperä — (Finland) Jonne Halttunen |
| 28 October | SS17 | Riudecanyes 2 | 16.35 km | (France) Eric Camilli — (France) Benjamin Veillas | Volkswagen Polo GTI R5 | 10:40.8 | (Finland) Kalle Rovanperä — (Finland) Jonne Halttunen |
| 28 October | SS18 | Santa Marina 2 | 14.50 km | (Czech Republic) Jan Kopecký — (Czech Republic) Pavel Dresler | Škoda Fabia R5 | 8:30.5 | (Finland) Kalle Rovanperä — (Finland) Jonne Halttunen |
**World Rally Championship-3**
| 25 October | — | Salou [Shakedown] | 2.97 km | (Finland) Taisko Lario — (Finland) Tatu Hämäläinen | Peugeot 208 R2 | 1:51.6 | —N/a |
| 25 October | SS1 | Barcelona | 3.20 km | (Italy) Enrico Brazzoli — (Italy) Luca Beltrame | Peugeot 208 R2 | 4:19.8 | (Italy) Enrico Brazzoli — (Italy) Luca Beltrame |
| 26 October | SS2 | Gandesa 1 | 7.00 km | (Finland) Taisko Lario — (Finland) Tatu Hämäläinen | Peugeot 208 R2 | 5:12.8 | (Finland) Taisko Lario — (Finland) Tatu Hämäläinen |
| 26 October | SS3 | Pesells 1 | 26.59 km | (Finland) Taisko Lario — (Finland) Tatu Hämäläinen | Peugeot 208 R2 | 17:49.1 | (Finland) Taisko Lario — (Finland) Tatu Hämäläinen |
| 26 October | SS4 | La Fatarella - Vilalba 1 | 38.85 km | (Finland) Taisko Lario — (Finland) Tatu Hämäläinen | Peugeot 208 R2 | 31:45.1 | (Finland) Taisko Lario — (Finland) Tatu Hämäläinen |
| 26 October | SS5 | Gandesa 2 | 7.00 km | (Finland) Taisko Lario — (Finland) Tatu Hämäläinen | Peugeot 208 R2 | 5:02.2 | (Finland) Taisko Lario — (Finland) Tatu Hämäläinen |
| 26 October | SS6 | Pesells 2 | 26.59 km | (Finland) Taisko Lario — (Finland) Tatu Hämäläinen | Peugeot 208 R2 | 17:06.8 | (Finland) Taisko Lario — (Finland) Tatu Hämäläinen |
| 26 October | SS7 | La Fatarella - Vilalba 2 | 38.85 km | (Italy) Enrico Brazzoli — (Italy) Luca Beltrame | Peugeot 208 R2 | 33:19.9 | (Italy) Enrico Brazzoli — (Italy) Luca Beltrame |
| 27 October | SS8 | Savallà 1 | 14.12 km | **Stage Cancelled** | | | |
| 27 October | SS9 | Querol 1 | 21.46 km | (Italy) Enrico Brazzoli — (Italy) Luca Beltrame | Peugeot 208 R2 | 14:03.0 | (Italy) Enrico Brazzoli — (Italy) Luca Beltrame |
| 27 October | SS10 | El Montmell 1 | 24.40 km | (Finland) Taisko Lario — (Finland) Tatu Hämäläinen | Peugeot 208 R2 | 15:56.1 | (Italy) Enrico Brazzoli — (Italy) Luca Beltrame |
| 27 October | SS11 | Savallà 2 | 14.12 km | (Finland) Taisko Lario — (Finland) Tatu Hämäläinen | Peugeot 208 R2 | 9:39.6 | (Italy) Enrico Brazzoli — (Italy) Luca Beltrame |
| 27 October | SS12 | Querol 2 | 21.46 km | (Italy) Enrico Brazzoli — (Italy) Luca Beltrame | Peugeot 208 R2 | 14:05.9 | (Italy) Enrico Brazzoli — (Italy) Luca Beltrame |
| 27 October | SS13 | El Montmell 2 | 24.40 km | (Finland) Taisko Lario — (Finland) Tatu Hämäläinen | Peugeot 208 R2 | 16:19.8 | (Italy) Enrico Brazzoli — (Italy) Luca Beltrame |
| 27 October | SS14 | Salou | 2.24 km | (Italy) Enrico Brazzoli — (Italy) Luca Beltrame | Peugeot 208 R2 | 3:11.6 | (Italy) Enrico Brazzoli — (Italy) Luca Beltrame |
| 28 October | SS15 | Riudecanyes 1 | 16.35 km | (Italy) Enrico Brazzoli — (Italy) Luca Beltrame | Peugeot 208 R2 | 12:15.4 | (Italy) Enrico Brazzoli — (Italy) Luca Beltrame |
| 28 October | SS16 | Santa Marina 1 | 14.50 km | (Finland) Taisko Lario — (Finland) Tatu Hämäläinen | Peugeot 208 R2 | 10:00.7 | (Italy) Enrico Brazzoli — (Italy) Luca Beltrame |
| 28 October | SS17 | Riudecanyes 2 | 16.35 km | (Finland) Taisko Lario — (Finland) Tatu Hämäläinen | Peugeot 208 R2 | 11:58.7 | (Italy) Enrico Brazzoli — (Italy) Luca Beltrame |
| 28 October | SS18 | Santa Marina 2 | 14.50 km | (Finland) Taisko Lario — (Finland) Tatu Hämäläinen | Peugeot 208 R2 | 9:41.8 | (Italy) Enrico Brazzoli — (Italy) Luca Beltrame |

=== Power stage ===
The Power stage was a 14.50 km stage at the end of the rally. Additional World Championship points were awarded to the five fastest crews.

| Pos. | Driver | Co-driver | Car | Time | Diff. | Pts. |
|---|---|---|---|---|---|---|
| 1 | (Estonia) Ott Tänak | (Estonia) Martin Järveoja | Toyota Yaris WRC | 8:02.5 | 0.0 | **5** |
| 2 | (France) Sébastien Ogier | (France) Julien Ingrassia | Ford Fiesta WRC | 8:04.6 | +2.0 | **4** |
| 3 | (France) Sébastien Loeb | (Monaco) Daniel Elena | Citroën C3 WRC | 8:05.3 | +2.8 | **3** |
| 4 | (United Kingdom) Elfyn Evans | (United Kingdom) Daniel Barritt | Ford Fiesta WRC | 8:05.7 | +3.1 | **2** |
| 5 | (Spain) Dani Sordo | (Spain) Carlos del Barrio | Hyundai i20 Coupe WRC | 8:07.2 | +4.6 | **1** |

=== Penalties ===
The following crews were given time penalties during the rally.

| Stage | No. | Driver | Co-driver | Entrant | Car | Class | Reason | Penalty |
|---|---|---|---|---|---|---|---|---|
| SS1 | 114 | (France) Luc Gellusseau | (France) Charles-Antoine De Joux | (France) Luc Gellusseau | Peugeot 208 R2 | —N/a | 1 minute early | 1:00 |
| SS2 | 114 | (France) Luc Gellusseau | (France) Charles-Antoine De Joux | (France) Luc Gellusseau | Peugeot 208 R2 | —N/a | 1 minute late | 0:10 |
| SS4 | 62 | (Italy) Enrico Brazzoli | (Italy) Luca Beltrame | (Italy) Enrico Brazzoli | Peugeot 208 R2 | WRC-3 | 2 minutes late | 0:20 |
| SS4 | 104 | (Spain) Escudería Aterura | (Spain) Iván Medina Herrera | (Spain) Ariday Bonilla | Peugeot 208 R2 | Peugeot Rally Cup | 1 minute late | 0:10 |
| SS4 | 105 | (Spain) Alberto San Segundo | (Spain) Juan Luis García | (Spain) FMC-UCAV Racing Engineering | Peugeot 208 R2 | Peugeot Rally Cup | 1 minute late | 0:10 |
| SS5 | 63 | (United Kingdom) Louise Cook | (United Kingdom) Stefan Davis | (United Kingdom) Louise Cook | Ford Fiesta R2 | WRC-3 | 15 minutes late | 2:30 |
| SS5 | 83 | (France) Jean-Michel Raoux | (France) Laurent Magat | (France) Jean-Michel Raoux | Citroën DS3 WRC | —N/a | 1 minute late | 0:10 |
| SS5 | 116 | (Italy) Carlo Covi | (Italy) Simone Angi | (Italy) Carlo Covi | Peugeot 208 R2 | —N/a | 1 minute late | 0:10 |
| SS6 | 89 | (Spain) Roberto Rozada | (Spain) Yeray Mújica | (Spain) RMC Motorsport | Ford Fiesta N5 | National | 1 minute late | 0:10 |
| SS6 | 95 | (Spain) Josep Bassas Mas | (Spain) Manel Muñoz | (Spain) RACC Motorsport | Peugeot 208 R2 | National, Peugeot Rally Cup | 2 minutes late | 0:20 |
| SS7 | 89 | (Spain) Roberto Rozada | (Spain) Yeray Mújica | (Spain) RMC Motorsport | Ford Fiesta N5 | National | 15 minutes late | 2:30 |
| SS7 | 92 | (France) Jean-Baptiste Franceschi | (France) Romain Courbon | Équipe de France FFSA Rally | Ford Fiesta R2T | —N/a | 2 minutes late | 0:20 |
| SS7 | 98 | (Spain) Álvaro Pérez Abeijon | (Spain) Brais Mirón | (Spain) Escudería Berberecho | Peugeot 208 R2 | National, Peugeot Rally Cup | 5 minutes late | 0:50 |
| SS7 | 116 | (Italy) Carlo Covi | (Italy) Simone Angi | (Italy) Carlo Covi | Peugeot 208 R2 | —N/a | 2 minutes late | 0:20 |
| SS10 | 39 | (Finland) Tommi Mäkinen Racing | (Japan) Takamoto Katsuta | (Finland) Marko Salminen | Ford Fiesta R5 | WRC-2 | 24 minutes late | 4:00 |
| SS13 | 52 | (Spain) Jose Maria López | (Spain) Borja Rozada | (Spain) Sports & you | Citroën C3 R5 | WRC-2 | 8 minutes late | 1:20 |
| SS15 | 84 | (Republic of Ireland) Eamonn Boland | (Republic of Ireland) Michael Joseph Morrissey | (Republic of Ireland) Eamonn Boland | Ford Fiesta R2 | —N/a | 1 minute early | 1:00 |
| SS15 | 85 | (Italy) Fabrizio Arengi Bentivoglio | (Italy) Fabio Salis | (Italy) Fabrizio Arengi Bentivoglio | Peugeot 208 T16 R5 | —N/a | 1 minute late | 1:00 |
| SS15 | 116 | (Italy) Carlo Covi | (Italy) Simone Angi | (Italy) Carlo Covi | Peugeot 208 R2 | —N/a | 1 minute early | 1:00 |
| SS16 | 107 | (United Kingdom) Nabila Tejpar | (United Kingdom) Max Freeman | (United Kingdom) Nabila Tejpar | Peugeot 208 R2 | Peugeot Rally Cup | 1 minute late | 0:10 |

=== Retirements ===
The following crews retired from the event. Under Rally2 regulations, they were eligible to re-enter the event starting from the next leg. Crews that re-entered were given an additional time penalty.

| Stage | No. | Driver | Co-driver | Entrant | Car | Class | Cause | Re-entry |
|---|---|---|---|---|---|---|---|---|
| SS1 | 85 | (Italy) Fabrizio Arengi Bentivoglio | (Italy) Fabrizio Arengi Bentivoglio | (Italy) Fabio Salis | Peugeot 208 T16 R5 | —N/a | Mechanical | Yes |
| SS3 | 33 | (Poland) Łukasz Pieniążek | (Poland) Przemysław Mazur | (Finland) Printsport | Škoda Fabia R5 | WRC-2 | Mechanical | Yes |
| SS3 | 37 | (France) Stéphane Lefebvre | (France) Gabin Moreau | (France) Citroën Total Rallye Team | Citroën C3 R5 | WRC-2 | Mechanical | Yes |
| SS3 | 46 | (Poland) Kajetan Kajetanowicz | (Poland) Maciej Szczepaniak | (Poland) Lotos Rally Team | Ford Fiesta R5 | WRC-2 | Mechanical | Yes |
| SS3 | 87 | (Spain) Efrén Llarena | (Spain) Sara Fernández | (Spain) Zamudio Racing Elkartea | Peugeot 308 N5 | —N/a | Mechanical | Yes |
| SS4 | 52 | (Spain) Jose Maria López | (Spain) Borja Rozada | (Spain) Sports & you | Citroën C3 R5 | WRC-2 | Mechanical | Yes |
| SS4 | 84 | (Republic of Ireland) Eamonn Boland | (Republic of Ireland) Michael Joseph Morrissey | (Republic of Ireland) Eamonn Boland | Ford Fiesta R2 | —N/a | Off road | Yes |
| SS4 | 103 | (Portugal) Ricardo Sousa | (Portugal) Luís Marques | (Portugal) Ricardo Sousa | Peugeot 208 R2 | Peugeot Rally Cup | Mechanical | No |
| SS4 | 118 | (Spain) Anna Tallada Bayot | (Spain) Laura Camps Trabal | (Spain) Motor Club Sabadell | Ford Fiesta R2T | —N/a | Mechanical | Yes |
| SS5 | 63 | (United Kingdom) Louise Cook | (United Kingdom) Stefan Davis | (United Kingdom) Louise Cook | Ford Fiesta R2 | WRC-3 | Mechanical | Yes |
| SS5 | 86 | (Netherlands) Henk Bakkenes | (Belgium) Cindy Verbaeten | (Netherlands) Henk Bakkenes | Mitsubishi Lancer Evo X | —N/a | Mechanical | Yes |
| SS5 | 96 | (Spain) José Maria Reyes González | (Spain) José Antonio Vázquez Barrán | (Spain) Escudería A. Ferrol | Peugeot 208 R2 | National, Peugeot Rally Cup | Mechanical | No |
| SS6 | 39 | (Japan) Takamoto Katsuta | (Finland) Marko Salminen | (Finland) Tommi Mäkinen Racing | Ford Fiesta R5 | WRC-2 | Mechanical | Yes |
| SS6 | 90 | (Spain) Mariano Parés Carrió | (Spain) Pere Requena Palomares | (Spain) Zamudio Racing Elkartea | Ford Fiesta N5 | National | Mechanical | Yes |
| SS7 | 34 | (Italy) Fabio Andolfi | (Italy) Simone Scattolin | (Italy) ACI Team Italia WRC | Škoda Fabia R5 | WRC-2 | Off road | Yes |
| SS7 | 36 | (Norway) Ole Christian Veiby | (Norway) Stig Rune Skjærmoen | (France) Citroën Total Rallye Team | Citroën C3 R5 | WRC-2 | Mechanical | Yes |
| SS7 | 43 | (United States) Ken Block | (United States) Alex Gelsomino | (United States) Hoonigan Racing Division | Ford Fiesta WRC | WRC | Off road | No |
| SS7 | 51 | (France) Michel Sylvain | (France) Anthony Gorguilo | (France) Michel Sylvain | Škoda Fabia R5 | WRC-2 | Mechanical | No |
| SS7 | 61 | (Finland) Taisko Lario | (Finland) Taisko Lario | (Finland) Tatu Hämäläinen | Peugeot 208 R2 | WRC-3 | No credit post | Yes |
| SS7 | 99 | (Spain) Julio Martínez Cazorla | (Spain) Diego Corta | (Spain) Escudería Drago Rallye | Ford Fiesta R2 | National | Mechanical | Yes |
| SS7 | 112 | (Spain) Alberto Cotano | (Spain) Andreu Pascual | (Spain) GC Motorsport | Peugeot 208 R2 | —N/a | Mechanical | Yes |
| SS8 | 87 | (Spain) Efrén Llarena | (Spain) Sara Fernández | (Spain) Zamudio Racing Elkartea | Peugeot 308 N5 | —N/a | Mechanical | Yes |
| SS9 | 46 | (Bolivia) Marco Bulacia Wilkinson | (Argentina) Fernando Mussano | (Bolivia) Marco Bulacia Wilkinson | Ford Fiesta R5 | WRC-2 | Off road | Yes |
| SS9 | 99 | (Spain) Julio Martínez Cazorla | (Spain) Diego Corta | (Spain) Escudería Drago Rallye | Ford Fiesta R2 | National | Mechanical | No |
| SS9 | 112 | (Spain) Alberto Cotano | (Spain) Andreu Pascual | (Spain) GC Motorsport | Peugeot 208 R2 | —N/a | Off road | Yes |
| SS10 | 48 | (Spain) José Antonio Suárez | (Spain) Cándido Carrera | (Spain) José Antonio Suárez | Hyundai i20 R5 | WRC-2 | Mechanical | Yes |
| SS10 | 89 | (Spain) Roberto Rozada | (Spain) Yeray Mújica | (Spain) RMC Motorsport | Ford Fiesta N5 | —N/a | Off road | No |
| SS11 | 111 | (Spain) Miquel Labarias Cortés | (Spain) Cristian Muñoz Guil | (Spain) Escudería Motor Terrassa | Peugeot 208 R2 | —N/a | Maximum Lateness | No |
| SS13 | 109 | (Spain) Oriol Gómez Marco | (Spain) Axel Coronado Jiménez | (Spain) Gamace MC Competición | Peugeot 208 R2 | —N/a | Mechanical | No |
| SS15 | 48 | (Spain) José Antonio Suárez | (Spain) Cándido Carrera | (Spain) José Antonio Suárez | Hyundai i20 R5 | WRC-2 | Mechanical | No |
| SS16 | 116 | (Italy) Carlo Covi | (Italy) Simone Angi | (Italy) Carlo Covi | Peugeot 208 R2 | —N/a | Off road | No |

=== Championship standings after the rally ===
- **Bold text** indicates 2018 World Champions.

==== Drivers' championships ====
**World Rally Championship**
| | Pos. | Driver | Points |
| 1 | 1 | (France) Sébastien Ogier | 204 |
| 1 | 2 | (Belgium) Thierry Neuville | 201 |
| | 3 | (Estonia) Ott Tänak | 181 |
| | 4 | (Finland) Esapekka Lappi | 110 |
| | 5 | (Finland) Jari-Matti Latvala | 102 |
**World Rally Championship-2**
| | Pos. | Driver | Points |
| | 1 | **(Czech Republic) Jan Kopecký** | 143 |
| | 2 | (Sweden) Pontus Tidemand | 111 |
| 1 | 3 | (Finland) Kalle Rovanperä | 90 |
| 1 | 4 | (United Kingdom) Gus Greensmith | 70 |
| | 5 | (Poland) Łukasz Pieniążek | 56 |
**World Rally Championship-3**
| | Pos. | Driver | Points |
| 4 | 1 | (Italy) Enrico Brazzoli | 98 |
| | 2 | (Finland) Taisko Lario | 97 |
| 1 | 3 | (Sweden) Emil Bergkvist | 86 |
| 1 | 4 | (Sweden) Denis Rådström | 80 |
| 1 | 5 | (France) Jean-Baptiste Franceschi | 79 |

==== Co-Drivers' championships ====
**World Rally Championship**
| | Pos. | Co-Driver | Points |
| 1 | 1 | (France) Julien Ingrassia | 204 |
| 1 | 2 | (Belgium) Nicolas Gilsoul | 201 |
| | 3 | (Estonia) Martin Järveoja | 181 |
| | 4 | (Finland) Janne Ferm | 110 |
| | 5 | (Finland) Miikka Anttila | 102 |
**World Rally Championship-2**
| | Pos. | Co-Driver | Points |
| | 1 | **(Czech Republic) Pavel Dresler** | 143 |
| | 2 | (Sweden) Jonas Andersson | 111 |
| | 3 | (Finland) Jonne Halttunen | 90 |
| | 4 | (Poland) Przemysław Mazur | 56 |
| | 5 | (United Kingdom) Craig Parry | 55 |
**World Rally Championship-3**
| | Pos. | Co-Driver | Points |
| 3 | 1 | (Italy) Luca Beltrame | 98 |
| 1 | 2 | (Finland) Tatu Hämäläinen | 97 |
| 1 | 3 | (Sweden) Johan Johansson | 80 |
| 1 | 4 | (France) Romain Courbon | 79 |
| 1 | 5 | (United Kingdom) Stefan Davis | 59 |

==== Manufacturers' and teams' championships ====
**World Rally Championship**
| | Pos. | Manufacturer | Points |
| | 1 | (Japan) Toyota Gazoo Racing WRT | 331 |
| | 2 | (South Korea) Hyundai Shell Mobis WRT | 319 |
| | 3 | (United Kingdom) M-Sport Ford WRT | 306 |
| | 4 | (France) Citroën Total Abu Dhabi WRT | 216 |
**World Rally Championship-2**
| | Pos. | Team | Points |
| | 1 | (Czech Republic) Škoda Motorsport II | 150 |
| | 2 | (Czech Republic) Škoda Motorsport | 133 |
| | 3 | (Finland) Printsport | 81 |
| 1 | 4 | (Italy) ACI Team Italia WRC | 80 |
| 1 | 5 | (South Korea) Hyundai Motorsport | 76 |
**World Rally Championship-3**
| | Pos. | Team | Points |
| | 1 | (Italy) ACI Team Italia | 83 |
| | 2 | (Turkey) Castrol Ford Team Turkiye | 67 |
| | 3 | (Estonia) OT Racing | 62 |
| | 4 | (Germany) ADAC Sachsen | 62 |
| | 5 | Équipe de France FFSA Rally | 55 |

== Notes ==
| Previous rally: 2018 Wales Rally GB | 2018 FIA World Rally Championship | Next rally: 2018 Rally Australia |
| Previous rally: 2017 Rally Catalunya | 2018 Rally Catalunya | Next rally: 2019 Rally Catalunya |
