= 2018 WRC2 Championship =

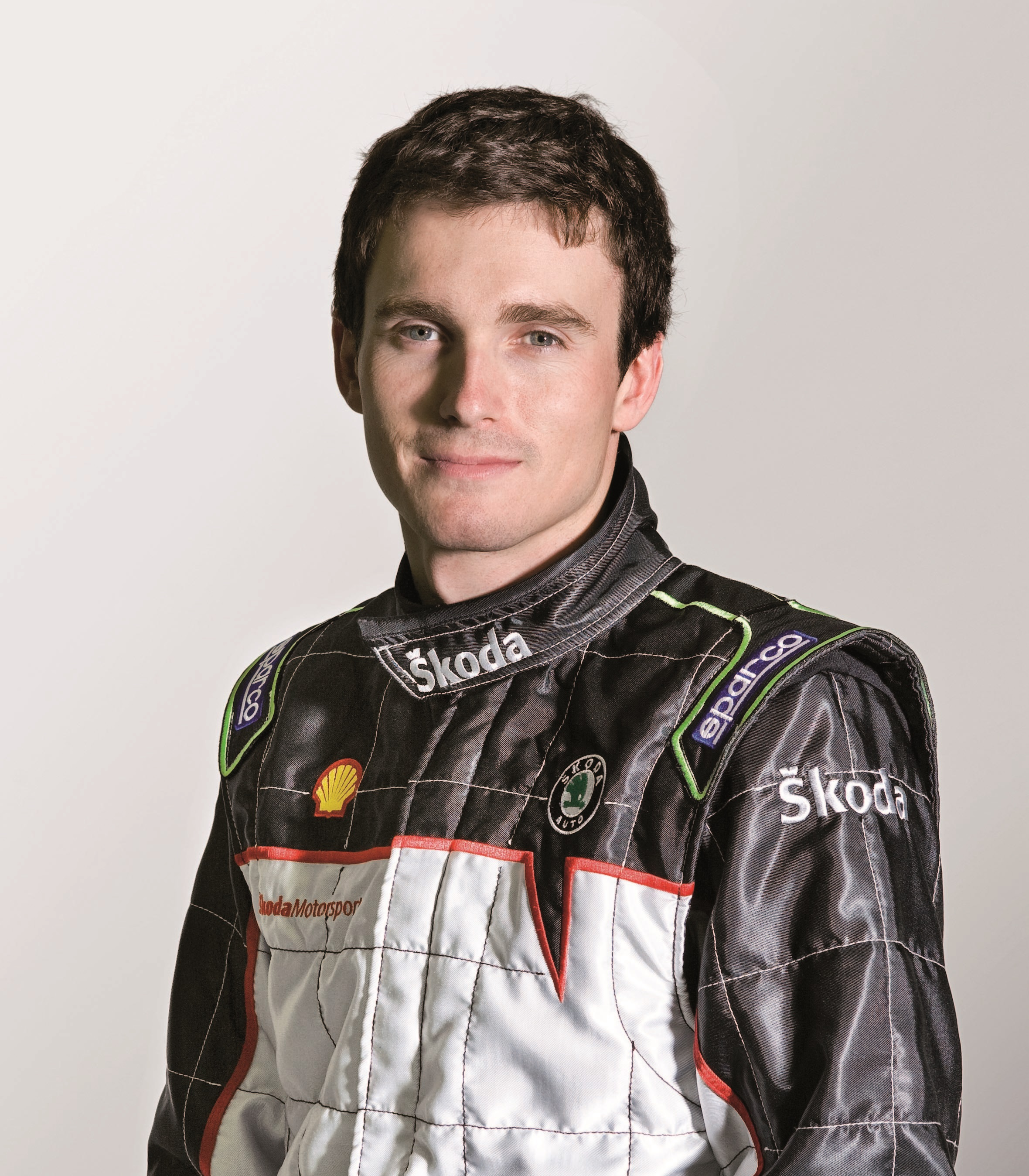
Jan Kopecký defeated former champion Pontus Tidemand to the title.

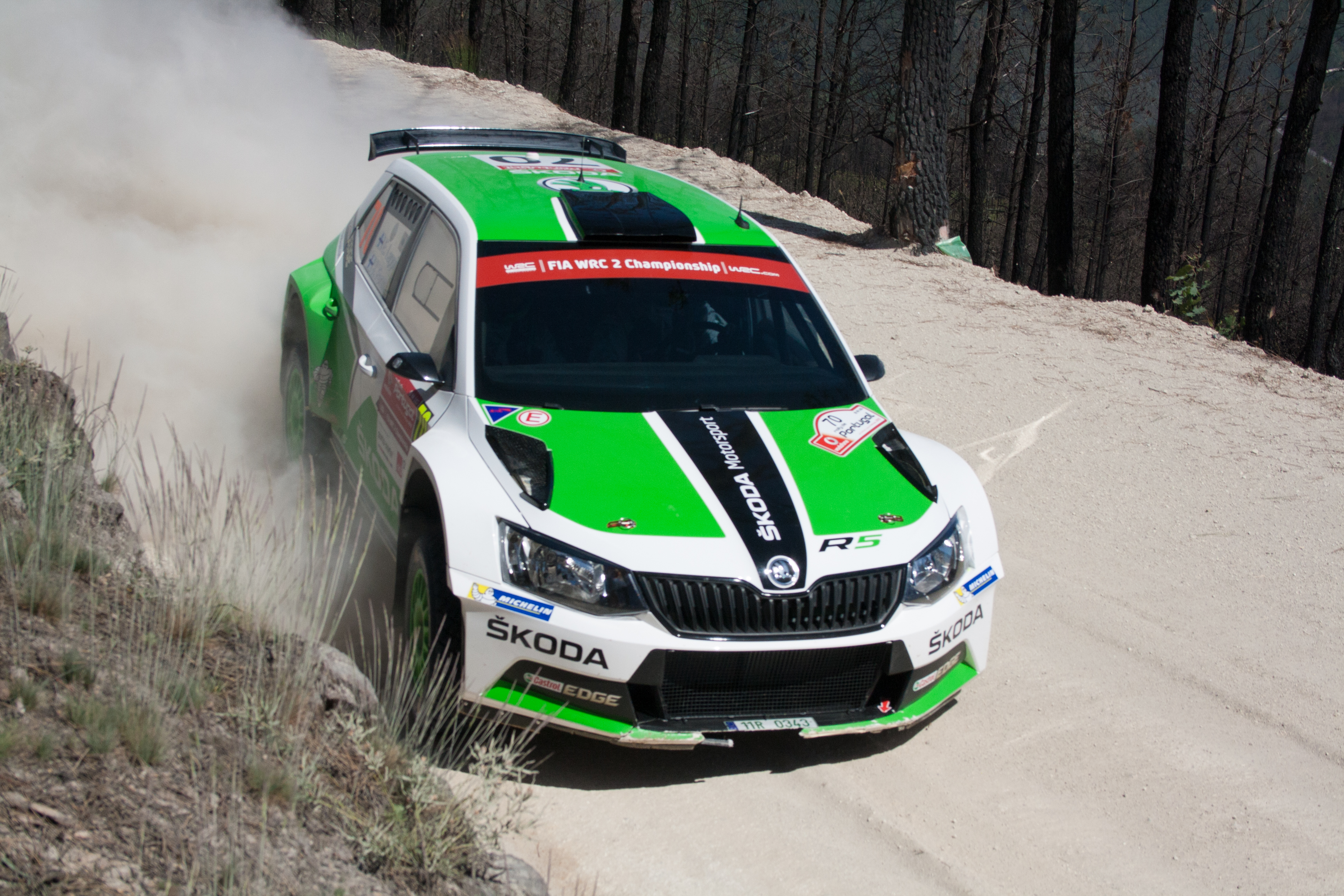
Škoda Motorsport became teams' champion for the third time.

The 2018 FIA WRC2 Championship was the sixth season of WRC2, a rallying championship organised and governed by the Fédération Internationale de l'Automobile, running in support of the World Rally Championship. The championship was open to cars complying with R4, R5, and Super 2000 regulations.

Pontus Tidemand and Jonas Andersson were the defending drivers' and co-drivers' champions. Škoda Motorsport were the defending teams' champions. Although Škoda Motorsport went on to win the teams' championship for the third year in a row, Jan Kopecký and Pavel Dresler succeeded for the drivers' and co-drivers' titles defeating the former champions.

== Calendar ==
The championship was contested over thirteen rounds in Europe, the Middle East, the Americas and Oceania.

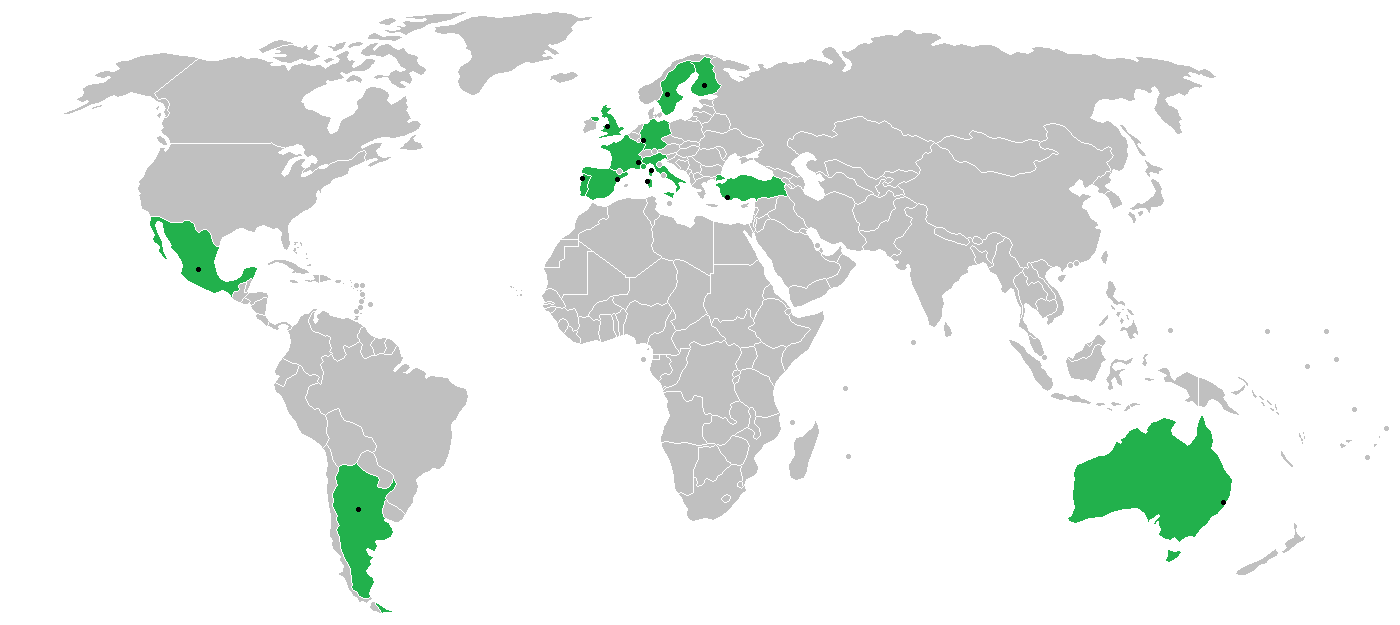
A map showing the locations of the rallies in the 2018 World Rally Championship season.

Round	Dates		Rally	Rally headquarters	Rally details		
Round	Start	Finish	Rally	Rally headquarters	Surface	Stages	Distance
1	25 January	28 January	(Monaco) Rallye Automobile Monte Carlo	Gap, Provence-Alpes-Côte d'Azur (Note: The rally base of the Monte Carlo Rally was located in France.)	Mixed (Note: Rallye Monte Carlo was run on a tarmac and snow surface.)	17	394.74 km
2	15 February	18 February	Rally Sweden	Torsby, Värmland	Snow	19	314.25 km
3	8 March	11 March	(Mexico) Rally Guanajuato México	León, Guanajuato	Gravel	22	344.49 km
4	5 April	8 April	(France) Tour de Corse	Bastia, Haute-Corse	Tarmac	12	333.48 km
5	26 April	29 April	Rally Argentina	Villa Carlos Paz, Córdoba	Gravel	18	358.25 km
6	17 May	20 May	Rally de Portugal	Matosinhos, Porto	Gravel	20	358.19 km
7	7 June	10 June	(Italy) Rally Italia Sardegna	Alghero, Sardinia	Gravel	20	313.46 km
8	26 July	29 July	Rally Finland	Jyväskylä, Keski-Suomi	Gravel	23	317.26 km
9	16 August	19 August	(Germany) ADAC Rallye Deutschland	Bostalsee, Saarland	Tarmac	18	325.76 km
10	13 September	16 September	Marmaris Rally of Turkey	Marmaris, Muğla	Gravel	17	312.44 km
11	4 October	7 October	(United Kingdom) Wales Rally GB	Deeside, Flintshire	Gravel	23	318.34 km
12	25 October	28 October	(Spain) RACC Rally Catalunya de España	Salou, Tarragona	Mixed (Note: Rally Catalunya was run on a tarmac and gravel surface.)	18	331.58 km
13	15 November	18 November	Rally Australia	Coffs Harbour, New South Wales	Gravel	24	318.64 km

=== Calendar changes ===
The Rally of Poland was removed from the calendar after the FIA repeatedly raised concerns about the event's safety. The FIA had previously ordered a review of the event's safety standards ahead of the 2017 event, threatening to rescind the rally's World Championship status if conditions were not improved.

The Rally of Poland was replaced by the Rally of Turkey, which returned to the calendar for the first time since 2010. The event, which was previously based in Istanbul, return to south-western Turkey. It was based in the coastal resort town of Marmaris in Muğla Province, with the route running along the Mediterranean coastline.

The rallies of Great Britain and Catalunya swapped places on the schedule, with Rally Catalunya becoming the penultimate round of the championship. Rallye Deutschland relocated to a new headquarters with the service park located at the Bostalsee reservoir in Saarland state.

=== Route changes ===
Rallye Monte Carlo featured a heavily revised route from the 2017 event, with half the route being brand new. After starting in Mexico City in 2017, Rally Mexico returned to its traditional start in Guanajuato. The route featured minor changes and included a new Power Stage.

The route for the Tour de Corse was heavily revised, with only two of the seven stages being run as they were in 2017. The headquarters of the event was relocated to Bastia, which hosted the event for the first time since 1978.

Organisers of the Wales Rally GB announced plans for a heavily revised route. The changes were made possible by the passage of legislation by the British government allowing public roads to be used for motorsport.

== Entries ==
=== Eligible models ===
The 2018 season saw several new car models become available for competition:

- Citroën made an R5 variation of the C3, known as the Citroën C3 R5. The Citroën DS3 R5 was still eligible to compete.
- Volkswagen entered WRC2 for the first time with the Volkswagen Polo GTI R5, the replacement for the cancelled Polo R WRC project.

=== Entry list ===
The following teams and crews were entered in the 2018 FIA WRC2 Championship:

Manufacturer	Car	Entrant	Tyre	Driver	Co-driver	Rounds
Ford	Ford Fiesta R5	(United Kingdom) M-Sport Ford WRT	M	(France) Eric Camilli	(France) Benjamin Veillas	1, 9, 11
Ford	Ford Fiesta R5	(United Kingdom) M-Sport Ford WRT	M	(Finland) Teemu Suninen	(Finland) Mikko Markkula	1
Ford	Ford Fiesta R5	(United Kingdom) M-Sport Ford WRT	M	(Bolivia) Marco Bulacia	(Argentina) Fernando Mussano	3
Ford	Ford Fiesta R5	(United Kingdom) M-Sport Ford WRT	D	(Bolivia) Marco Bulacia	(Argentina) Fernando Mussano	5
Ford	Ford Fiesta R5	(United Kingdom) M-Sport Ford WRT	D	(Spain) Nil Solans	(Spain) Miquel Ibañez	3–6
Ford	Ford Fiesta R5	(United Kingdom) M-Sport Ford WRT	P	(Spain) Nil Solans	(Spain) Miquel Ibañez	9
Ford	Ford Fiesta R5	(United Kingdom) M-Sport Ford WRT	P	(Spain) Nil Solans	(Spain) Marc Martí	11–12
Ford	Ford Fiesta R5	(United Kingdom) M-Sport Ford WRT	M	(United Kingdom) Gus Greensmith	(United Kingdom) Craig Parry	3, 5–6, 8
Ford	Ford Fiesta R5	(United Kingdom) M-Sport Ford WRT	M	(United Kingdom) Gus Greensmith	(United Kingdom) Stuart Loudon	9
Ford	Ford Fiesta R5	(United Kingdom) M-Sport Ford WRT	M	(United Kingdom) Gus Greensmith	(Italy) Alex Gelsomino	10–11
Ford	Ford Fiesta R5	(United Kingdom) M-Sport Ford WRT	M	(Chile) Pedro Heller	(Argentina) Pablo Olmos	3, 5–6, 10, 13
Ford	Ford Fiesta R5	(United Kingdom) M-Sport Ford WRT	M	(Chile) Alberto Heller	(Argentina) José Diaz	5, 13
Ford	Ford Fiesta R5	(United Kingdom) M-Sport Ford WRT	M	(Finland) Jouni Virtanen	(Finland) Enni Mälkönen	8
Ford	Ford Fiesta R5	(United Kingdom) M-Sport Ford WRT	P	(Greece) Georgios Vassilakis	(Greece) Spyros Koltsidas	10
Ford	Ford Fiesta R5	(Belgium) X-One Racing	P	(Netherlands) Kevin Abbring	(Belgium) Pieter Tsjoen	1–2, 6
Ford	Ford Fiesta R5	(Finland) Tommi Mäkinen Racing	P	(Japan) Takamoto Katsuta	(Finland) Marko Salminen	2, 6
Ford	Ford Fiesta R5	(Finland) Tommi Mäkinen Racing	M	(Japan) Takamoto Katsuta	(Finland) Marko Salminen	4, 7–8, 12
Ford	Ford Fiesta R5	(Finland) Tommi Mäkinen Racing	M	(Japan) Hiroki Arai	(Finland) Jarmo Lehtinen	7–8
Ford	Ford Fiesta R5	(Finland) Tommi Mäkinen Racing	M	(Japan) Hiroki Arai	(Australia) Glenn MacNeall	4
Ford	Ford Fiesta R5	(Finland) Tommi Mäkinen Racing	P	(Japan) Hiroki Arai	(Australia) Glenn MacNeall	2, 6
Ford	Ford Fiesta R5	(Finland) Tommi Mäkinen Racing 2	M	(Finland) Jarkko Nikara	(Japan) Sayaka Adachi	8
Ford	Ford Fiesta R5	(Russia) TAIF Motorsport	M	(Russia) Radik Shaymiev	(Russia) Maxim Tsvetkov	2
Ford	Ford Fiesta R5	(Italy) GB Motors	P	(Italy) Gianluca Linari	(Italy) Nicola Arena	2
Ford	Ford Fiesta R5	(Turkey) Castrol Ford Team Türkiye	P	(Turkey) Murat Bostanci	(Turkey) Onur Vatansever	6, 8, 10
Ford	Ford Fiesta R5	(Czech Republic) Keane Motorsport	P	(Romania) Simone Tempestini	(Romania) Sergiu Itu	6
Ford	Ford Fiesta R5	(Poland) Lotos Rally Team	P	(Poland) Kajetan Kajetanowicz	(Poland) Maciek Szczepaniak	7, 9–10, 12
Ford	Ford Fiesta R5	Ford Motorsport Turkey	P	(Turkey) Yağiz Avci	(Turkey) Ersan Alkir	10
Ford	Ford Fiesta R5	Ford Motorsport Turkey	P	(Turkey) Deniz Fahri	(Turkey) Bahadir Gücenmez	10
Ford	Ford Fiesta R5	Ford Motorsport Turkey	P	(Turkey) Bora Manyera	(Turkey) Cem Çerkez	10
Škoda Auto	Škoda Fabia R5	(Czech Republic) Škoda Motorsport II	M	(Czech Republic) Jan Kopecký	(Czech Republic) Pavel Dresler	1, 4, 7, 9–10
Škoda Auto	Škoda Fabia R5	(Czech Republic) Škoda Motorsport II	M	(Norway) Ole Christian Veiby	(Norway) Stig Rune Skjærmoen	4, 7
Škoda Auto	Škoda Fabia R5	(Czech Republic) Škoda Motorsport II	M	(Finland) Kalle Rovanperä	(Finland) Jonne Halttunen	9, 11
Škoda Auto	Škoda Fabia R5	(Czech Republic) Škoda Motorsport II	M	(Sweden) Pontus Tidemand	(Sweden) Jonas Andersson	10–11
Škoda Auto	Škoda Fabia R5	(Czech Republic) Škoda Motorsport	M	(Sweden) Pontus Tidemand	(Sweden) Jonas Andersson	2–3, 5–6
Škoda Auto	Škoda Fabia R5	(Czech Republic) Škoda Motorsport	M	(Norway) Ole Christian Veiby	(Norway) Stig Rune Skjærmoen	2, 8
Škoda Auto	Škoda Fabia R5	(Czech Republic) Škoda Motorsport	M	(Finland) Kalle Rovanperä	(Finland) Jonne Halttunen	3, 5, 8, 12
Škoda Auto	Škoda Fabia R5	(Czech Republic) Škoda Motorsport	M	(Finland) Juuso Nordgren	(Finland) Tapio Suominen	6
Škoda Auto	Škoda Fabia R5	(Czech Republic) Škoda Motorsport	M	(Czech Republic) Jan Kopecký	(Czech Republic) Pavel Dresler	12
Škoda Auto	Škoda Fabia R5	(Finland) Printsport	M	(Poland) Łukasz Pieniążek	(Poland) Przemysław Mazur	2, 4, 6–7, 9, 11–12
Škoda Auto	Škoda Fabia R5	(Finland) Printsport	M	(Finland) Emil Lindholm	(Finland) Mikael Korhonen	8
Škoda Auto	Škoda Fabia R5	(Finland) Printsport	P	(Sweden) Lars Stugemo	(Sweden) Kalle Lexe	2, 8
Škoda Auto	Škoda Fabia R5	(Italy) S.A. Motorsport Italia Srl	D	(Italy) Umberto Scandola	(Italy) Andrea Gaspari	2, 9
Škoda Auto	Škoda Fabia R5	(United Kingdom) CA1 Sport Ltd	D	(Sweden) Fredrik Åhlin	(Sweden) Joakim Sjöberg	2
Škoda Auto	Škoda Fabia R5	(Sweden) Pontus Tidemand Racing	P	(Sweden) Mattias Adielsson	(Sweden) Andreas Johansson	2
Škoda Auto	Škoda Fabia R5	(Germany) Toksport World Rally Team	P	(Finland) Janne Tuohino	(Finland) Reeta Hämäläinen	2
Škoda Auto	Škoda Fabia R5	(Germany) Toksport World Rally Team	P	(Finland) Jarmo Berg	(Finland) Rami Suorsa	2
Škoda Auto	Škoda Fabia R5	(Germany) Toksport World Rally Team	M	(United Kingdom) Chris Ingram	(United Kingdom) Ross Whittock	10–11
Škoda Auto	Škoda Fabia R5	(Germany) Toksport World Rally Team	M	(Norway) Henning Solberg	(Austria) Ilka Minor	12
Škoda Auto	Škoda Fabia R5	(Germany) Toksport World Rally Team	M	(United Kingdom) Rhys Yates	(United Kingdom) Elliott Edmondson	12
Škoda Auto	Škoda Fabia R5	(Italy) Motorsport Italia	P	(Mexico) Benito Guerra	(Spain) Borja Rozada	3, 6–9
Škoda Auto	Škoda Fabia R5	(Italy) Motorsport Italia	P	(Mexico) Benito Guerra	(Italy) Emanuele Inglesi	12
Škoda Auto	Škoda Fabia R5	(Italy) Motorsport Italia	P	(Portugal) Diogo Salvi	(Portugal) Hugo Magalhães	10
Škoda Auto	Škoda Fabia R5	(Italy) Motorsport Italia	P	(Germany) Armin Kremer	(Germany) Pirmin Winklhofer	13
Škoda Auto	Škoda Fabia R5	(Italy) ACI Team Italia WRC	P	(Italy) Fabio Andolfi	(Italy) Simone Scattolin	4, 6, 12
Škoda Auto	Škoda Fabia R5	(Italy) ACI Team Italia WRC	P	(Italy) Fabio Andolfi	(Italy) Emanuele Inglesi	8–9, 11
Škoda Auto	Škoda Fabia R5	(Paraguay) Saba Competición	D	(Paraguay) Gustavo Saba	(Argentina) Marcelo der Ohannesian	5
Škoda Auto	Škoda Fabia R5	(Paraguay) ABR World Rally Team	D	(Paraguay) Tiago Weiler	(Argentina) Fabian Cretu	5
Škoda Auto	Škoda Fabia R5	(Finland) TGS Worldwide	M	(Finland) Eerik Pietarinen	(Finland) Juhana Raitanen	8
Škoda Auto	Škoda Fabia R5	(Germany) Škoda Auto Deutschland	M	(Germany) Fabian Kreim	(Germany) Frank Christian	9
Škoda Auto	Škoda Fabia R5	(Turkey) BC Vision Motorsport	M	(Turkey) Burak Çukurova	(Turkey) Vedat Bostanci	10
Škoda Auto	Škoda Fabia R5	(Turkey) BC Vision Motorsport	P	(Turkey) Erkan Güral	(Turkey) Burak Koçoğlu	10
Škoda Auto	Škoda Fabia R5	(Spain) Race Seven	D	(Bolivia) Marco Bulacia	(Argentina) Fabian Cretu	11–12
Škoda Auto	Škoda Fabia R5	(France) 2C Competition	M	(France) Sylvain Michel	(France) Anthony Gorguilo	12
Peugeot	Peugeot 208 T16 R5	Peugeot Belgium Luxembourg	M	(Belgium) Guillaume De Mévius	(Belgium) Louis Louka	1, 4
Citroën	Citroën DS3 R5	(France) PH Sport	M	(Italy) Eddie Sciessere	(Italy) Flavio Zanella	1
Citroën	Citroën C3 R5	(France) PH Sport	M	(Norway) Ole Christian Veiby	(Norway) Stig Rune Skjærmoen	11
Citroën	Citroën C3 R5	(France) Citroën Total	M	(France) Stéphane Lefebvre	(France) Gabin Moreau	4, 6–9, 11–12
Citroën	Citroën C3 R5	(France) Citroën Total	M	(Romania) Simone Tempestini	(Romania) Sergiu Itu	7–12
Citroën	Citroën C3 R5	(France) Citroën Total	M	(Norway) Ole Christian Veiby	(Norway) Stig Rune Skjærmoen	12
Citroën	Citroën C3 R5	(France) CHL Sport Auto	M	(France) Yoann Bonato	(France) Benjamin Boulloud	4, 9
Citroën	Citroën C3 R5	(Portugal) Sports & You	M	(Spain) Pepe López	(Spain) Borja Rozada	12
Hyundai	Hyundai i20 R5	(South Korea) Hyundai Motorsport	M	(Finland) Jari Huttunen	(Finland) Antti Linnaketo	2–3, 6, 8–9, 11–12
Hyundai	Hyundai i20 R5	(South Korea) Hyundai Motorsport	M	(France) Nicolas Ciamin	(France) Thibault de la Haye	4, 7–9
Hyundai	Hyundai i20 R5	(South Korea) Hyundai Motorsport	M	(Finland) Max Vatanen	(France) Christopher Guieu	6
Hyundai	Hyundai i20 R5	(Italy) BRC Racing Team	M	(France) Pierre-Louis Loubet	(France) Vincent Landais	4, 6–9, 11–12
Hyundai	Hyundai i20 R5	Hyundai Paraguay	D	(Paraguay) Diego Dominguez	(Argentina) Edgardo Galindo	5
Hyundai	Hyundai i20 R5	(Italy) Metior Sport	M	(Italy) Eddie Sciessere	(Italy) Pietro Ometto	9
Hyundai	Hyundai i20 R5	(Spain) Hyundai Motor España	M	(Spain) José Antonio Suárez	(Spain) Cándido Carrera	9, 12
Volkswagen	Volkswagen Polo GTI R5	(Germany) Volkswagen Motorsport	M	(France) Eric Camilli	(France) Benjamin Veillas	12
Volkswagen	Volkswagen Polo GTI R5	(Germany) Volkswagen Motorsport	M	(Norway) Petter Solberg	(Norway) Veronica Engan	12
Subaru	Subaru Impreza WRX STi	(Italy) GB Motors	P	(Italy) Gianluca Linari	(Italy) Pietro Ometto	13

== Results and standings ==
=== Season summary ===
Round	Event	Winning driver	Winning co-driver	Winning entrant	Winning time	Report
1	(Monaco) Rallye Monte Carlo	(Czech Republic) Jan Kopecký	(Czech Republic) Pavel Dresler	(Czech Republic) Škoda Motorsport II	4:35:38.5	Report
2	Rally Sweden	(Japan) Takamoto Katsuta	(Finland) Marko Salminen	(Finland) Tommi Mäkinen Racing	3:01:27.5	Report
3	(Mexico) Rally México	(Sweden) Pontus Tidemand	(Sweden) Jonas Andersson	(Czech Republic) Škoda Motorsport	4:04:32.7	Report
4	(France) Tour de Corse	(Czech Republic) Jan Kopecký	(Czech Republic) Pavel Dresler	(Czech Republic) Škoda Motorsport II	3:37:27.5	Report
5	Rally Argentina	(Sweden) Pontus Tidemand	(Sweden) Jonas Andersson	(Czech Republic) Škoda Motorsport	3:55:44.7	Report
6	Rally Portugal	(Sweden) Pontus Tidemand	(Sweden) Jonas Andersson	(Czech Republic) Škoda Motorsport	4:03:57.4	Report
7	(Italy) Rally Italia Sardegna	(Czech Republic) Jan Kopecký	(Czech Republic) Pavel Dresler	(Czech Republic) Škoda Motorsport II	3:42:33.3	Report
8	Rally Finland	(Finland) Eerik Pietarinen	(Finland) Juhana Raitanen	(Finland) TGS Worldwide OU	2:45:18.4	Report
9	(Germany) Rallye Deutschland	(Czech Republic) Jan Kopecký	(Czech Republic) Pavel Dresler	(Czech Republic) Škoda Motorsport II	3:16:49.7	Report
10	Rally Turkey	(Czech Republic) Jan Kopecký	(Czech Republic) Pavel Dresler	(Czech Republic) Škoda Motorsport II	4:17:49.7	Report
11	(United Kingdom) Wales Rally GB	(Finland) Kalle Rovanperä	(Finland) Jonne Halttunen	(Czech Republic) Škoda Motorsport II	3:15:27.2	Report
12	(Spain) Rally Catalunya	(Finland) Kalle Rovanperä	(Finland) Jonne Halttunen	(Czech Republic) Škoda Motorsport	3:20:47.6	Report
13	Rally Australia	(Chile) Alberto Heller	(Argentina) José Diaz	(United Kingdom) M-Sport Ford WRT	3:22:20.5	Report

=== Scoring system ===
Points were awarded to the top ten classified finishers in each event. Six best results counted towards championship.

Position	1st	2nd	3rd	4th	5th	6th	7th	8th	9th	10th
Points	25	18	15	12	10	8	6	4	2	1

=== FIA WRC2 Championship for Drivers ===
Pos.	Driver	MON (Monaco)	SWE (Sweden)	MEX (Mexico)	FRA (France)	ARG (Argentina)	POR (Portugal)	ITA (Italy)	FIN (Finland)	DEU (Germany)	TUR (Turkey)	GBR (United Kingdom)	CAT (Spain)	AUS (Australia)	Drops	Points
1	(Czech Republic) Jan Kopecký	1			1			1		1	1		2		0	143
2	(Sweden) Pontus Tidemand		2	1		1	1				Ret	2			0	111
3	(Finland) Kalle Rovanperä			5		Ret			4	2		1	1		0	90
4	(United Kingdom) Gus Greensmith			2		2	8		3	Ret	Ret	3			0	70
5	(Poland) Łukasz Pieniążek		9		5		2	5		6		6	16		0	56
6	(Italy) Fabio Andolfi				3		15	4	8	3		8	8		0	54
7	(Norway) Ole Christian Veiby		3		4			2	Ret			11	9		0	47
8	(Finland) Jari Huttunen		6	6			12		2	12		4	11		0	46
9	(Chile) Pedro Heller			3		3	10				5			Ret	0	41
10	(Poland) Kajetan Kajetanowicz							7		5	4		4		0	40
11	(France) Pierre-Louis Loubet				6		4	Ret	5	Ret		Ret	7		0	36
12	(Spain) Nil Solans			7	7	5	9			Ret		13	5		0	34
13	(France) Stéphane Lefebvre				Ret		3	8	13	8		5	15		0	33
14	(Japan) Takamoto Katsuta		1		8		13	Ret	Ret				12		0	29
15	(Romania) Simone Tempestini						16	Ret	9	10	2	7	10		0	28
16	(Finland) Eerik Pietarinen								1						0	25
17	(Chile) Alberto Heller					Ret								1	0	25
18	(Japan) Hiroki Arai		7		9		5	Ret	7						0	24
19	(Mexico) Benito Guerra			DNS			7	6	6	9					0	24
20	(France) Nicolas Ciamin				Ret			3	Ret	7					0	21
21	(France) Yoann Bonato				2					11					0	18
22	(Italy) Gianluca Linari		12											2	0	18
23	(Italy) Eddie Sciessere	2								WD					0	18
24	(United Kingdom) Chris Ingram										3	12			0	15
25	(Finland) Teemu Suninen	3													0	15
26	(Norway) Petter Solberg												3		0	15
27	(Bolivia) Marco Bulacia			4		Ret						9	18		0	14
28	(Belgium) Guillaume De Mévius	4			WD										0	12
29	(Sweden) Mattias Adielsson		4												0	12
30	(Paraguay) Diego Dominguez					4									0	12
31	(Germany) Fabian Kreim									4					0	12
32	(Finland) Janne Tuohino		5												0	10
33	(Finland) Juuso Nordgren						6								0	8
34	(Turkey) Burak Cukurova										6				0	8
35	(Norway) Henning Solberg												6		0	8
36	(Portugal) Diogo Salvi										7				0	6
37	(Sweden) Lars Stugemo		8						12						0	4
38	(Turkey) Bora Manyera										8				0	4
39	(Turkey) Erkan Güral										9				0	2
40	(Turkey) Murat Bostanci						11		10		Ret				0	1
41	(France) Eric Camilli	Ret								Ret		10	17		0	1
42	(Finland) Jarmo Berg		10												0	1
43	(Greece) Georgios Vassilakis										10				0	1
Pos.	Driver	MON (Monaco)	SWE (Sweden)	MEX (Mexico)	FRA (France)	ARG (Argentina)	POR (Portugal)	ITA (Italy)	FIN (Finland)	DEU (Germany)	TUR (Turkey)	GBR (United Kingdom)	CAT (Spain)	AUS (Australia)	Drops	Points

Key
Colour	Result
Gold	Winner
Silver	2nd place
Bronze	3rd place
Green	Points finish
Blue	Non-points finish
Blue	Non-classified finish (NC)
Purple	Did not finish (Ret)
Black	Excluded (EX)
Black	Disqualified (DSQ)
White	Did not start (DNS)
White	Cancelled (C)
Blank	Withdrew entry from the event (WD)

=== FIA WRC2 Championship for Co-Drivers ===
Pos.	Driver	MON (Monaco)	SWE (Sweden)	MEX (Mexico)	FRA (France)	ARG (Argentina)	POR (Portugal)	ITA (Italy)	FIN (Finland)	DEU (Germany)	TUR (Turkey)	GBR (United Kingdom)	CAT (Spain)	AUS (Australia)	Drops	Points
1	(Czech Republic) Pavel Dresler	1			1			1		1	1		2		0	143
2	(Sweden) Jonas Andersson		2	1		1	1				Ret	2			0	111
3	(Finland) Jonne Halttunen			5		Ret			4	2		1	1		0	90
4	(Poland) Przemysław Mazur		9		5		2	5		6		6	16		0	56
5	(United Kingdom) Craig Parry			2		2	8		3						0	55
6	(Norway) Stig Rune Skjærmoen		3		4			2	Ret			11	9		0	47
7	(Finland) Antti Linnaketo		6	6			12		2	12		4	11		0	46
8	(Argentina) Pablo Olmos			3		3	10				5			Ret	0	41
9	(Poland) Maciek Szczepaniak							7		5	4		4		0	40
10	(France) Vincent Landais				6		4	Ret	5	Ret		Ret	7		0	36
11	(France) Gabin Moreau				Ret		3	8	13	8		5	15		0	33
12	(Italy) Simone Scattolin				3		15	4					8		0	31
13	(Finland) Marko Salminen		1		8		13	Ret	Ret				12		0	29
14	(Romania) Sergiu Itu						16	Ret	9	10	2	7	10		0	28
15	(Finland) Juhana Raitanen								1						0	25
16	(Argentina) José Díaz					Ret								1	0	25
17	(Spain) Miquel Ibañez			7	7	5	9			Ret					0	24
18	(Spain) Borja Rozada			WD			7	6	6	9					0	24
19	(Italy) Emanuele Inglesi								8	3		8			0	23
20	(France) Thibault de la Haye				Ret			3	Ret	7					0	21
21	(France) Benjamin Boulloud				2					11					0	18
22	(Italy) Flavio Zanella	2													0	18
23	(Italy) Pietro Elia Ometto													2	0	18
24	(Australia) Glenn MacNeall		7		9		5								0	18
25	(United Kingdom) Ross Whittock										3	12			0	15
26	(Finland) Mikko Markkula	3													0	15
27	(Italy) Alex Gelsomino										Ret	3			0	15
28	(Norway) Veronica Engan												3		0	15
29	(Argentina) Fernando Mussano			4		Ret									0	12
30	(Belgium) Louis Louka	4			WD										0	12
31	(Sweden) Andreas Johansson		4												0	12
32	(Argentina) Edgardo Galindo					4									0	12
33	(Germany) Frank Christian									4					0	12
34	(Spain) Marc Martí											13	5		0	10
35	(Finland) Reeta Hämäläinen		5												0	10
36	(Finland) Tapio Suominen						6								0	8
37	(Turkey) Vedat Bostanci										6				0	8
38	(Austria) Ilka Minor												6		0	8
39	(Portugal) Hugo Magalhães										7				0	6
40	(Finland) Jarmo Lehtinen							Ret	7						0	6
41	(Sweden) Kalle Lexe		8						12						0	4
42	(Turkey) Cem Cerkez										8				0	4
43	(Argentina) Fabian Cretu					Ret						9	18		0	2
44	(Turkey) Burak Koçoğlu										9				0	2
45	(Turkey) Onur Vatansever						11		10		Ret				0	1
46	(France) Benjamin Veillas	Ret								Ret		10	17		0	1
47	(Finland) Rami Suorsa		10												0	1
48	(Greece) Spiros Koltsidas										10				0	1
Pos.	Driver	MON (Monaco)	SWE (Sweden)	MEX (Mexico)	FRA (France)	ARG (Argentina)	POR (Portugal)	ITA (Italy)	FIN (Finland)	DEU (Germany)	TUR (Turkey)	GBR (United Kingdom)	CAT (Spain)	AUS (Australia)	Drops	Points

Key
Colour	Result
Gold	Winner
Silver	2nd place
Bronze	3rd place
Green	Points finish
Blue	Non-points finish
Blue	Non-classified finish (NC)
Purple	Did not finish (Ret)
Black	Excluded (EX)
Black	Disqualified (DSQ)
White	Did not start (DNS)
White	Cancelled (C)
Blank	Withdrew entry from the event (WD)

=== FIA WRC2 Championship for Teams ===
Pos.	Team	MON (Monaco)	SWE (Sweden)	MEX (Mexico)	FRA (France)	ARG (Argentina)	POR (Portugal)	ITA (Italy)	FIN (Finland)	DEU (Germany)	TUR (Turkey)	GBR (United Kingdom)	CAT (Spain)	AUS (Australia)	Points
1	(Czech Republic) Škoda Motorsport II	1			1			1		1	1	1			150
2	(Czech Republic) Škoda Motorsport		2	1		1	1		3				1		133
3	(Finland) Printsport		5		3		2	3	10	5		4	11		81
4	(Italy) ACI Team Italia WRC				2		9	2	7	2		5	6		80
5	(South Korea) Hyundai Motorsport		4	2			8		2	9		2	8		76
6	(France) Citroën Total Rallye Team				Ret		3	6	8	6		3	7		56
7	(Finland) Tommi Mäkinen Racing		1		5		5	Ret	6				9		55
8	(Poland) Lotos Rally Team							5		4	3		3		52
9	(United Kingdom) M-Sport Ford WRT	2				Ret			11	Ret		6		1	51
10	(Germany) Toksport World Rally Team		3								2	8	4		49
11	(Italy) BRC Racing Team				4		4	Ret	4	Ret		Ret	5		46
12	(Italy) Motorsport Italia			WD			6	4	5		5			Ret	40
13	(Finland) TGS Worldwide OU								1						25
14	(Germany) Volkswagen Motorsport												2		18
15	(Germany) Škoda Auto Deutschland									3					15
16	(Italy) S.A. Motorsport Italia Srl		6							7					14
17	(Turkey) BC Vision Motorsport										4				12
18	(Turkey) Castrol Ford Team Türkiye						7		9		Ret				8
19	(France) PH Sport											7			6
20	(France) CHL Sport Auto									8					4
21	(Portugal) Sports&you												10		1
Pos.	Driver	MON (Monaco)	SWE (Sweden)	MEX (Mexico)	FRA (France)	ARG (Argentina)	POR (Portugal)	ITA (Italy)	FIN (Finland)	DEU (Germany)	TUR (Turkey)	GBR (United Kingdom)	CAT (Spain)	AUS (Australia)	Points

Key
Colour	Result
Gold	Winner
Silver	2nd place
Bronze	3rd place
Green	Points finish
Blue	Non-points finish
Blue	Non-classified finish (NC)
Purple	Did not finish (Ret)
Black	Excluded (EX)
Black	Disqualified (DSQ)
White	Did not start (DNS)
White	Cancelled (C)
Blank	Withdrew entry from the event (WD)
