= Gerard Oliva =

Spanish footballer (born 1989)

Personal information
- Full name: Gerard Oliva Gorgori
- Date of birth: 7 October 1989 (age 37)
- Place of birth: Riudecanyes, Spain
- Height: 1.90 m (6 ft 3 in)
- Position: Forward

Team information
- Current team: Sant Andreu
- Number: 10

Youth career
- 2002–2005: Santes Creus
- 2005–2007: Gimnàstic
- 2007–2008: Reus
- 2009: Catania

Senior career*
Years	Team	Apps	(Gls)
2008	Logroñés	10	(1)
2009–2011	Numancia B	43	(21)
2010–2011	Numancia	3	(0)
2011–2013	Atlético Madrid B	61	(19)
2013–2014	Huesca	8	(0)
2014	Ried	15	(1)
2014–2015	Murcia	35	(3)
2015	Compostela	13	(1)
2016	Hospitalet	14	(2)
2016–2017	Badalona	34	(18)
2017–2018	Atlético Baleares	19	(5)
2018	UCAM Murcia	14	(2)
2018–2019	Cracovia	3	(1)
2019–2021	Gimnàstic	39	(7)
2021–2023	Linense	65	(7)
2023	San Fernando	7	(0)
2024–	Sant Andreu	22	(2)
- * Club domestic league appearances and goals as of 7 October 2024

Gerard Oliva Gorgori (born 7 October 1989) is a Spanish professional footballer who plays for Sant Andreu as a forward.

== Club career ==
Born in Riudecanyes, Tarragona, Catalonia, Oliva started his youth career in local UE Barri Santes Creus and Gimnàstic de Tarragona, and after a brief period with neighbouring CF Reus Deportiu, he made his senior debuts with CD Logroñés in the 2008–09 season, in Tercera División; however, he left the club in the following transfer window, due to financial problems.

In January 2009, Oliva moved abroad and joined Italian side Calcio Catania, being assigned to the Primavera squad. In July, he returned to his country, signing with CD Numancia and being assigned to the reserves in the fourth level. On 4 December of the following year, Oliva made his professional debut, playing the last 26 minutes of a 1–2 home loss against Real Betis, in the Segunda División championship.

On 21 June 2011, Oliva signed with another reserve team, Atlético Madrid B, in Segunda División B. Two seasons later, he joined SD Huesca, freshly relegated to the third level.

On 17 January 2014, it was confirmed that Oliva signed a six-month deal with Austrian Bundesliga side SV Josko Ried. He scored the winning goal in his first game for Ried in a 2–1 home victory over SC Wiener Neustadt on 8 February 2014.

On 27 August 2014, Oliva returned to his country, signing a one-year deal with Real Murcia in the third level. He continued to appear in that tier in the following years, representing SD Compostela, CE L'Hospitalet, CF Badalona, CD Atlético Baleares, Gimnàstic de Tarragona and Real Balompédica Linense, the latter in the new division called Primera División RFEF.
