= Riudecanyes =

- Municipality
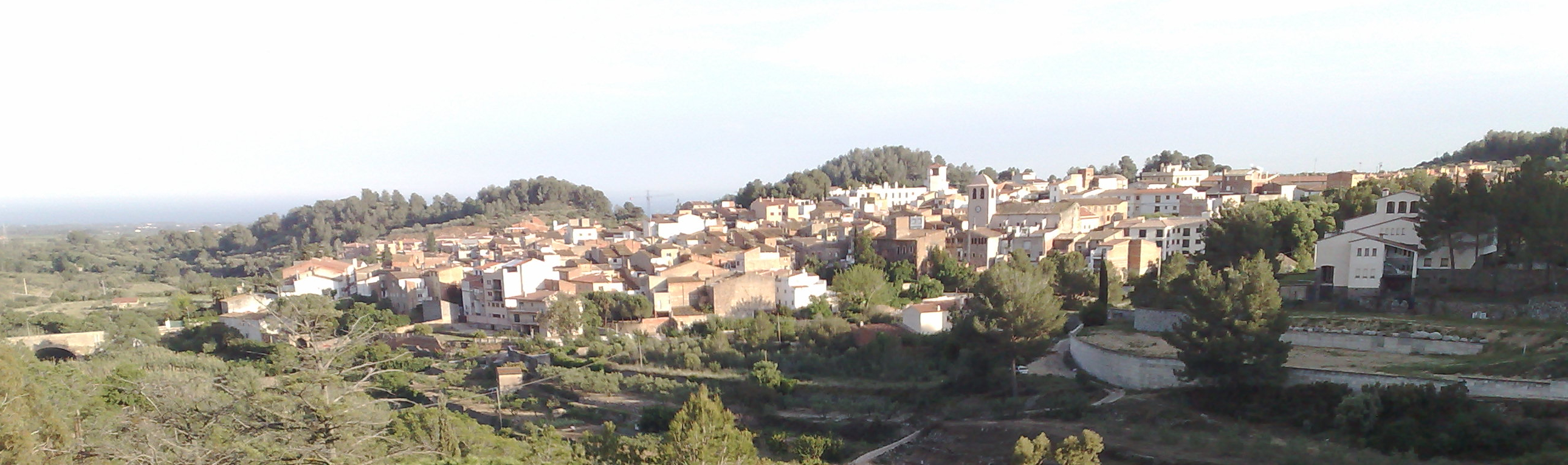
- Riudecanyes

- Coat of arms

- Location in Catalonia
- Coordinates: 41°7′50″N 0°57′45″E
- Country: Spain
- Community: Catalonia
- Province: Tarragona
- Comarca: Baix Camp

Government
  - Mayor: Josep Maria Tost Borràs (2015)

Area
  - Total: 17.1 km^{2} (6.6 sq mi)

Population (2025-01-01)
  - Total: 1,362
  - Density: 79.6/km^{2} (206/sq mi)
- Website: www.riudecanyes.cat

Riudecanyes (Catalan pronunciation: [ˌriwðəˈkaɲəs]) is a village in the province of Tarragona and autonomous community of Catalonia, Spain. It has a population of 1,362 (register office, 2025). It's land area is 17.1km, and surrounding villages are: Botarell, Montbrio Del Camp, Montroig Del Camp, Villanova d'Escornalbou, and Duesaigues. Riudecanyes has a reservoir, which was built in 1902 by Gaieta Ubeda i Sarachaga, which overlooks the small village. There's also sometimes races happening here, called the Cursa Del Gall.
