= Przemysław Mazur =

Polish rally codriver (born 1978)

Przemyslaw Mazur
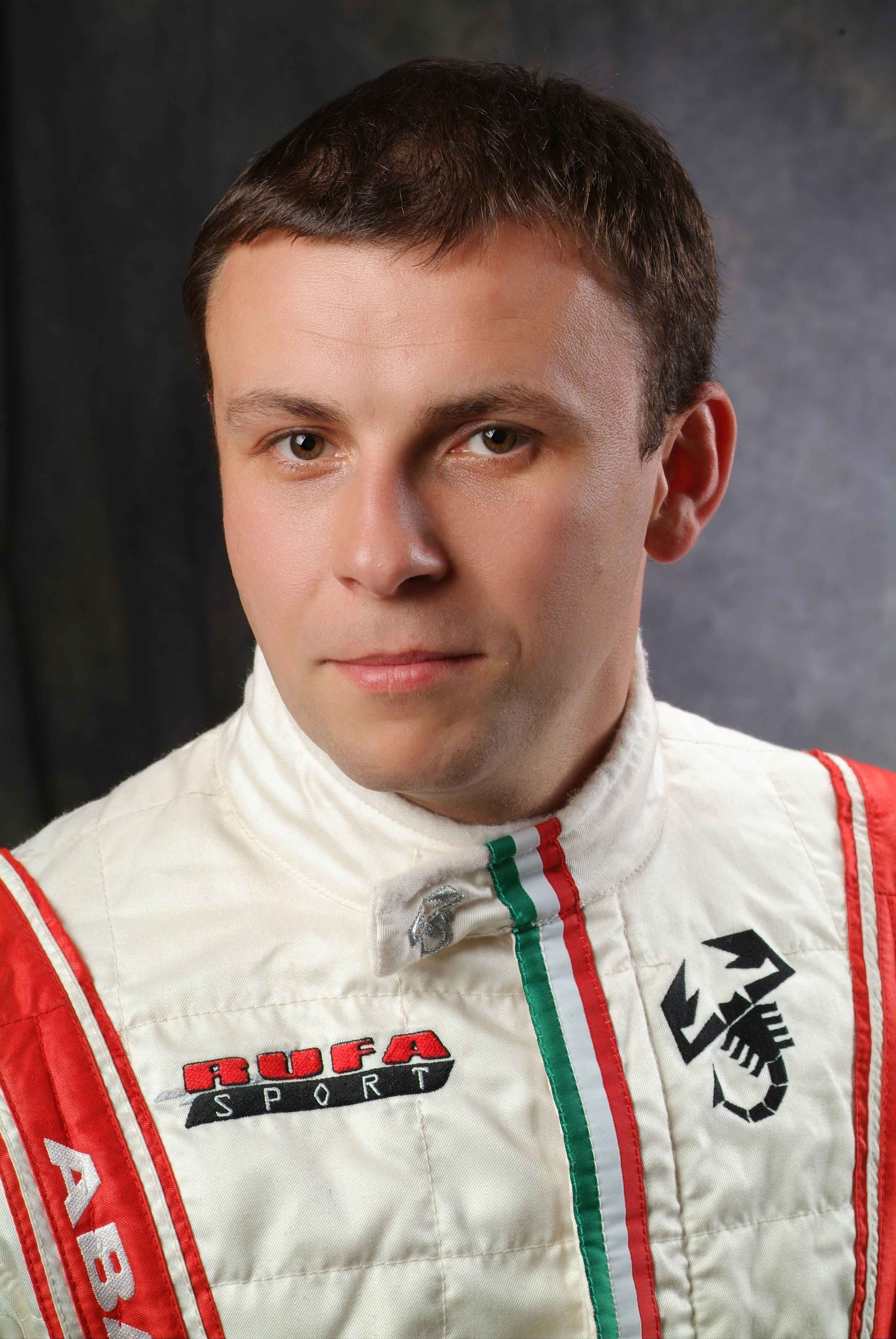
- Nationality: Poland
- Born: 23 May 1978 (age 48) Kraków, Poland
- Debut season: 1997
- Starts: 103 customized at 04-02-2012

Przemysław Mazur (born 23 May 1978) is a Polish rally codriver.

== Biography ==
Mazur was born on 23 May 1978 in Kraków, Poland. One of the most experienced rally codrivers in Poland. His Rally career he began in 1998 and since the end of 2011 he has started in more than 100 rallies counted to the Polish Rally Championship and the European Rally Championship. Over the years, he finished successful many rallies with different drivers: Grzegorz Grzyb, Maciej Lubiak, Leszek Kuzaj and now Maciej Rzeznik. During the rally career has started following cars:

- WRC class: Citroen Xsara WRC, Citroen C4 WRC, Skoda Fabia WRC
- S2000 class: Fiat Grande Punto S2000, Skoda Fabia S2000, S2000 Peugeot 207
- N4/R4 class: Mitsubishi Lancer Evo IX, Mitsubishi Lancer Evo X
- S1600 class: Peugeot 206 S1600, Suzuki Ignis S1600

Mazur lent his voice as a co-driver in a computer game "Rally Poland" issued by IQ Publishing.

== Rally career ==
- 2013

Vice-champion of Polish Rally Championship Overall Classification
Vice-champion of Polish Rally Championship Class 2 Classification

- 2011

Vice-champion of Central Europe Zone S2000 Classification

- 2010

2nd Vice-champion of Slovakia S2000 Classification

- 2009

Vice-champion of Slovakia Overall Classification

- 2008

2nd Vice-champion of Central Europe Zone
2nd Vice-champion of Slovakia Overall Classification
Vice-champion of Slovakia N4 class

- 2007

Fiat-Castrol Rally Team codriver

- 2005

Vice-champion of Slovakia Overall Classification
Vice-champion of Slovakia S1600 Classification

- 2004

Champion of Poland in S1600 classification

- 2003

Champion of Poland in S1600 classification

- 2000

Vice-champion of Poland in Peugeot 106 Rallye Cup

== Mountain career ==
He has already climbed following Seven Summits series mountains:

- Mont Blanc (4810 metres above sea level, Alps)
- Elbrus (5642 metres above sea level, Caucasus)
- Aconcagua (6962 metres above sea level, Andes)
- Kilimanjaro (5895 metres above sea level, Kilimanjaro)

== Education ==
Higher Education: Polish Open University. Title of qualification awarded: MBA by Oxford Brookes University
