= 2018 Wales Rally GB =

Rally car race

2018 Wales Rally GB: 74. Dayinsure Wales Rally GB
Round 11 of 13 in the 2018 World Rally Championship
← Previous event	Next event →
- Host country: United Kingdom
- Rally base: Deeside, Flintshire
- Dates run: 4 – 7 October 2018
- Start location: Tir Prince Raceway
- Finish location: Llandudno Promenade
- Stages: 23 (318.34 km; 197.81 miles)
- Stage surface: Gravel (Note: Although some stages contain tarmac sections, the rally is classified as a gravel event and tyre suppliers only provide crews with gravel-specification tyres.)
- Transport distance: 1,083.01 km (672.95 miles)
- Overall distance: 1,401.35 km (870.76 miles)

Statistics
- Crews registered: 60
- Crews: 57 at start, 48 at finish

Overall results
- Overall winner: (France) Sébastien Ogier (France) Julien Ingrassia (United Kingdom) M-Sport Ford WRT; 3:06:12.5
- Power Stage winner: (Finland) Jari-Matti Latvala (Finland) Miikka Anttila (Japan) Toyota Gazoo Racing WRT

Support category results
- WRC-2 winner: (Finland) Kalle Rovanperä (Finland) Jonne Halttunen (Czech Republic) Škoda Motorsport II; 3:15:27.2
- WRC-3 winner: (United Kingdom) Tom Williams (United Kingdom) Phil Hall (United Kingdom) Tom Williams; 3:49:44.9

The 2018 Wales Rally GB (formally known as the 74. Dayinsure Wales Rally GB) was a motor racing event for rally cars that took place over four days from 4 to 7 October 2018. The event was open to entries competing in World Rally Cars and cars complying with Group R regulations. It marked the seventy-fourth running of Rally Great Britain and was the eleventh round of the 2018 FIA World Rally Championship, the highest class of competition in international rallying. Sixty crews, including manufacturer teams and privateers, were entered to compete in the World Rally Championship, the FIA World Rally Championship-2 and FIA World Rally Championship-3 support series and the MSA British Rally Championship. (Note: The first leg of the rally formed the penultimate round of the British national championship and the second leg was the final round. The third leg did not count towards the championship.) The 2018 event was based in Deeside in Flintshire and consisted of twenty-three special stages throughout North and Mid-Wales. The rally covered a total competitive distance of 318.34 km (197.81 miles) and an additional 1,083.01 km (672.95 miles) in transport stages.

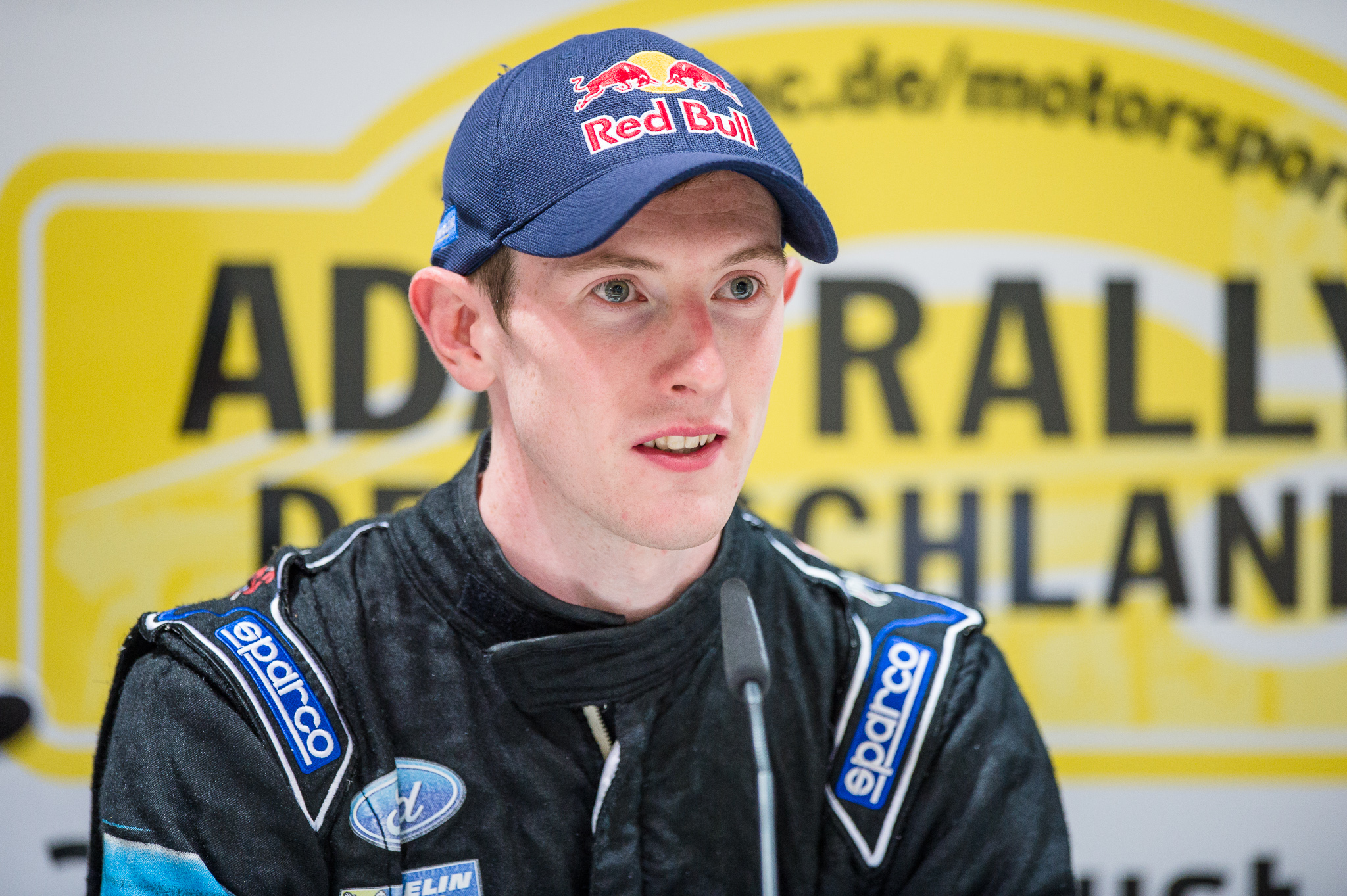
Elfyn Evans was the defending rally winner.

The M-Sport Ford World Rally Team crew of Elfyn Evans and Daniel Barritt were the defending rally winners. Pontus Tidemand and Jonas Andersson of Škoda Motorsport were the defending winners of the World Rally Championship-2, and French privateers Raphaël Astier and Frédéric Vauclare were the reigning winners in the World Rally Championship-3 category; however, Astier and Vauclare did not defend their title as they did not enter the rally.

The rally was won by Sébastien Ogier and Julien Ingrassia. The result marked their fifth win in Wales and saw them become the most successful crew in the history of the event. Ogier and Ingrassia moved to within seven points of championship leaders Thierry Neuville and Nicolas Gilsoul. Toyota's Jari-Matti Latvala and Miikka Anttila finished second, with their teammates Esapekka Lappi and Janne Ferm completing the podium. M-Sport Ford World Rally Team were the manufacturers' winners, whilst Toyota Gazoo Racing WRT extended their lead in the manufacturers' championship. The Škoda Motorsport II crew of Kalle Rovanperä and Jonne Halttunen won in the World Rally Championship-2 in a Škoda Fabia R5, while the local crew of Tom Williams and Phil Hall won in the World Rally Championship-3.

== Background ==
=== Championship standings prior to the event ===
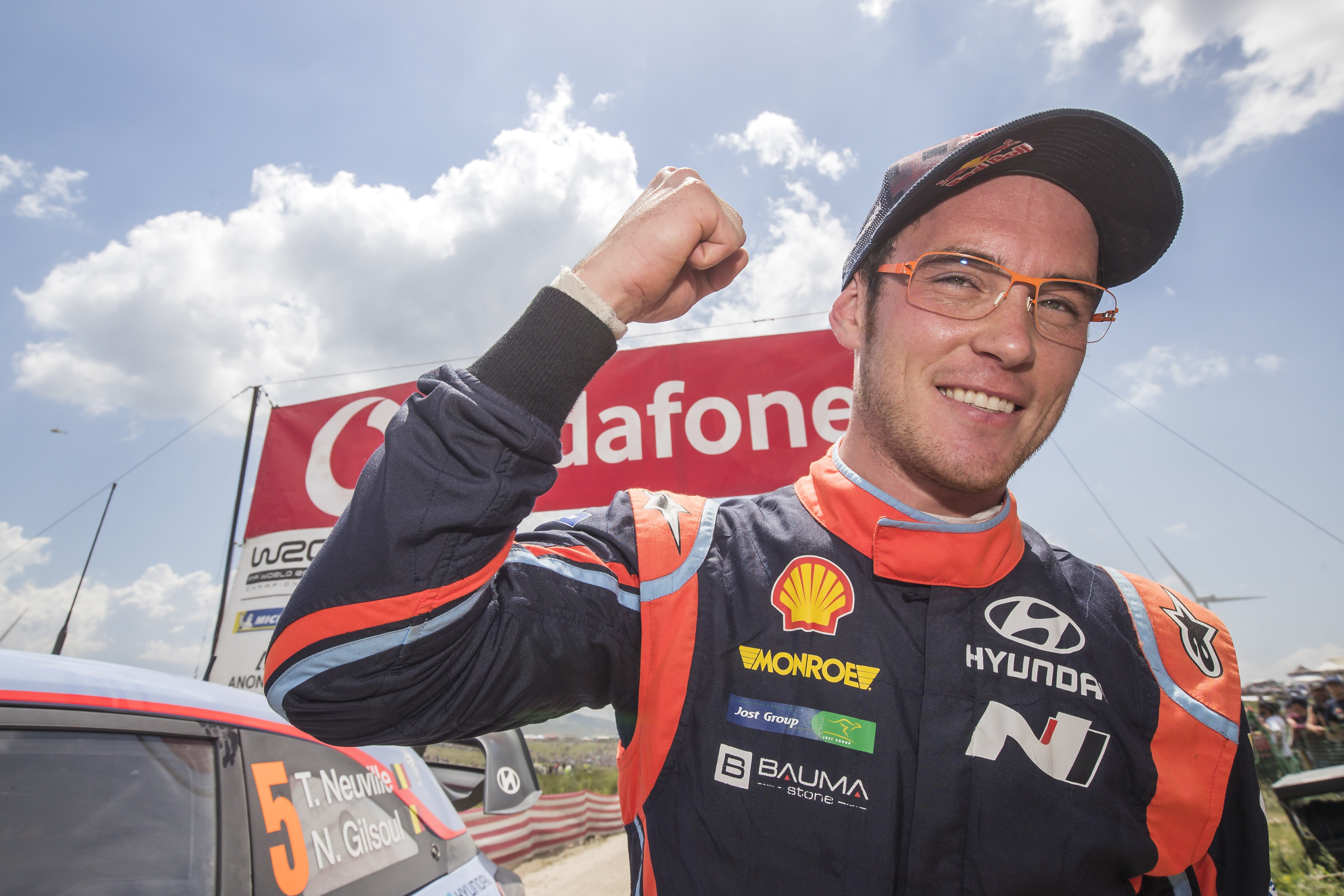
Hyundai's Thierry Neuville entered the round as the drivers' championship leader.

Thierry Neuville and Nicolas Gilsoul entered the round as the leaders of the World Rally Championship for Drivers and the World Rally Championship for Co-Drivers respectively. They held a thirteen-point lead over Ott Tänak and Martin Järveoja. Defending World Champions Sébastien Ogier and Julien Ingrassia were third, a further ten points behind. In the World Rally Championship for Manufacturers, Toyota Gazoo Racing WRT held a five-point lead over Hyundai Shell Mobis WRT.

In the World Rally Championship-2 standings, Jan Kopecký and Pavel Dresler led the drivers' and co-drivers' standings by thirty-two points, but did not contest the rally. Pontus Tidemand and Jonas Andersson were in second place, thirty-eight points ahead of privateers Gus Greensmith and Craig Parry. Škoda Motorsport II held a seventeen-point lead over sister team Škoda Motorsport in the teams' championship.

Newly crowned Junior World Rally Champion Emil Bergkvist led the World Rally Championship-3 drivers' standings. Denis Rådström was second, six points behind Bergkvist and Jean-Baptiste Franceschi third; Franceschi entered the rally, but did not nominate it as a round to score points. Johan Johansson held a one-point lead over Romain Courbon in the co-drivers' standings, while Tatu Hämäläinen was another eleven points behind. In the teams' championship, ACI Team Italia led Castrol Ford Team Turkiye by sixteen points.

=== Entry list ===
The following crews were entered into the rally. The entry list consisted of sixty crews, including eleven World Rally Car entries, fourteen entries in the World Rally Championship-2, four in the World Rally Championship-3 and nineteen in the British national championship.

No.	Entrant	Driver	Co-Driver	Car	Group	Eligibility (Note: Competitors competing in national events are variously eligible to score points in the British National, British Junior, British Cadet, British Ladies and British 2WD championships.)	Tyre
0	—N/a	(United Kingdom) Stuart Egglestone	(United Kingdom) Paul Morris	Subaru Impreza STi N12	—N/a	Course car	—N/a
1	(United Kingdom) M-Sport Ford WRT	(France) Sébastien Ogier	(France) Julien Ingrassia	Ford Fiesta WRC	RC1	WRC manufacturer	M
2	(United Kingdom) M-Sport Ford WRT	(United Kingdom) Elfyn Evans	(United Kingdom) Daniel Barritt	Ford Fiesta WRC	RC1	WRC manufacturer	M
3	(United Kingdom) M-Sport Ford WRT	(Finland) Teemu Suninen	(Finland) Mikko Markkula	Ford Fiesta WRC	RC1	WRC manufacturer	M
4	(South Korea) Hyundai Shell Mobis WRT	(Norway) Andreas Mikkelsen	(Norway) Anders Jæger-Synnevaag	Hyundai i20 Coupe WRC	RC1	WRC manufacturer	M
5	(South Korea) Hyundai Shell Mobis WRT	(Belgium) Thierry Neuville	(Belgium) Nicolas Gilsoul	Hyundai i20 Coupe WRC	RC1	WRC manufacturer	M
6	(South Korea) Hyundai Shell Mobis WRT	(New Zealand) Hayden Paddon	(United Kingdom) Sebastian Marshall	Hyundai i20 Coupe WRC	RC1	WRC manufacturer	M
7	(Japan) Toyota Gazoo Racing WRT	(Finland) Jari-Matti Latvala	(Finland) Miikka Anttila	Toyota Yaris WRC	RC1	WRC manufacturer	M
8	(Japan) Toyota Gazoo Racing WRT	(Estonia) Ott Tänak	(Estonia) Martin Järveoja	Toyota Yaris WRC	RC1	WRC manufacturer	M
9	(Japan) Toyota Gazoo Racing WRT	(Finland) Esapekka Lappi	(Finland) Janne Ferm	Toyota Yaris WRC	RC1	WRC manufacturer	M
10	(France) Citroën Total Abu Dhabi WRT	(Norway) Mads Østberg	(Norway) Torstein Eriksen	Citroën C3 WRC	RC1	WRC manufacturer	M
11	(France) Citroën Total Abu Dhabi WRT	(Republic of Ireland) Craig Breen	(United Kingdom) Scott Martin	Citroën C3 WRC	RC1	WRC manufacturer	M
31	(Czech Republic) Škoda Motorsport II	(Sweden) Pontus Tidemand	(Sweden) Jonas Andersson	Škoda Fabia R5	RC2	WRC-2	M
32	(United Kingdom) Gus Greensmith	(United Kingdom) Gus Greensmith	(United States) Alessandro Gelsomino	Ford Fiesta R5	RC2	WRC-2	M
33	(Finland) Printsport	(Poland) Łukasz Pieniążek	(Poland) Przemysław Mazur	Škoda Fabia R5	RC2	WRC-2	M
34	(Italy) ACI Team Italia WRC	(Italy) Fabio Andolfi	(Italy) Simone Scattolin	Škoda Fabia R5	RC2	WRC-2	P
35	(France) PH Sport	(Norway) Ole Christian Veiby	(Norway) Stig Rune Skjærmoen	Citroën C3 R5	RC2	WRC-2	M
36	(Czech Republic) Škoda Motorsport II	(Finland) Kalle Rovanperä	(Finland) Jonne Halttunen	Škoda Fabia R5	RC2	WRC-2	M
37	(South Korea) Hyundai Motorsport	(Finland) Jari Huttunen	(Finland) Antti Linnaketo	Hyundai i20 R5	RC2	WRC-2	M
38	(Italy) BRC Racing Team	(France) Pierre-Louis Loubet	(France) Vincent Landais	Hyundai i20 R5	RC2	WRC-2	M
39	(Spain) Nil Solans	(Spain) Nil Solans	(Spain) Marc Martí	Ford Fiesta R5	RC2	WRC-2	P
40	(France) Citroën Total Rallye Team	(France) Stéphane Lefebvre	(France) Gabin Moreau	Citroën C3 R5	RC2	WRC-2	M
41	(Bolivia) Marco Bulacia Wilkinson	(Bolivia) Marco Bulacia Wilkinson	(Argentina) Fernando Mussano	Ford Fiesta R5	RC2	WRC-2	M
42	(Romania) Simone Tempestini	(Romania) Simone Tempestini	(Romania) Sergio Itu	Citroën C3 R5	RC2	WRC-2	M
43	(United Kingdom) M-Sport Ford WRT	(France) Eric Camilli	(France) Benjamin Veillas	Ford Fiesta R5	RC2	WRC-2	P
44	(Turkey) Toksport WRT	(United Kingdom) Chris Ingram	(United Kingdom) Ross Whittock	Škoda Fabia R5	RC2	WRC-2	P
61	(Finland) Taisko Lario	(Finland) Taisko Lario	(Finland) Tatu Hämäläinen	Peugeot 208 R2	RC4	WRC-3	M
62	(Italy) Enrico Brazzoli	(Italy) Enrico Brazzoli	(Italy) Luca Beltrame	Peugeot 208 R2	RC4	WRC-3	P
63	(United Kingdom) Louise Cook	(United Kingdom) Louise Cook	(United Kingdom) Stefan Davis	Ford Fiesta R2	RC4	WRC-3	M
64	(United Kingdom) Tom Williams	(United Kingdom) Tom Williams	(United Kingdom) Phil Hall	Ford Fiesta R2	RC4	WRC-3	P
81	(United Kingdom) M-Sport Ford WRT	(United Kingdom) Matt Edwards	(United Kingdom) Darren Garrod	Ford Fiesta R5	RC2	National	P
82	(United Kingdom) David Bogie	(United Kingdom) David Bogie	(Republic of Ireland) John Rowan	Škoda Fabia R5	RC2	National	D
83	(United Kingdom) Rhys Yates	(United Kingdom) Rhys Yates	(United Kingdom) Elliott Edmondson	Škoda Fabia R5	RC2	National	M
84	(United Kingdom) Tom Cave	(United Kingdom) Tom Cave	(United Kingdom) James Morgan	Hyundai i20 R5	RC2	—N/a	D
85	(India) Team MRF Tyres	(India) Gaurav Gill	(Australia) Glenn MacNeall	Ford Fiesta R5	RC2	—N/a	M
86	(United Kingdom) M-Sport Ford WRT	(United Kingdom) Alex Laffey	(United Kingdom) Patrick Walsh	Ford Fiesta R5	RC2	—N/a	P
87	(Republic of Ireland) Eamonn Boland	(Republic of Ireland) Eamonn Boland	(Republic of Ireland) Michael Joseph Morrissey	Ford Fiesta R5	RC2	—N/a	M
88	(United Kingdom) James Aldridge	(United Kingdom) Sacha Kakad	(United Kingdom) James Aldridge	Ford Fiesta R5	NAT2	National	P
89	(Brazil) Palmeirinha Rally	(Brazil) Paulo Nobre	(Brazil) Gabriel Morales	Ford Fiesta R5	RC2	—N/a	P
90	(United Kingdom) Lawrence Whyte	(United Kingdom) Lawrence Whyte	(United Kingdom) Paul Beaton	Ford Fiesta R5	RC2	—N/a	P
91	Équipe de France FFSA Rally	(France) Jean-Baptiste Franceschi	(France) Romain Courbon	Ford Fiesta R2T	RC4	—N/a	P
92	(Norway) Steve Rokland	(Norway) Steve Rokland	(United Kingdom) Dai Roberts	Peugeot 208 R2	RC4	National	M
93	(United Kingdom) Tom Woodburn	(United Kingdom) James Williams	(United Kingdom) Tom Woodburn	Vauxhall Adam R2	RC4	National	P
94	(United Kingdom) William Creighton	(United Kingdom) William Creighton	(Republic of Ireland) Liam Regan	Peugeot 208 R2	RC4	National	M
95	(United Kingdom) Tony Jardine	(United Kingdom) Tony Jardine	(United Kingdom) Tom Cary	Mitsubishi Lancer Evolution IX	NAT4	—N/a	K
96	(Republic of Ireland) Kevin Horgan	(Republic of Ireland) Kevin Horgan	(United Kingdom) Liam Fouhy	Škoda Fabia R2	RC4	National	K
97	(United Kingdom) John Morrison	(United Kingdom) John Morrison	(United Kingdom) Peter Carstairs	Mitsubishi Lancer Evolution IX	NAT4	National	K
98	(United Kingdom) Paul Walker	(United Kingdom) Paul Walker	(United Kingdom) Geraint Thomas	Subaru Impreza	NAT4	—N/a	Y
99	(United Kingdom) Scott Partridge	(United Kingdom) Scott Partridge	(United Kingdom) Fiona Scarret	Subaru Impreza	NAT4	—N/a	Y
100	(United Kingdom) Peredur Davies	(United Kingdom) Jordan Reynolds	(United Kingdom) Peredur Davies	Ford Fiesta R2	NAT2	National	P
101	(United Kingdom) Finlay Retson	(United Kingdom) Finlay Retson	(United Kingdom) Tom Hynd	Ford Fiesta R2	NAT2	National	P
102	(United Kingdom) Spencer Wilkinson	(United Kingdom) Spencer Wilkinson	(United Kingdom) Glyn Thomas	Subaru Impreza WRX STi	RC2	National	P
103	(United Kingdom) James McDiarmid	(United Kingdom) James McDiarmid	(United Kingdom) Gareth Clarke	Ford Fiesta R2T	RC4	National	P
104	(United Kingdom) Alex Waterman	(United Kingdom) Alex Waterman	(United Kingdom) Harry Thomas	Ford Fiesta R2T	RC4	National	P
105	(United Kingdom) Bart Lang	(United Kingdom) Bart Lang	(United Kingdom) Sinclair Young	Ford Fiesta R2	NAT2	National	P
106	(United Kingdom) Saleh Hijazi	(United Kingdom) Saleh Hijazi	(United Kingdom) Stephen Landen	MG ZR	NAT3	—N/a	P
107	(United Kingdom) Nabila Tejpar	(United Kingdom) Nabila Tejpar	(United Kingdom) Richard Bliss	Peugeot 208 R2	RC4	National	P
108	(United Kingdom) Jonathan Mulholland	(United Kingdom) Jonathan Mulholland	(Republic of Ireland) Jeff Case	Ford Fiesta R2	NAT2	National	P
109	(United Kingdom) Stephen Southall	(United Kingdom) Stephen Southall	(United Kingdom) Richard Bestwick	Ford Escort MK2	NAT4	—N/a	P
110	(United Kingdom) Iwan Evans	(United Kingdom) Iwan Evans	(United Kingdom) Sion Williams	Subaru Impreza	NAT4	—N/a	K
111	(United Kingdom) Neil Andrew	(United Kingdom) Neil Andrew	(United Kingdom) Dominic Adams	Subaru Impreza	NAT4	—N/a	K

=== Calendar changes ===
The event swapped places on the calendar with the Rally Catalunya de España. Where the 2017 rally was run as the penultimate round of the championship, the 2018 event was brought forward from the last week of October to the first week in the expectation of better weather conditions for the event. Toyota driver Jari-Matti Latvala anticipated that the change would see the rally run with stable, more-predictable temperatures than in previous years, making it easier to set the car up for the prevailing conditions. Further changes to the calendar saw the revival of Rally Turkey as a replacement for Rally Poland. The Turkish event was named as the tenth round of the championship and in light of the distance crews needed to travel from Turkey to Wales, the Fédération Internationale de l'Automobile (FIA)—the governing body of international motorsport—gave entrants an additional week to prepare for Rally GB compared to previous years.

=== Route ===
The 2018 event featured a heavily revised route from the 2017 rally. The route for the 2018 event was designed to be more challenging than the routes used in previous years. The changes were introduced in response to criticism from crews and teams over the lengthy transport route, or the route taken on public roads to travel between special stages. The final route featured an additional 14.98 km (9.31 miles) in competitive kilometres compared to the 2017 route and the transport distance was shortened. The changes to the route allowed the crews to return to the service park in Deeside at the end of the first day of competition as the omission of the return to the service park had been one of the teams' criticisms of the 2017 event.

==== Details ====
The rally was made up of gravel roads through forests and moors. Many of these roads received little commercial traffic through the year aside from forestry maintenance and logging projects. Unlike events such as Rally Italia Sardegna and Rally Australia where loose gravel on the road surface creates dust, the road surface in Wales is made up of heavier gravel on a hard-packed road base. This creates more grip for crews in the dry, but the roads can become muddy and rutted in wet weather, particularly when a stage is used multiple times.

The event featured two days in northern Wales and one day in the middle of the country. The first leg was 111.20 km (69.10 miles) long and started with a spectator stage at Tir Prince Raceway on the evening of 4 October. It then moved into the forests of Conwy and Gwynedd on 5 October and was made up of two passes over Clocaenog Forest, Penmachno Forest and a new stage formed by merging the Brenig reservoir stage—which was run as the Power Stage between 2014 and 2017—with the Alwen stage using parts of the B4501 to connect them. Now known as Brenig, it was the longest stage of the rally at 29.19 km (18.14 miles). Penmachno Forest was run in its full length by using public roads. The Cholmondeley Castle spectator stage in England was removed and replaced by a new spectator stage called Slate Mountain. The rally moved to Powys and Ceredigion on 6 October for the longest day of the rally, totalling 146.45 km (91.00 miles) competitive kilometres. It consisted of two passes over the Myherin, Hafren, Dyfi and Gartheiniog stages and a single running of Dyfnant. The Hafren stage was extended to include the Sweet Lamb spectator arena. The 2018 event marked the first time since 1997 that these five stages were run on the same day. The rally returned to northern Wales on 7 October and the forests of Conwy and Snowdonia. The third leg was the shortest of the rally at 60.20 km (37.41 miles) long and featured Elsi, a brand new stage, and two passes of Gwydir. The Gwydir stage was doubled in length from previous years before the rally concludes with two passes over a spectator stage around the Great Orme headland and the streets of Llandudno. A shortened version of the Great Orme stage had previously been used in 2011 when it was run in the opposite direction.

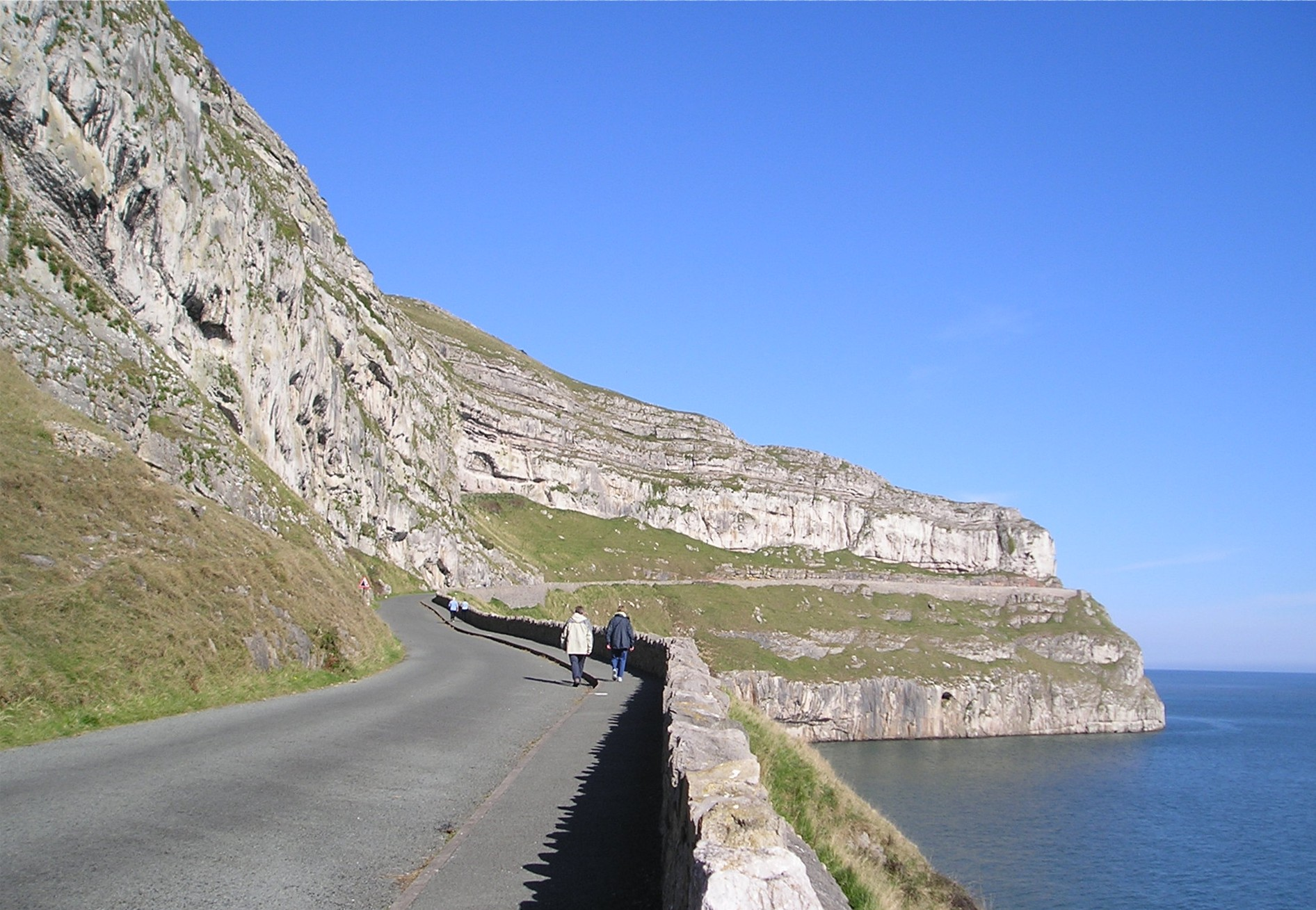

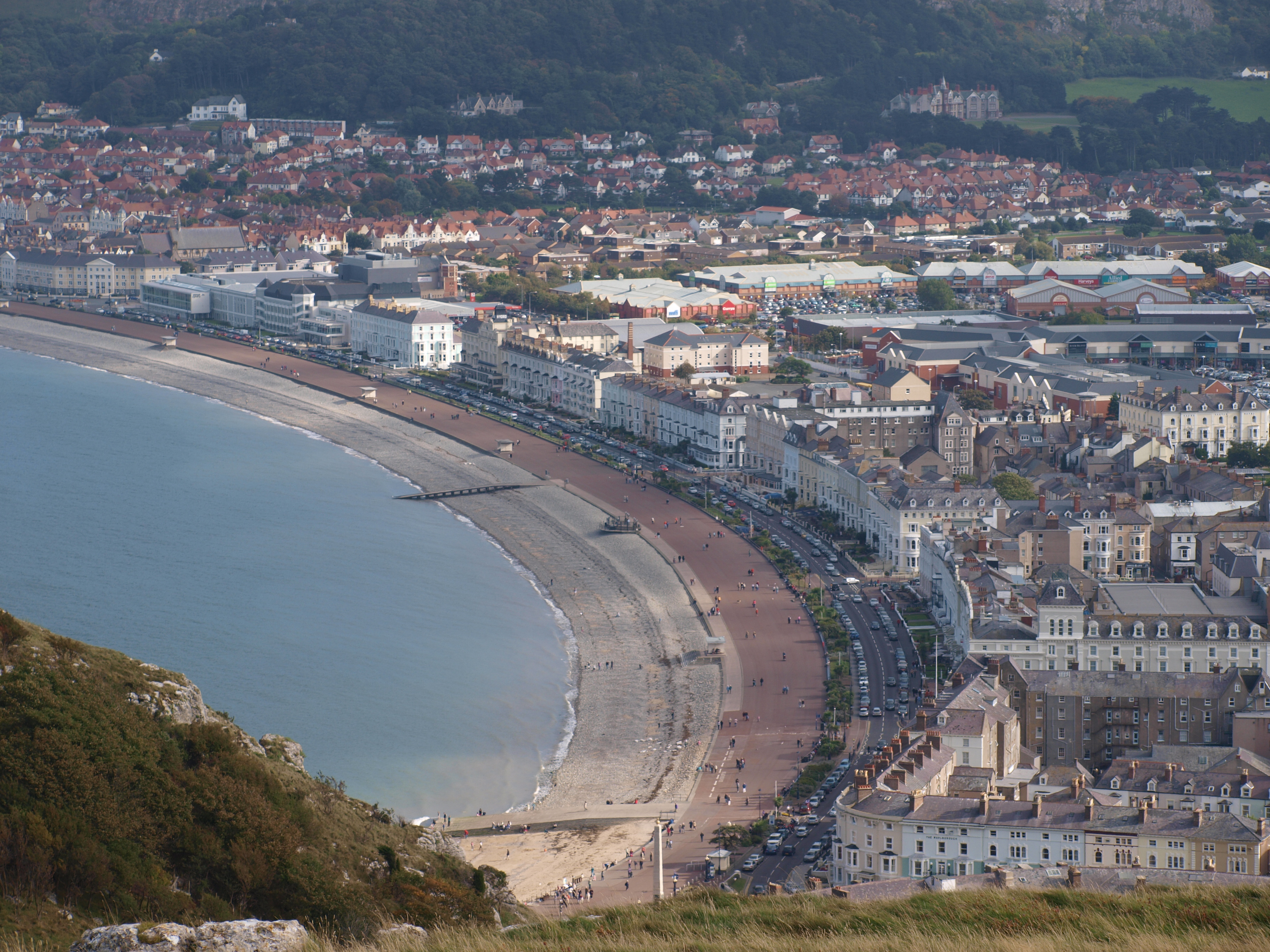
The final stage of the rally circles the Great Orme headland (top) and finishes on the Llandudno Promenade (bottom).

Organisers of the event had a dispute with the Fédération Internationale de l'Automobile (FIA) over the planned route. The original proposal featured the Great Orme stage—which had previously featured in the route of the 2013 event—as the event's Power Stage. However, the FIA rejected the route as the proposed stage was not representative of the rally; the route primarily consisted of gravel stages, but the proposed stage was tarmac. The dispute was resolved when the organisers agreed to run the first pass over Gwydir as the Power Stage, allowing the event to finish in Llandudno as originally planned.

The inclusion of public roads in the route was made possible with the passage of the Deregulation Act 2015 by the British government, which amended parts of the Road Traffic Act 1988 to make it possible for events to close public roads to be used for motor racing events in the United Kingdom. In February 2018, the National Assembly for Wales passed the Road Traffic Act 1988 (Motor Racing) (Wales) Regulations 2018, a piece of secondary legislation that enabled motor racing events to take place on public roads in Wales.

==== Itinerary ====
Date	No.	Stage name	Distance	Location
4 Oct.		Service park – Deeside Rally Village	—	Deeside, Flintshire
4 Oct.	—	Clocaenog [Shakedown]	3.37 km	Clocaenog Forest, Conwy
4 Oct.		Service park – Deeside Rally Village	—	Deeside, Flintshire
4 Oct.	—	Ceremonial start – Tir Prince Raceway	—	Towyn, Conwy
4 Oct.	Leg 1 — North Wales — 112.46 km			
4 Oct.	SS1	Tir Prince	1.70 km	Towyn, Conwy
5 Oct.		Service park – Deeside Rally Village	—	Deeside, Flintshire
5 Oct.	SS2	Clocaenog 1	7.67 km	Clocaenog Forest, Conwy
5 Oct.	SS3	Brenig 1	29.13 km	Llyn Brenig, Conwy
5 Oct.	SS4	Penmachno 1	16.95 km	Penmachno, Conwy
5 Oct.	SS5	Slate Mountain 1	1.63 km	Blaenau Ffestiniog, Gwynedd
5 Oct.	SS6	Slate Mountain 2	1.63 km	Blaenau Ffestiniog, Gwynedd
5 Oct.		Regroup	—	
5 Oct.		Service park – Deeside Rally Village	—	Deeside, Flintshire
5 Oct.	SS7	Clocaenog 2	7.67 km	Clocaenog Forest, Conwy
5 Oct.	SS8	Brenig 2	29.13 km	Llyn Brenig, Conwy
5 Oct.	SS9	Penmachno 2	16.95 km	Penmachno, Conwy
5 Oct.		Service park – Deeside Rally Village	—	Deeside, Flintshire
Leg 2 — Mid-Wales — 150.24 km
6 Oct.		Service park – Deeside Rally Village	—	Deeside, Flintshire
6 Oct.	SS10	Myherin 1	20.28 km	River Wye, Powys
6 Oct.	SS11	Sweet Lamb Hafren 1	19.95 km	Hafren Forest, Powys
6 Oct.	SS12	Dyfi 1	19.48 km	River Dovey, Ceredigion
6 Oct.	SS13	Gartheiniog 1	11.26 km	Afon Dulas, Ceredigion
6 Oct.	SS14	Dyfnant	8.30 km	Dyfnant Forest, Powys
6 Oct.		Regroup – Newtown	—	Newtown, Powys
6 Oct.		Tyre and Light Fitting Zone – Newtown	—	Newtown, Powys
6 Oct.	SS15	Myherin 2	20.28 km	River Wye, Powys
6 Oct.	SS16	Sweet Lamb Hafren 2	19.95 km	Hafren Forest, Powys
6 Oct.	SS17	Dyfi 2	19.48 km	River Dovey, Ceredigion
6 Oct.	SS18	Gartheiniog 2	11.26 km	Afon Dulas, Ceredigion
6 Oct.		Service park – Deeside Rally Village	—	Deeside, Flintshire
Leg 3 — North Wales — 55.64 km
7 Oct.		Service park – Deeside Rally Village	—	Deeside, Flintshire
7 Oct.	SS19	Elsi	10.06 km	Llyn Elsi, Snowdonia
7 Oct.	SS20	Gwydir 1 [Power Stage]	14.76 km	Gwydir Forest, Snowdonia
7 Oct.	SS21	Great Orme Llandudno 1	8.03 km	Llandudno, Conwy
7 Oct.		Tyre Fitting Zone – Dolgarrog	—	Dolgarrog, Conwy
7 Oct.	SS22	Gwydir 2	14.76 km	Gwydir Forest, Snowdonia
7 Oct.		Regroup – Llandudno	—	Llandudno, Conwy
7 Oct.	SS23	Great Orme Llandudno 2	8.03 km	Llandudno, Conwy
7 Oct.		Ceremonial finish – Llandudno Promenade	—	Llandudno, Conwy

==== Reception ====
The new route was received positively by drivers—particularly former Citroën driver Kris Meeke—who appreciated the inclusion of challenging stages. (Note: Kris Meeke had been scheduled to contest the rally with Citroën Total Abu Dhabi WRT when the route was published, but was fired by the team before the rally.) Thierry Neuville and Craig Breen also applauded the route as the best route used by the rally since it moved from Cardiff to Deeside. Defending rally winner Elfyn Evans had a more muted response, expressing disappointment that organisers had not taken full advantage of road closures to create a more demanding route, such as merging the Dyfi and Gartheiniog stages. Rally organisers revealed that they had considered many of the suggestions Evans had raised, but chose a more conservative approach to road closures as the legislation that allowed them to close roads had only been passed in February 2018 and they wanted to ensure that the protocol had been followed properly.

== Report ==
=== Leg 1 ===
Esapekka Lappi and Janne Ferm completed the opening super special stage three tenths of a second ahead of fellow Toyota crew Jari-Matti Latvala and Miikka Anttila and championship leaders Thierry Neuville and Nicolas Gilsoul, who tied for second. As the event moved into the forest stages, Ott Tänak and Martin Järveoja—who entered the rally having taken three consecutive victories—dominated the early running. He won five of the eight stages and established a comfortable lead to end the day twenty-eight seconds ahead of Neuville and Gilsoul. Tänak had been closely matched by defending rally winners Elfyn Evans and Daniel Barritt until their Fiesta WRC developed a misfire and was forced to retire from the leg. Latvala and Anttila dropped down to third overall after losing their rhythm in the afternoon loop. Lappi and Ferm recovered from an early spin to finish fourth, while Sébastien Ogier and Julien Ingrassia completed the leg in fifth. Ogier and Ingrassia had fallen to eighth during the first pass over the stages when they suffered a series of spins and the loss of first and second gear. Their M-Sport Ford teammates Teemu Suninen and Mikko Markkula completed the team's woes when they slid off the road and into a ditch; Suninen and Markkula were unable to re-enter the rally. Craig Breen and Scott Martin were the lead Citroën crew in sixth after enjoying a trouble-free day, ahead of Hyundai crews led Hayden Paddon and Sebastian Marshall in seventh and Andreas Mikkelsen and Anders Jæger-Synnevaag in eighth. Both Paddon and Mikkelsen complained of unpredictable handling in their cars, particularly during the afternoon loop of stages when rain affected the profile of the roads. Neuville, by comparison, reported that his car's handling improved in the afternoon, benefiting from a new specification of tyre provided by Michelin that offered improved grip whilst being more durable than previous tyres. Citroën's Mads Østberg and Torstein Eriksen were the last of the drivers in a World Rally Car-specification entry, finishing the leg in ninth place.

=== Leg 2 ===
Ott Tänak and Martin Järveoja continued their form through the opening stages of the second leg until they were forced to retire. Tänak damaged his radiator after a heavy landing off a jump during the second pass through Sweet Lamb Hafren. Tänak and Järveoja had experienced similar retirements in the Rallies of Portugal and Sardinia. Ogier and Ingrassia experienced a resurgence, climbing from fifth place to take the lead; however, Ogier chose the more-durable medium compound tyres as the dry gravel would damage the faster soft compound, and was unable to build a lead of his own. He finished the leg with a slender four-second advantage over the surviving Toyotas of Jari-Matti Latvala and Miikka Anttila in second place and Esapekka Lappi and Janne Ferm in third. Craig Breen and Scott Martin ended the leg in fourth, some fifteen seconds off the lead. The reversal of the running order for the second leg meant that Mads Østberg and Torstein Eriksen ran with favourable road conditions, which allowed them to find some pace in the morning loop and climb the leaderboard. Andreas Mikkelsen and Anders Jæger-Synnevaag similarly benefited from their road position, winning three of the day's stages and finishing the leg two and a half seconds behind Østberg and Eriksen. Hayden Paddon and Sebastian Marshall completed the day in seventh overall ahead of Thierry Neuville and Nicolas Gilsoul; Neuville and Gilsoul had been running second at the time, but lost fifty-one seconds when they ran off the road in the early morning stages and he conceded a further fifteen seconds to Ogier and Ingrassia when they was unable to match the leaders' pace.

=== Leg 3 ===
The final leg of the rally saw Ogier and Ingrassia trade places with Latvala and Anttila several times. Ogier and Ingrassia initially held the advantage, but a fast time by Latvala and Anttila through the Gwydir Power Stage—that saw them take the five bonus points—was enough to seize the lead. Latvala and Anttila held the lead through the first pass over Great Orme Llandudno, only for Ogier and Ingrassia to reclaim it on the return to Gwydir. The final stage was delayed following an incident that required the attention of emergency services and not all of the competitors were able to start the stage. Latvala and Anttila was unable to set a competitive time, meaning Ogier and Ingrassia only needed to finish to claim victory. They ultimately set a time fast enough to win the stage and the rally, taking twenty-five World Championship points for the win and an additional three points for third place on the Power Stage. Esapekka Lappi and Janne Ferm completed the podium and scored an extra Power Stage point. Craig Breen and Scott Martin were fourth, ahead of Neuville and Gilsoul. Neuville and Gilsoul led the three Hyundais, with Mikkelsen and Jæger-Synnevaag in sixth and Paddon and Marshall seventh. Mads Østberg and Torstein Eriksen were eighth, with the final points-scoring places going to World Rally Championship-2 entrants Kalle Rovanperä and Jonne Halttunen and their Škoda Motorsport teammates Pontus Tidemand and Jonas Andersson. Ott Tänak and Martin Järveoja re-entered under Rally2 regulations and finished nineteenth overall, scoring four points on the Power Stage in the process. Elfyn Evans and Daniel Barritt also re-entered and finished twentieth in the final classification.

=== Support categories ===
In the World Rally Championship-2 standings, eighteen year-old Kalle Rovanperä and co-driver Jonne Halttunen finished the first leg as the category leader and tenth in the overall standings. Rovanperä and Halttunen won every stage but one to establish a lead of fifty-five seconds over teammates Pontus Tidemand and Jonas Andersson, while British privateers Gus Greensmith and Alessandro Gelsomino finished the leg in third. Rovanperä and Halttunen maintained their lead over Tidemand and Andersson throughout the second leg and the two crews climbed to ninth and tenth in the overall classification following the retirement of Tänak and Järveoja. Rovanperä and Halttunen went on to win the category by ninety-four seconds, aided by an off-road excursion by Tidemand and Andersson in the Power Stage. Tidemand and Andersson damaged their rear suspension, but were able to continue after repairing the damage during a transport stage. The result was Rovanperä and Haltunnen's second win in the category. Tidemand and Andersson recovered to finish second, with Greensmith and Gelsomino finishing third.

Tom Williams and Phil Hall led the first leg in the World Rally Championship-3 category after trading stage wins with Taisko Lario and Tatu Hämäläinen throughout the day. Williams and Hall's lead was consolidated during the second leg when Lario and Hämäläinen were late checking into a stage and had thirty seconds added to his time as a penalty. Williams and Hall went on to win the event, marking their first victory in the category. Italian privateers Enrico Brazzoli and Luca Beltrame caught and passed Lario and Hämäläinen during the second leg and held the position until the end of the rally. Lario and Hämäläinen ultimately finished third overall.

The first two legs of the rally also served as the final two rounds of the MSA British Rally Championship. M-Sport driver Matt Edwards and co-driver Darren Garrod secured the 2018 championship title with fourth place on the first leg of the rally. Edwards and Garrod won the second leg and were the highest-place national entrant at the end of the rally.

== Classification ==
=== Final results ===
Pos.	No.	Driver	Co-driver	Entrant	Car	Class	Time	Difference	
Pos.	No.	Driver	Co-driver	Entrant	Car	Class	Time	to 1st	to prev.
1	1	(France) Sébastien Ogier	(France) Julien Ingrassia	(United Kingdom) M-Sport Ford WRT	Ford Fiesta WRC	WRC	3:06:12.5	0.0	0.0
2	7	(Finland) Jari-Matti Latvala	(Finland) Miikka Anttila	(Japan) Toyota Gazoo Racing WRT	Toyota Yaris WRC	WRC	3:06:23.1	+10.6	+10.6
3	9	(Finland) Esapekka Lappi	(Finland) Janne Ferm	(Japan) Toyota Gazoo Racing WRT	Toyota Yaris WRC	WRC	3:06:47.6	+35.1	+24.5
4	11	(Republic of Ireland) Craig Breen	(United Kingdom) Scott Martin	(France) Citroën Total Abu Dhabi WRT	Citroën C3 WRC	WRC	3:07:22.9	+1:10.4	+35.3
5	5	(Belgium) Thierry Neuville	(Belgium) Nicolas Gilsoul	(South Korea) Hyundai Shell Mobis WRT	Hyundai i20 Coupe WRC	WRC	3:07:26.9	+1:14.4	+4.0
6	4	(Norway) Andreas Mikkelsen	(Norway) Anders Jæger-Synnevaag	(South Korea) Hyundai Shell Mobis WRT	Hyundai i20 Coupe WRC	WRC	3:07:28.4	+1:15.9	+1.5
7	6	(New Zealand) Hayden Paddon	(United Kingdom) Sebastian Marshall	(South Korea) Hyundai Shell Mobis WRT	Hyundai i20 Coupe WRC	WRC	3:07:30.9	+1:18.4	+2.5
8	10	(Norway) Mads Østberg	(Norway) Torstein Eriksen	(France) Citroën Total Abu Dhabi WRT	Citroën C3 WRC	WRC	3:07:34.1	+1:21.6	+3.2
9	36	(Finland) Kalle Rovanperä	(Finland) Jonne Halttunen	(Czech Republic) Škoda Motorsport II	Škoda Fabia R5	WRC-2	3:15:27.2	+9:14.7	+7:53.1
10	31	(Sweden) Pontus Tidemand	(Sweden) Jonas Andersson	(Czech Republic) Škoda Motorsport II	Škoda Fabia R5	WRC-2	3:17:01.4	+10:48.9	+1:34.2
11	32	(United Kingdom) Gus Greensmith	(United States) Alessandro Gelsomino	(United Kingdom) Gus Greensmith	Ford Fiesta R5	WRC-2	3:17:40.8	+11:28.3	+39.4
12	37	(Finland) Jari Huttunen	(Finland) Antti Linnaketo	(South Korea) Hyundai Motorsport	Hyundai i20 R5	WRC-2	3:18:24.0	+12:11.5	+43.2
13	40	(France) Stéphane Lefebvre	(France) Gabin Moreau	(France) Citroën Total Rallye Team	Citroën C3 R5	WRC-2	3:20:02.6	+13:50.1	+1:38.6
14	33	(Poland) Łukasz Pieniążek	(Poland) Przemysław Mazur	(Finland) Printsport	Škoda Fabia R5	WRC-2	3:21:47.3	+15:34.8	+1:44.7
15	42	(Romania) Simone Tempestini	(Romania) Sergio Itu	(Romania) Simone Tempestini	Citroën C3 R5	WRC-2	3:24:16.9	+18:04.4	+2:29.6
16	34	(Italy) Fabio Andolfi	(Italy) Simone Scattolin	(Italy) ACI Team Italia WRC	Škoda Fabia R5	WRC-2	3:24:34.3	+18:21.8	+17.4
17	81	(United Kingdom) Matt Edwards	(United Kingdom) Darren Garrod	(United Kingdom) M-Sport Ford WRT	Ford Fiesta R5	National	3:25:42.0	+19:29.5	+1:07.7
18	41	(Bolivia) Marco Bulacia Wilkinson	(Argentina) Fernando Mussano	(Bolivia) Marco Bulacia Wilkinson	Ford Fiesta R5	WRC-2	3:26:12.2	+19:59.7	+30.2
19	8	(Estonia) Ott Tänak	(Estonia) Martin Järveoja	(Japan) Toyota Gazoo Racing WRT	Toyota Yaris WRC	WRC	3:26:51.4	+20:38.9	+39.2
20	2	(United Kingdom) Elfyn Evans	(United Kingdom) Daniel Barritt	(United Kingdom) M-Sport Ford WRT	Ford Fiesta WRC	WRC	3:27:40.5	+21:28.0	+49.1
21	86	(United Kingdom) Alex Laffey	(United Kingdom) Patrick Walsh	(United Kingdom) M-Sport Ford WRT	Ford Fiesta R5	National	3:31:44.7	+25:32.2	+4:04.2
22	85	(India) Gaurav Gill	(Australia) Glenn MacNeall	(India) Team MRF Tyres	Ford Fiesta R5	—N/a	3:33:27.4	+27:14.9	+1:42.7
23	89	(Brazil) Paulo Nobre	(Brazil) Gabriel Morales	(Brazil) Palmeirinha Rally	Ford Fiesta R5	—N/a	3:34:39.2	+28:26.7	+1:11.8
24	43	(France) Eric Camilli	(France) Benjamin Veillas	(United Kingdom) M-Sport Ford WRT	Ford Fiesta R5	WRC-2	3:42:48.7	+27:21.5	+8:09.5
25	87	(Republic of Ireland) Eamonn Boland	(Republic of Ireland) Michael Joseph Morrissey	(Republic of Ireland) Eamonn Boland	Ford Fiesta R5	—N/a	3:43:02.4	+36:49.9	+13.7
26	35	(Norway) Ole Christian Veiby	(Norway) Stig Rune Skjærmoen	(France) PH Sport	Citroën C3 R5	WRC-2	3:48:28.3	+42:15.8	+5:25.9
27	87	(Norway) Steve Rokland	(United Kingdom) Dai Roberts	(Norway) Steve Rokland	Peugeot 208 R2	National	3:48:51.2	+42:38.7	+22.9
28	64	(United Kingdom) Tom Williams	(United Kingdom) Phil Hall	(United Kingdom) Tom Williams	Ford Fiesta R2	WRC-3	3:49:44.9	+43:32.4	+53.7
29	91	(France) Jean-Baptiste Franceschi	(France) Romain Courbon	Équipe de France FFSA Rally	Ford Fiesta R2T	—N/a	3:50:27.8	+44:15.3	+42.9
30	93	(United Kingdom) Tom Woodburn	(United Kingdom) James Williams	(United Kingdom) Tom Woodburn	Vauxhall Adam R2	National	3:53:52.9	+47:40.4	+3:25.1
31	62	(Italy) Enrico Brazzoli	(Italy) Luca Beltrame	(Italy) Enrico Brazzoli	Peugeot 208 R2	WRC-3	3:54:23.4	+48:10.9	+30.5
32	61	(Finland) Taisko Lario	(Finland) Tatu Hämäläinen	(Finland) Taisko Lario	Peugeot 208 R2	WRC-3	3:56:40.0	+50:27.5	+2:16.6
33	95	(United Kingdom) Tony Jardine	(United Kingdom) Tom Cary	(United Kingdom) Tony Jardine	Mitsubishi Lancer Evolution IX	—N/a	3:57:42.5	+51:30.0	+1:02.5
34	44	(United Kingdom) Chris Ingram	(United Kingdom) Ross Whittock	(Turkey) Toksport WRT	Škoda Fabia R5	WRC-2	4:00:45.9	+54:33.4	+3:03.4
35	97	(United Kingdom) John Morrison	(United Kingdom) Peter Carstairs	(United Kingdom) John Morrison	Mitsubishi Lancer Evolution IX	National	4:01:44.3	+55:31.8	+58.4
36	104	(United Kingdom) Alex Waterman	(United Kingdom) Harry Thomas	(United Kingdom) Alex Waterman	Ford Fiesta R2T	National	4:06:34.8	+1:00:22.3	+4:50.5
37	102	(United Kingdom) Spencer Wilkinson	(United Kingdom) Glyn Thomas	(United Kingdom) Spencer Wilkinson	Subaru Impreza WRX STi	—N/a	4:07:23.9	+1:01:11.4	+49.1
38	63	(United Kingdom) Louise Cook	(United Kingdom) Stefan Davis	(United Kingdom) Louise Cook	Ford Fiesta R2	WRC-3	4:09:08.7	+1:02:56.2	+1:44.8
39	108	(United Kingdom) Jonathan Mulholland	(Republic of Ireland) Jeff Case	(United Kingdom) Jonathan Mulholland	Ford Fiesta R2	National	4:12:23.3	+1:06:10.8	+3:14.6
40	100	(United Kingdom) Peredur Davies	(United Kingdom) Jordan Reynolds	(United Kingdom) Peredur Davies	Ford Fiesta R2	National	4:19:54.9	+1:13:42.4	+7:31.6
41	101	(United Kingdom) Finlay Retson	(United Kingdom) Tom Hynd	(United Kingdom) Finlay Retson	Ford Fiesta R2	National	4:27:21.8	+1:21:09.3	+7:26.9
42	39	(Spain) Nil Solans	(Spain) Marc Martí	(Spain) Nil Solans	Ford Fiesta R5	WRC-2	4:28:14.1	+1:22:01.6	+52.3
43	107	(United Kingdom) Nabila Tejpar	(United Kingdom) Richard Bliss	(United Kingdom) Nabila Tejpar	Peugeot 208 R2	National	4:32:25.2	+1:26:12.7	+4:11.1
44	106	(United Kingdom) Saleh Hijazi	(United Kingdom) Stephen Landen	(United Kingdom) Saleh Hijazi	MG ZR	—N/a	4:33:21.0	+1:27:08.5	+55.8
45	111	(United Kingdom) Neil Andrew	(United Kingdom) Dominic Adams	(United Kingdom) Neil Andrew	Subaru Impreza	—N/a	4:42:26.1	+1:36:13.6	+9:05.1
46	109	(United Kingdom) Stephen Southall	(United Kingdom) Richard Bestwick	(United Kingdom) Stephen Southall	Ford Escort MK2	—N/a	4:43:24.5	+1:37:12.0	+58.4
47	96	(Republic of Ireland) Kevin Horgan	(United Kingdom) Liam Fouhy	(Republic of Ireland) Kevin Horgan	Škoda Fabia R2	National	4:43:53.4	+1:37:40.9	+28.9
48	105	(United Kingdom) Bart Lang	(United Kingdom) Sinclair Young	(United Kingdom) Bart Lang	Ford Fiesta R2	National	4:48:35.6	+1:42:23.1	+4:42.2
Ret	84	(United Kingdom) Tom Cave	(United Kingdom) James Morgan	(United Kingdom) Tom Cave	Hyundai i20 R5	—N/a	Retired SS21		
Ret	38	(France) Pierre-Louis Loubet	(France) Vincent Landais	(Italy) BRC Racing Team	Hyundai i20 R5	WRC-2	Retired SS21		
Ret	82	(United Kingdom) David Bogie	(Republic of Ireland) John Rowan	(United Kingdom) David Bogie	Škoda Fabia R5	National	Retired SS20		
Ret	83	(United Kingdom) Rhys Yates	(United Kingdom) Elliott Edmondson	(United Kingdom) Rhys Yates	Škoda Fabia R5	National	Retired SS15		
Ret	99	(United Kingdom) Scott Partridge	(United Kingdom) Fiona Scarret	(United Kingdom) Scott Partridge	Subaru Impreza	—N/a	Retired SS11		
Ret	88	(United Kingdom) James Aldridge	(United Kingdom) Sacha Kakad	(United Kingdom) James Aldridge	Ford Fiesta R5	—N/a	Retired SS11		
Ret	3	(Finland) Teemu Suninen	(Finland) Mikko Markkula	(United Kingdom) M-Sport Ford WRT	Ford Fiesta WRC	WRC	Retired SS9		
Ret	110	(United Kingdom) Iwan Evans	(United Kingdom) Sion Williams	(United Kingdom) Iwan Evans	Subaru Impreza	—N/a	Retired SS8		
Ret	94	(United Kingdom) William Creighton	(Republic of Ireland) Liam Regan	(United Kingdom) William Creighton	Peugeot 208 R2	National	Retired SS3		
DNS	90	(United Kingdom) Lawrence Whyte	(United Kingdom) Paul Beaton	(United Kingdom) Lawrence Whyte	Ford Fiesta R5	—N/a	Did not start		
DNS	98	(United Kingdom) Paul Walker	(United Kingdom) Geraint Thomas	(United Kingdom) Paul Walker	Subaru Impreza	—N/a	Did not start		
DNS	103	(United Kingdom) James McDiarmid	(United Kingdom) Gareth Clarke	(United Kingdom) James McDiarmid	Ford Fiesta R2T	National	Did not start		

=== Special stages ===
Overall classification
Day	Stage	Name	Length	Stage winners	Car	Time	Class leaders
4 October	—	Clocaenog [Shakedown]	3.32 km	(Finland) Teemu Suninen — (Finland) Mikko Markkula	Ford Fiesta WRC	2:01.2	—N/a
4 October	SS1	Tir Prince	1.70 km	(Finland) Esapekka Lappi — (Finland) Janne Ferm	Toyota Yaris WRC	1:21.6	(Finland) Esapekka Lappi — (Finland) Janne Ferm
5 October	SS2	Clocaenog 1	7.67 km	(Estonia) Ott Tänak — (Estonia) Martin Järveoja	Toyota Yaris WRC	4:07.2	(Estonia) Ott Tänak — (Estonia) Martin Järveoja
5 October	SS3	Brenig 1	29.13 km	(Estonia) Ott Tänak — (Estonia) Martin Järveoja	Toyota Yaris WRC	16:52.4	(Estonia) Ott Tänak — (Estonia) Martin Järveoja
5 October	SS4	Penmachno 1	16.95 km	(Estonia) Ott Tänak — (Estonia) Martin Järveoja	Toyota Yaris WRC	10:15.9	(Estonia) Ott Tänak — (Estonia) Martin Järveoja
5 October	SS5	Slate Mountain 1	1.63 km	(Belgium) Thierry Neuville — (Belgium) Nicolas Gilsoul	Hyundai i20 Coupe WRC	1:16.8	(Estonia) Ott Tänak — (Estonia) Martin Järveoja
5 October	SS6	Slate Mountain 2	1.63 km	(Finland) Jari-Matti Latvala — (Finland) Miikka Anttila	Toyota Yaris WRC	1:15.3	(Estonia) Ott Tänak — (Estonia) Martin Järveoja
5 October	SS7	Clocaenog 2	7.67 km	(Estonia) Ott Tänak — (Estonia) Martin Järveoja	Toyota Yaris WRC	4:01.6	(Estonia) Ott Tänak — (Estonia) Martin Järveoja
5 October	SS8	Brenig 2	29.13 km	(Estonia) Ott Tänak — (Estonia) Martin Järveoja	Toyota Yaris WRC	16:30.5	(Estonia) Ott Tänak — (Estonia) Martin Järveoja
5 October	SS9	Penmachno 2	16.95 km	(Belgium) Thierry Neuville — (Belgium) Nicolas Gilsoul	Hyundai i20 Coupe WRC	10:16.4	(Estonia) Ott Tänak — (Estonia) Martin Järveoja
6 October	SS10	Myherin 1	20.28 km	(France) Sébastien Ogier — (France) Julien Ingrassia	Ford Fiesta WRC	10:46.2	(Estonia) Ott Tänak — (Estonia) Martin Järveoja
6 October	SS11	Sweet Lamb Hafren 1	19.95 km	(Norway) Mads Østberg — (Norway) Torstein Eriksen	Citroën C3 WRC	11:39.4	(Estonia) Ott Tänak — (Estonia) Martin Järveoja
6 October	SS12	Dyfi 1	19.48 km	(Estonia) Ott Tänak — (Estonia) Martin Järveoja	Toyota Yaris WRC	10:56.7	(Estonia) Ott Tänak — (Estonia) Martin Järveoja
6 October	SS13	Gartheiniog 1	11.26 km	(Norway) Andreas Mikkelsen — (Norway) Anders Jæger-Synnevaag	Hyundai i20 Coupe WRC	6:51.0	(Estonia) Ott Tänak — (Estonia) Martin Järveoja
6 October	SS14	Dyfnant	8.30 km	(Finland) Jari-Matti Latvala — (Finland) Miikka Anttila	Toyota Yaris WRC	4:28.2	(Estonia) Ott Tänak — (Estonia) Martin Järveoja
6 October	SS15	Myherin 2	20.28 km	(France) Sébastien Ogier — (France) Julien Ingrassia	Ford Fiesta WRC	10:37.9	(Estonia) Ott Tänak — (Estonia) Martin Järveoja
6 October	SS16	Sweet Lamb Hafren 2	19.95 km	(Norway) Andreas Mikkelsen — (Norway) Anders Jæger-Synnevaag	Hyundai i20 Coupe WRC	11:26.6	(France) Sébastien Ogier — (France) Julien Ingrassia
6 October	SS17	Dyfi 2	19.48 km	(Finland) Jari-Matti Latvala — (Finland) Miikka Anttila	Toyota Yaris WRC	10:42.8	(France) Sébastien Ogier — (France) Julien Ingrassia
6 October	SS18	Gartheiniog 2	11.26 km	(Norway) Andreas Mikkelsen — (Norway) Anders Jæger-Synnevaag	Hyundai i20 Coupe WRC	6:43.6	(France) Sébastien Ogier — (France) Julien Ingrassia
7 October	SS19	Elsi	10.06 km	(Finland) Esapekka Lappi — (Finland) Janne Ferm	Toyota Yaris WRC	7:17.1	(France) Sébastien Ogier — (France) Julien Ingrassia
7 October	SS20	Gwydir 1 [Power stage]	14.70 km	(Finland) Jari-Matti Latvala — (Finland) Miikka Anttila	Toyota Yaris WRC	9:31.6	(Finland) Jari-Matti Latvala — (Finland) Miikka Anttila
7 October	SS21	Great Orme Llandudno 1	8.03 km	(France) Sébastien Ogier — (France) Julien Ingrassia	Ford Fiesta WRC	4:22.0	(Finland) Jari-Matti Latvala — (Finland) Miikka Anttila
7 October	SS22	Gwydir 2	14.70 km	(France) Sébastien Ogier — (France) Julien Ingrassia	Ford Fiesta WRC	9:30.4	(France) Sébastien Ogier — (France) Julien Ingrassia
7 October	SS23	Great Orme Llandudno 2	7.43 km (Note: The original length of the stage was 8.03 km, but it was shortened following an emergency incident on the first pass through the stage.)	(France) Sébastien Ogier — (France) Julien Ingrassia	Ford Fiesta WRC	3:59.3	(France) Sébastien Ogier — (France) Julien Ingrassia
World Rally Championship-2
4 October	—	Clocaenog [Shakedown]	3.32 km	(Finland) Kalle Rovanperä — (Finland) Jonne Halttunen	Škoda Fabia R5	2:07.0	—N/a
4 October	SS1	Tir Prince	1.70 km	(Finland) Kalle Rovanperä — (Finland) Jonne Halttunen	Škoda Fabia R5	1:23.8	(Finland) Kalle Rovanperä — (Finland) Jonne Halttunen
5 October	SS2	Clocaenog 1	7.67 km	(Finland) Kalle Rovanperä — (Finland) Jonne Halttunen	Škoda Fabia R5	4:17.6	(Finland) Kalle Rovanperä — (Finland) Jonne Halttunen
5 October	SS3	Brenig 1	29.13 km	(Finland) Kalle Rovanperä — (Finland) Jonne Halttunen	Škoda Fabia R5	17:29.7	(Finland) Kalle Rovanperä — (Finland) Jonne Halttunen
5 October	SS4	Penmachno 1	16.95 km	(Finland) Kalle Rovanperä — (Finland) Jonne Halttunen	Škoda Fabia R5	10:48.8	(Finland) Kalle Rovanperä — (Finland) Jonne Halttunen
5 October	SS5	Slate Mountain 1	1.63 km	(Sweden) Pontus Tidemand — (Sweden) Jonas Andersson	Škoda Fabia R5	1:21.1	(Finland) Kalle Rovanperä — (Finland) Jonne Halttunen
5 October	SS6	Slate Mountain 2	1.63 km	(Finland) Kalle Rovanperä — (Finland) Jonne Halttunen	Škoda Fabia R5	1:20.4	(Finland) Kalle Rovanperä — (Finland) Jonne Halttunen
5 October	SS7	Clocaenog 2	7.67 km	(Finland) Kalle Rovanperä — (Finland) Jonne Halttunen	Škoda Fabia R5	4:15.7	(Finland) Kalle Rovanperä — (Finland) Jonne Halttunen
5 October	SS8	Brenig 2	29.13 km	(Finland) Kalle Rovanperä — (Finland) Jonne Halttunen	Škoda Fabia R5	17:29.4	(Finland) Kalle Rovanperä — (Finland) Jonne Halttunen
5 October	SS9	Penmachno 2	16.95 km	(Finland) Kalle Rovanperä — (Finland) Jonne Halttunen	Škoda Fabia R5	10:44.3	(Finland) Kalle Rovanperä — (Finland) Jonne Halttunen
6 October	SS10	Myherin 1	20.28 km	(United Kingdom) Gus Greensmith — (United States) Alessandro Gelsomino	Ford Fiesta R5	11:31.1	(Finland) Kalle Rovanperä — (Finland) Jonne Halttunen
6 October	SS11	Sweet Lamb Hafren 1	19.95 km	(Finland) Kalle Rovanperä — (Finland) Jonne Halttunen	Škoda Fabia R5	12:28.8	(Finland) Kalle Rovanperä — (Finland) Jonne Halttunen
6 October	SS12	Dyfi 1	19.48 km	(Sweden) Pontus Tidemand — (Sweden) Jonas Andersson	Škoda Fabia R5	11:37.0	(Finland) Kalle Rovanperä — (Finland) Jonne Halttunen
6 October	SS13	Gartheiniog 1	11.26 km	(Finland) Kalle Rovanperä — (Finland) Jonne Halttunen	Škoda Fabia R5	7:16.0	(Finland) Kalle Rovanperä — (Finland) Jonne Halttunen
6 October	SS14	Dyfnant	8.30 km	(Finland) Kalle Rovanperä — (Finland) Jonne Halttunen	Škoda Fabia R5	4:44.5	(Finland) Kalle Rovanperä — (Finland) Jonne Halttunen
6 October	SS15	Myherin 2	20.28 km	(Finland) Kalle Rovanperä — (Finland) Jonne Halttunen	Škoda Fabia R5	11:12.2	(Finland) Kalle Rovanperä — (Finland) Jonne Halttunen
6 October	SS16	Sweet Lamb Hafren 2	19.95 km	(Finland) Kalle Rovanperä — (Finland) Jonne Halttunen	Škoda Fabia R5	12:09.0	(Finland) Kalle Rovanperä — (Finland) Jonne Halttunen
6 October	SS17	Dyfi 2	19.48 km	(France) Eric Camilli — (France) Benjamin Veillas	Ford Fiesta R5	11:20.9	(Finland) Kalle Rovanperä — (Finland) Jonne Halttunen
6 October	SS18	Gartheiniog 2	11.26 km	(Sweden) Pontus Tidemand — (Sweden) Jonas Andersson	Škoda Fabia R5	7:09.3	(Finland) Kalle Rovanperä — (Finland) Jonne Halttunen
7 October	SS19	Elsi	10.06 km	(Finland) Kalle Rovanperä — (Finland) Jonne Halttunen	Škoda Fabia R5	7:34.0	(Finland) Kalle Rovanperä — (Finland) Jonne Halttunen
7 October	SS20	Gwydir 1	14.70 km	(Finland) Kalle Rovanperä — (Finland) Jonne Halttunen	Škoda Fabia R5	10:00.1	(Finland) Kalle Rovanperä — (Finland) Jonne Halttunen
7 October	SS21	Great Orme Llandudno 1	8.03 km	(Italy) Fabio Andolfi — (Italy) Simone Scattolin	Škoda Fabia R5	4:35.9	(Finland) Kalle Rovanperä — (Finland) Jonne Halttunen
7 October	SS22	Gwydir 2	14.70 km	(France) Eric Camilli — (France) Benjamin Veillas	Ford Fiesta R5	9:54.6	(Finland) Kalle Rovanperä — (Finland) Jonne Halttunen
7 October	SS23	Great Orme Llandudno 2	7.43 km	Stage interrupted (Note: The second running of the Great Orme Llandudno stage was interrupted when emergency services attended an incident. The stage could not be completed by all competitors.)			
World Rally Championship-3
4 October	—	Clocaenog [Shakedown]	3.32 km	(Finland) Taisko Lario — (Finland) Tatu Hämäläinen	Peugeot 208 R2	2:28.2	—N/a
4 October	SS1	Tir Prince	1.70 km	(United Kingdom) Tom Williams — (United Kingdom) Phil Hall	Ford Fiesta R2T	1:38.3	(United Kingdom) Tom Williams — (United Kingdom) Phil Hall
5 October	SS2	Clocaenog 1	7.67 km	(Finland) Taisko Lario — (Finland) Tatu Hämäläinen	Peugeot 208 R2	5:05.3	(Finland) Taisko Lario — (Finland) Tatu Hämäläinen
5 October	SS3	Brenig 1	29.13 km	(United Kingdom) Tom Williams — (United Kingdom) Phil Hall	Ford Fiesta R2T	20:33.4	(United Kingdom) Tom Williams — (United Kingdom) Phil Hall
5 October	SS4	Penmachno 1	16.95 km	(United Kingdom) Tom Williams — (United Kingdom) Phil Hall	Ford Fiesta R2T	12:34.6	(United Kingdom) Tom Williams — (United Kingdom) Phil Hall
5 October	SS5	Slate Mountain 1	1.63 km	(United Kingdom) Tom Williams — (United Kingdom) Phil Hall	Ford Fiesta R2T	1:36.9	(United Kingdom) Tom Williams — (United Kingdom) Phil Hall
5 October	SS6	Slate Mountain 2	1.63 km	(Finland) Taisko Lario — (Finland) Tatu Hämäläinen	Peugeot 208 R2	1:36.3	(United Kingdom) Tom Williams — (United Kingdom) Phil Hall
5 October	SS6	Slate Mountain 2	1.63 km	(United Kingdom) Tom Williams — (United Kingdom) Phil Hall	Ford Fiesta R2T	1:36.3	(United Kingdom) Tom Williams — (United Kingdom) Phil Hall
5 October	SS7	Clocaenog 2	7.67 km	(Finland) Taisko Lario — (Finland) Tatu Hämäläinen	Peugeot 208 R2	5:04.1	(United Kingdom) Tom Williams — (United Kingdom) Phil Hall
5 October	SS8	Brenig 2	29.13 km	(United Kingdom) Tom Williams — (United Kingdom) Phil Hall	Ford Fiesta R2T	20:24.8	(United Kingdom) Tom Williams — (United Kingdom) Phil Hall
5 October	SS9	Penmachno 2	16.95 km	(United Kingdom) Tom Williams — (United Kingdom) Phil Hall	Ford Fiesta R2T	12:43.4	(United Kingdom) Tom Williams — (United Kingdom) Phil Hall
6 October	SS10	Myherin 1	20.28 km	(United Kingdom) Tom Williams — (United Kingdom) Phil Hall	Ford Fiesta R2T	13:16.7	(United Kingdom) Tom Williams — (United Kingdom) Phil Hall
6 October	SS11	Sweet Lamb Hafren 1	19.95 km	(United Kingdom) Tom Williams — (United Kingdom) Phil Hall	Ford Fiesta R2T	14:41.5	(United Kingdom) Tom Williams — (United Kingdom) Phil Hall
6 October	SS12	Dyfi 1	19.48 km	(United Kingdom) Tom Williams — (United Kingdom) Phil Hall	Ford Fiesta R2T	13:26.7	(United Kingdom) Tom Williams — (United Kingdom) Phil Hall
6 October	SS13	Gartheiniog 1	11.26 km	(Finland) Taisko Lario — (Finland) Tatu Hämäläinen	Peugeot 208 R2	8:29.5	(United Kingdom) Tom Williams — (United Kingdom) Phil Hall
6 October	SS14	Dyfnant	8.30 km	(Finland) Taisko Lario — (Finland) Tatu Hämäläinen	Peugeot 208 R2	5:24.6	(United Kingdom) Tom Williams — (United Kingdom) Phil Hall
6 October	SS15	Myherin 2	20.28 km	(Finland) Taisko Lario — (Finland) Tatu Hämäläinen	Peugeot 208 R2	12:55.2	(United Kingdom) Tom Williams — (United Kingdom) Phil Hall
6 October	SS16	Sweet Lamb Hafren 2	19.95 km	(United Kingdom) Tom Williams — (United Kingdom) Phil Hall	Ford Fiesta R2T	13:48.4	(United Kingdom) Tom Williams — (United Kingdom) Phil Hall
6 October	SS17	Dyfi 2	19.48 km	(United Kingdom) Tom Williams — (United Kingdom) Phil Hall	Ford Fiesta R2T	12:55.0	(United Kingdom) Tom Williams — (United Kingdom) Phil Hall
6 October	SS18	Gartheiniog 2	11.26 km	(United Kingdom) Tom Williams — (United Kingdom) Phil Hall	Ford Fiesta R2T	8:14.1	(United Kingdom) Tom Williams — (United Kingdom) Phil Hall
7 October	SS19	Elsi	10.06 km	(United Kingdom) Tom Williams — (United Kingdom) Phil Hall	Ford Fiesta R2T	8:33.2	(United Kingdom) Tom Williams — (United Kingdom) Phil Hall
7 October	SS20	Gwydir 1	14.70 km	(United Kingdom) Tom Williams — (United Kingdom) Phil Hall	Ford Fiesta R2T	11:26.9	(United Kingdom) Tom Williams — (United Kingdom) Phil Hall
7 October	SS21	Great Orme Llandudno 1	8.03 km	(Finland) Taisko Lario — (Finland) Tatu Hämäläinen	Peugeot 208 R2	5:30.8	(United Kingdom) Tom Williams — (United Kingdom) Phil Hall
7 October	SS22	Gwydir 2	14.70 km	(United Kingdom) Tom Williams — (United Kingdom) Phil Hall	Ford Fiesta R2T	11:28.7	(United Kingdom) Tom Williams — (United Kingdom) Phil Hall
7 October	SS23	Great Orme Llandudno 2	7.43 km	Stage interrupted			

=== Power stage ===
The Power stage was a 14.70 km stage run on the final day of the rally. Additional World Drivers' and Co-drivers' Championship points were awarded to the five fastest crews. As the Power Stage was not the final stage of the rally, crews had to complete the event to be eligible to receive the points.

Pos.	Driver	Co-driver	Car	Time	Diff.	Pts.
1	(Finland) Jari-Matti Latvala	(Finland) Miikka Anttila	Toyota Yaris WRC	9:31.6	0.0	5
2	(Estonia) Ott Tänak	(Estonia) Martin Järveoja	Toyota Yaris WRC	9:32.4	+0.7	4
3	(France) Sébastien Ogier	(France) Julien Ingrassia	Ford Fiesta WRC	9:36.9	+5.2	3
4	(Belgium) Thierry Neuville	(Belgium) Nicolas Gilsoul	Hyundai i20 Coupe WRC	9:37.3	+5.6	2
5	(Finland) Esapekka Lappi	(Finland) Janne Ferm	Toyota Yaris WRC	9:39.9	+8.2	1

=== Penalties ===
The following crews were given time penalties during the rally.

Stage	No.	Driver	Co-driver	Entrant	Car	Class	Reason	Penalty
SS1	97	(United Kingdom) John Morrison	(United Kingdom) Peter Carstairs	(United Kingdom) John Morrison	Mitsubishi Lancer Evolution IX	National	12 minutes late	2:00
SS6	99	(United Kingdom) Scott Partridge	(United Kingdom) Fiona Scarret	(United Kingdom) Scott Partridge	Subaru Impreza	—N/a	1 minute late	0:10
SS9	83	(United Kingdom) Rhys Yates	(United Kingdom) Elliott Edmondson	(United Kingdom) Rhys Yates	Škoda Fabia R5	National	5 minutes late	0:50
SS9	91	(France) Jean-Baptiste Franceschi	(France) Romain Courbon	Équipe de France FFSA Rally	Ford Fiesta R2T	—N/a	1 minute late	0:10
SS9	95	(United Kingdom) Tony Jardine	(United Kingdom) Tom Cary	(United Kingdom) Tony Jardine	Mitsubishi Lancer Evolution IX	—N/a	3 minutes early	0:30
SS9	99	(United Kingdom) Scott Partridge	(United Kingdom) Fiona Scarret	(United Kingdom) Scott Partridge	Subaru Impreza	—N/a	1 minute early	1:00
SS9	109	(United Kingdom) Stephen Southall	(United Kingdom) Richard Bestwick	(United Kingdom) Stephen Southall	Ford Escort MK2	—N/a	3 minutes late	3:00
SS10	61	(Finland) Taisko Lario	(Finland) Tatu Hämäläinen	(Finland) Taisko Lario	Peugeot 208 R2	WRC-3	3 minutes late	0:30
SS10	106	(United Kingdom) Saleh Hijazi	(United Kingdom) Stephen Landen	(United Kingdom) Saleh Hijazi	MG ZR	—N/a	1 minute late	0:10
SS11	105	(United Kingdom) Bart Lang	(United Kingdom) Sinclair Young	(United Kingdom) Bart Lang	Ford Fiesta R2	National	3 minutes late	0:30
SS18	93	(United Kingdom) Tom Woodburn	(United Kingdom) James Williams	(United Kingdom) Tom Woodburn	Vauxhall Adam R2	National	8 minutes late	1:20
SS22	106	(United Kingdom) Saleh Hijazi	(United Kingdom) Stephen Landen	(United Kingdom) Saleh Hijazi	MG ZR	—N/a	1 minute late	0:10

=== Retirements ===
The following crews retired from the event. Under Rally2 regulations, they were eligible to re-enter the event starting from the next leg. Crews that re-entered were given an additional time penalty.

Stage	No.	Driver	Co-driver	Entrant	Car	Class	Cause	Re-entry
SS1	97	(United Kingdom) John Morrison	(United Kingdom) Peter Carstairs	(United Kingdom) John Morrison	Mitsubishi Lancer Evolution IX	National	Engine	Yes
SS2	39	(Spain) Nil Solans	(Spain) Marc Martí	(Spain) Nil Solans	Ford Fiesta R5	WRC-2	Tyres	Yes
SS2	43	(France) Eric Camilli	(France) Benjamin Veillas	(United Kingdom) M-Sport Ford WRT	Ford Fiesta R5	WRC-2	Punctures	Yes
SS2	44	(United Kingdom) Chris Ingram	(United Kingdom) Ross Whittock	(Turkey) Toksport WRT	Škoda Fabia R5	WRC-2	Mechanical	Yes
SS3	94	(United Kingdom) William Creighton	(Republic of Ireland) Liam Regan	(United Kingdom) William Creighton	Peugeot 208 R2	National	Mechanical	No
SS7	2	(United Kingdom) Elfyn Evans	(United Kingdom) Daniel Barritt	(United Kingdom) M-Sport Ford WRT	Ford Fiesta WRC	WRC	Mechanical	Yes
SS7	39	(Spain) Nil Solans	(Spain) Marc Martí	(Spain) Nil Solans	Ford Fiesta R5	WRC-2	Tyres	Yes
SS7	43	(France) Eric Camilli	(France) Benjamin Veillas	(United Kingdom) M-Sport Ford WRT	Ford Fiesta R5	WRC-2	Punctures	Yes
SS7	44	(United Kingdom) Chris Ingram	(United Kingdom) Ross Whittock	(Turkey) Toksport WRT	Škoda Fabia R5	WRC-2	Mechanical	Yes
SS7	96	(Republic of Ireland) Kevin Horgan	(United Kingdom) Liam Fouhy	(Republic of Ireland) Kevin Horgan	Škoda Fabia R2	National	Mechanical	Yes
SS7	111	(United Kingdom) Neil Andrew	(United Kingdom) Dominic Adams	(United Kingdom) Neil Andrew	Subaru Impreza	—N/a	Mechanical	Yes
SS8	110	(United Kingdom) Iwan Evans	(United Kingdom) Sion Williams	(United Kingdom) Iwan Evans	Subaru Impreza	—N/a	Mechanical	No
SS9	3	(Finland) Teemu Suninen	(Finland) Mikko Markkula	(United Kingdom) M-Sport Ford WRT	Ford Fiesta WRC	WRC	Mechanical	No
SS9	102	(United Kingdom) Spencer Wilkinson	(United Kingdom) Glyn Thomas	(United Kingdom) Spencer Wilkinson	Subaru Impreza WRX STi	National	Mechanical	Yes
SS11	88	(United Kingdom) Sacha Kakad	(United Kingdom) James Aldridge	(United Kingdom) James Aldridge	Ford Fiesta R5	National	Mechanical	No
SS11	99	(United Kingdom) Scott Partridge	(United Kingdom) Fiona Scarret	(United Kingdom) Scott Partridge	Subaru Impreza	—N/a	Mechanical	No
SS11	101	(United Kingdom) Finlay Retson	(United Kingdom) Tom Hynd	(United Kingdom) Finlay Retson	Ford Fiesta R2	National	Driveshaft	Yes
SS11	109	(United Kingdom) Stephen Southall	(United Kingdom) Richard Bestwick	(United Kingdom) Stephen Southall	Ford Escort MK2	—N/a	Driveshaft	Yes
SS15	35	(Norway) Ole Christian Veiby	(Norway) Stig Rune Skjærmoen	(France) PH Sport	Citroën C3 R5	WRC-2	Mechanical	Yes
SS15	83	(United Kingdom) Rhys Yates	(United Kingdom) Elliott Edmondson	(United Kingdom) Rhys Yates	Škoda Fabia R5	National	Off road	No
SS15	105	(United Kingdom) Bart Lang	(United Kingdom) Sinclair Young	(United Kingdom) Bart Lang	Ford Fiesta R2	WRC-2	Mechanical	Yes
SS16	8	(Estonia) Ott Tänak	(Estonia) Martin Järveoja	(Japan) Toyota Gazoo Racing WRT	Toyota Yaris WRC	WRC	Radiator	Yes
SS18	100	(United Kingdom) Peredur Davies	(United Kingdom) Jordan Reynolds	(United Kingdom) Peredur Davies	Ford Fiesta R2	WRC-2	Mechanical	Yes
SS18	107	(United Kingdom) Nabila Tejpar	(United Kingdom) Richard Bliss	(United Kingdom) Nabila Tejpar	Peugeot 208 R2	WRC-2	Mechanical	Yes
SS20	82	(United Kingdom) David Bogie	(Republic of Ireland) John Rowan	(United Kingdom) David Bogie	Škoda Fabia R5	National	Mechanical	No
SS21	38	(France) Pierre-Louis Loubet	(France) Vincent Landais	(Italy) BRC Racing Team	Hyundai i20 R5	WRC-2	Accident	No
SS21	84	(United Kingdom) Tom Cave	(United Kingdom) James Morgan	(United Kingdom) Tom Cave	Hyundai i20 R5	—N/a	Mechanical	No

=== Championship standings after the rally ===
==== Drivers' championships ====
World Rally Championship
	Pos.	Driver	Points
	1	(Belgium) Thierry Neuville	189
1	2	(France) Sébastien Ogier	182
1	3	(Estonia) Ott Tänak	168
	4	(Finland) Esapekka Lappi	104
	5	(Finland) Jari-Matti Latvala	98
World Rally Championship-2
	Pos.	Driver	Points
	1	(Czech Republic) Jan Kopecký	125
	2	(Sweden) Pontus Tidemand	111
	3	(United Kingdom) Gus Greensmith	70
4	4	(Finland) Kalle Rovanperä	65
1	5	(Poland) Łukasz Pieniążek	56
World Rally Championship-3
	Pos.	Driver	Points
	1	(Sweden) Emil Bergkvist	86
2	2	(Finland) Taisko Lario	83
1	3	(Sweden) Denis Rådström	80
1	4	(France) Jean-Baptiste Franceschi	79
	5	(Italy) Enrico Brazzoli	73

==== Co-Drivers' championships ====
World Rally Championship
	Pos.	Co-Driver	Points
	1	(Belgium) Nicolas Gilsoul	189
1	2	(France) Julien Ingrassia	182
1	3	(Estonia) Martin Järveoja	168
	4	(Finland) Janne Ferm	104
	5	(Finland) Miikka Anttila	98
World Rally Championship-2
	Pos.	Co-Driver	Points
	1	(Czech Republic) Pavel Dresler	125
	2	(Sweden) Jonas Andersson	111
5	3	(Finland) Jonne Halttunen	65
	4	(Poland) Przemysław Mazur	56
2	5	(United Kingdom) Craig Parry	55
World Rally Championship-3
	Pos.	Co-Driver	Points
2	1	(Finland) Tatu Hämäläinen	83
1	2	(Sweden) Johan Johansson	80
1	3	(France) Romain Courbon	79
	4	(Italy) Luca Beltrame	73
10	5	(United Kingdom) Phil Hall	47

==== Manufacturers' and teams' championships ====
World Rally Championship
	Pos.	Manufacturer	Points
	1	(Japan) Toyota Gazoo Racing WRT	317
	2	(South Korea) Hyundai Shell Mobis WRT	297
	3	(United Kingdom) M-Sport Ford WRT	273
	4	(France) Citroën Total Abu Dhabi WRT	187
World Rally Championship-2
	Pos.	Team	Points
	1	(Czech Republic) Škoda Motorsport II	150
	2	(Czech Republic) Škoda Motorsport	108
	3	(Finland) Printsport	81
1	4	(South Korea) Hyundai Motorsport	72
1	5	(Italy) ACI Team Italia WRC	72
World Rally Championship-3
	Pos.	Team	Points
	1	(Italy) ACI Team Italia	83
	2	(Turkey) Castrol Ford Team Turkiye	67
	3	(Estonia) OT Racing	62
	4	(Germany) ADAC Sachsen	62
	5	Équipe de France FFSA Rally	55

== Notes ==
Previous rally: 2018 Rally Turkey	2018 FIA World Rally Championship	Next rally: 2018 Rally Catalunya
Previous rally: 2017 Wales Rally GB	2018 Wales Rally GB	Next rally: 2019 Wales Rally GB
