= Zero car =

Car used in rallying to open the road

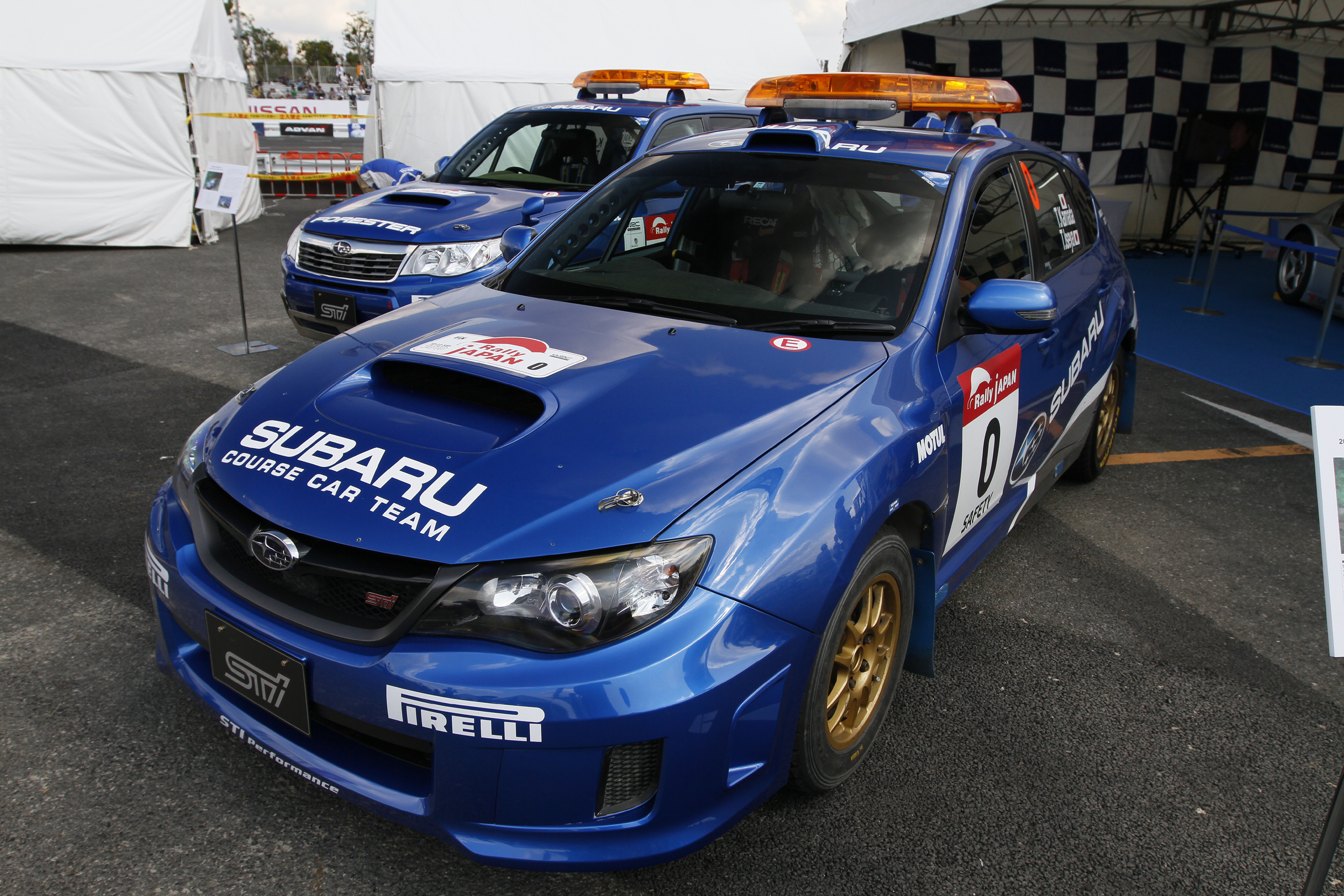
The Subaru Impreza WRX STI Zero car for the 2010 Rally Japan

A zero car (or opening car) is a car used in rallying to open the road for the competing cars.

The zero car has two main purposes:

- so that the public is not surprised by the first car and
- so that its driver can warn the organization if there is a problem on the stage.

Originally only one zero car (number zero) was used. These days it is not unusual for a rally to have two or three zero cars (numbered 000, 00 and 0). The 000 and 00 cars are sometimes called safety cars. The cars are driven through the stage in order from 000 to 0, with the 000 car going slowest and the 0 car going near race speeds. The 0 car is the last car to drive the stage before the competing cars.

The drivers are usually retired rally drivers. The cars can be ordinary production sport cars, old rally cars (which lost homologation or are simply no longer competitive) or even new models (which the manufacturer wants to test before the homologation). The driver and co-driver wear normal safety equipment (helmets, racing suits, etc.). The zero car is usually driven at almost rally pace.

Zero cars should not be confused with the organization car or the FIA inspection car, which also pass through the special stage before the rally cars, but are driven much slower.

== See also ==
- Safety car, similar cars that lead the racing pack in a reduced speed during a "caution period".
