= Jeff Case =

New Zealand cricketer (born 1990)

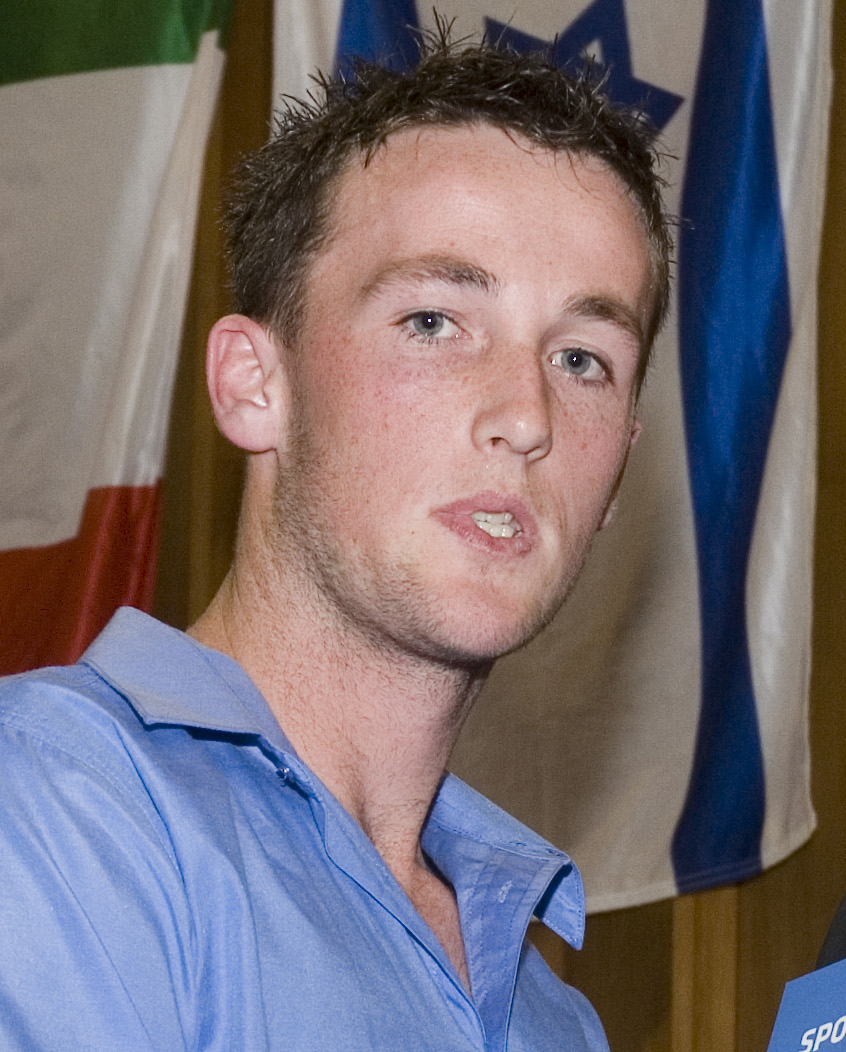
- Case in 2010

Personal information
- Born: 24 November 1990 (age 35)
- Source: Cricinfo, 10 November 2018

Jeff Case (born 24 November 1990) is a New Zealand cricketer. He made his first-class debut for Canterbury in the 2017–18 Plunket Shield season on 25 March 2018. He made his List A debut for Canterbury in the 2018–19 Ford Trophy on 10 November 2018.
