= 2018 Rally Finland =

Motor rally competition

2018 Rally Finland 68th Neste Rally Finland
Round 8 of 13 in the 2018 World Rally Championship
← Previous event	Next event →
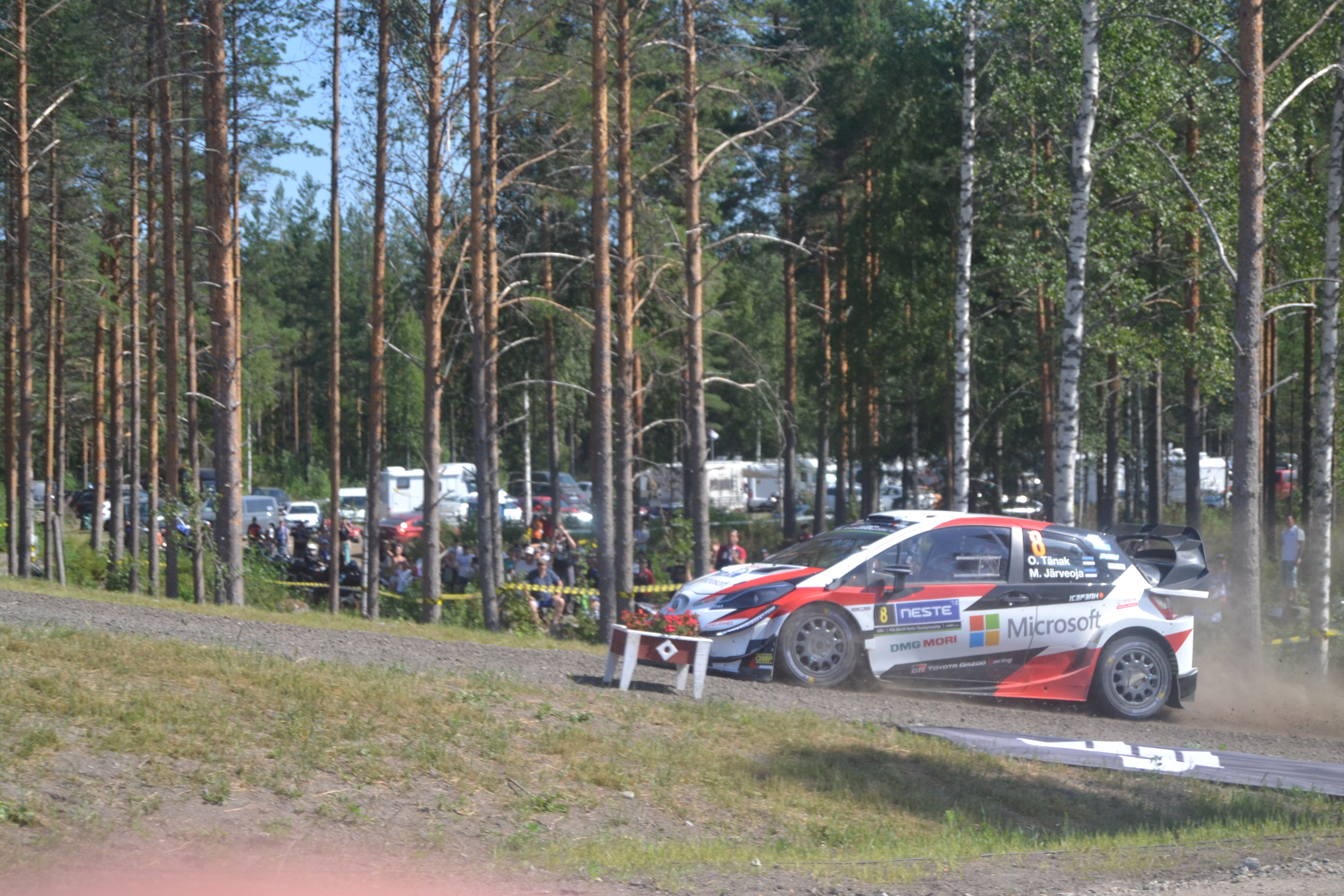
- The Toyota Yaris WRC of winners Ott Tänak and Martin Järveoja during the event.
- Host country: Finland
- Rally base: Jyväskylä, Keski-Suomi
- Dates run: 26 – 29 July 2018
- Start location: Jyväskylä, Keski-Suomi
- Finish location: Ruuhimäki, Toivakka
- Stages: 23 (317.26 km; 197.14 miles)
- Stage surface: Gravel
- Transport distance: 1,110.23 km (689.86 miles)
- Overall distance: 1,427.49 km (887.00 miles)

Statistics
- Crews registered: 72
- Crews: 67 at start, 51 at finish

Overall results
- Overall winner: (Estonia) Ott Tänak (Estonia) Martin Järveoja (Japan) Toyota Gazoo Racing WRT; 2:35:18.1
- Power Stage winner: (Estonia) Ott Tänak (Estonia) Martin Järveoja (Japan) Toyota Gazoo Racing WRT

Support category results
- WRC-2 winner: (Finland) Eerik Pietarinen (Finland) Juhana Raitanen (Finland) TGS Worldwide; 2:45:18.4
- WRC-3 winner: (Estonia) Ken Torn (Estonia) Kuldar Sikk (Estonia) OT Racing; 3:03:07.2

The 2018 Rally Finland (formally known as the Neste Rally Finland 2018) was a motor racing event for rally cars that held over four days between 26 and 29 July 2018. It marked the sixty-eighth running of Rally Finland, and was the eighth round of the 2018 FIA World Rally Championship and its support categories, the WRC-2 and WRC-3 championships, and the fourth round of the Junior WRC championship. The event was based in Jyväskylä in Central Finland and consisted of twenty-three special stages totalling 317.26 km (197.14 mi) in competitive kilometres.

Esapekka Lappi and Janne Ferm were the defending rally winners. Ott Tänak and Martin Järveoja were the rally winners. Their team, Toyota Gazoo Racing WRT, were the manufacturers' winners. The TGS Worldwide crew of Eerik Pietarinen and Juhana Raitanen won the World Rally Championship-2 category in a Škoda Fabia R5, while Estonian crew Ken Torn and Kuldar Sikk won the World Rally Championship-3.

== Background ==
=== Championship standings prior to the event ===
Thierry Neuville and Nicolas Gilsoul entered the round with a twenty-seven-point lead in the World Championship for Drivers and Co-drivers. In the World Championship for Manufacturers, Hyundai Shell Mobis WRT held a twenty-eight-point lead over M-Sport Ford WRT.

=== Entry list ===
The following crews were entered into the rally. The event was opened to crews competing in the World Rally Championship, World Rally Championship-2, and the World Rally Championship-3. The final entry list consisted of twelve World Rally Car entries, eighteen in the World Rally Championship-2, and another eighteen entries in the World Rally Championship-3, fifteen of which were eligible to score points in the Junior World Rally Championship.

No.	Entrant	Driver	Co-Driver	Car	Tyre
World Rally Car entries
1	(United Kingdom) M-Sport Ford WRT	(France) Sébastien Ogier	(France) Julien Ingrassia	Ford Fiesta WRC	MI
2	(United Kingdom) M-Sport Ford WRT	(United Kingdom) Elfyn Evans	(United Kingdom) Daniel Barritt	Ford Fiesta WRC	MI
3	(United Kingdom) M-Sport Ford WRT	(Finland) Teemu Suninen	(Finland) Mikko Markkula	Ford Fiesta WRC	MI
4	(South Korea) Hyundai Shell Mobis WRT	(Norway) Andreas Mikkelsen	(Norway) Anders Jæger-Synnevaag	Hyundai i20 Coupe WRC	MI
5	(South Korea) Hyundai Shell Mobis WRT	(Belgium) Thierry Neuville	(Belgium) Nicolas Gilsoul	Hyundai i20 Coupe WRC	MI
6	(South Korea) Hyundai Shell Mobis WRT	(New Zealand) Hayden Paddon	(United Kingdom) Sebastian Marshall	Hyundai i20 Coupe WRC	MI
7	(Japan) Toyota Gazoo Racing WRT	(Finland) Jari-Matti Latvala	(Finland) Miikka Anttila	Toyota Yaris WRC	MI
8	(Japan) Toyota Gazoo Racing WRT	(Estonia) Ott Tänak	(Estonia) Martin Järveoja	Toyota Yaris WRC	MI
9	(Japan) Toyota Gazoo Racing WRT	(Finland) Esapekka Lappi	(Finland) Janne Ferm	Toyota Yaris WRC	MI
10	(France) Citroën Total Abu Dhabi WRT	(Norway) Mads Østberg	(Norway) Torstein Eriksen	Citroën C3 WRC	MI
11	(France) Citroën Total Abu Dhabi WRT	(Republic of Ireland) Craig Breen	(United Kingdom) Scott Martin	Citroën C3 WRC	MI
12	(France) Citroën Total Abu Dhabi WRT	(United Arab Emirates) Khalid Al-Qassimi	(United Kingdom) Chris Patterson	Citroën C3 WRC	MI
World Rally Championship-2 entries
31	(Czech Republic) Škoda Motorsport	(Norway) Ole Christian Veiby	(Norway) Stig Rune Skjærmoen	Škoda Fabia R5	MI
32	(United Kingdom) Gus Greensmith	(United Kingdom) Gus Greensmith	(United Kingdom) Craig Parry	Ford Fiesta R5	MI
33	(Finland) Tommi Mäkinen Racing	(Japan) Takamoto Katsuta	(Finland) Marko Salminen	Ford Fiesta R5	MI
34	(Italy) ACI Team Italia WRC	(Italy) Fabio Andolfi	(Italy) Simone Scattolin	Škoda Fabia R5	P
35	(Italy) BRC Racing Team	(France) Pierre-Louis Loubet	(France) Vincent Landais	Hyundai i20 R5	MI
36	(France) Citroën Total Rallye Team	(France) Stéphane Lefebvre	(France) Gabin Moreau	Citroën C3 R5	MI
37	(Finland) Tommi Mäkinen Racing	(Japan) Hiroki Arai	(Finland) Jarmo Lehtinen	Ford Fiesta R5	MI
38	(South Korea) Hyundai Motorsport	(Finland) Jari Huttunen	(Finland) Antti Linnaketo	Hyundai i20 R5	MI
39	(France) Nicolas Ciamin	(France) Nicolas Ciamin	(France) Thibault de la Haye	Hyundai i20 R5	MI
40	(Italy) Motorsport Italia	(Mexico) Benito Guerra	(Spain) Borja Rozada	Škoda Fabia R5	P
41	(Czech Republic) Škoda Motorsport	(Finland) Kalle Rovanperä	(Finland) Jonne Halttunen	Škoda Fabia R5	MI
42	(Sweden) Lars Stugemo	(Sweden) Lars Stugemo	(Sweden) Kalle Lexe	Škoda Fabia R5	P
43	(Turkey) Castrol Ford Team Türkiye	(Turkey) Murat Bostanci	(Turkey) Onur Vatansever	Ford Fiesta R5	P
44	(France) Citroën Total Rallye Team	(Romania) Simone Tempestini	(Romania) Sergiu Itu	Citroën C3 R5	MI
45	(Finland) TGS Worldwide	(Finland) Eerik Pietarinen	(Finland) Juhana Raitanen	Škoda Fabia R5	MI
46	(Finland) Printsport	(Finland) Emil Lindholm	(Finland) Mikael Korhonen	Škoda Fabia R5	MI
47	(Finland) Tommi Mäkinen Racing 2	(Finland) Jarkko Nikara	(Japan) Sayaka Adachi	Ford Fiesta R5	MI
48	(United Kingdom) M-Sport Ford WRT	(Finland) Jouni Virtanen	(Finland) Enni Mälkönen	Ford Fiesta R5	MI
World Rally Championship-3 entries
61	(Sweden) Denis Rådström	(Sweden) Denis Rådström^{‡}	(Sweden) Johan Johansson	Ford Fiesta R2T	P
62	(Sweden) Emil Bergkvist	(Sweden) Emil Bergkvist^{‡}	(Sweden) Joakim Sjöberg	Ford Fiesta R2T	P
63	Équipe de France FFSA Rally	(France) Jean-Baptiste Franceschi^{‡}	(France) Romain Courbon	Ford Fiesta R2T	P
64	(France) Terry Folb	(France) Terry Folb^{‡}	(France) Kevin Bronner	Ford Fiesta R2T	P
65	(Italy) ACI Team Italia	(Italy) Luca Bottarelli^{‡}	(Italy) Manuel Fenoli	Ford Fiesta R2T	P
66	(Germany) ADAC Sachsen	(Germany) Julius Tannert^{‡}	(Austria) Jürgen Heigl	Ford Fiesta R2T	P
67	(Italy) ACI Team Italia	(Italy) Enrico Oldrati^{‡}	(Italy) Danilo Fappani	Ford Fiesta R2T	P
68	(Republic of Ireland) Callum Devine	(Republic of Ireland) Callum Devine^{‡}	(Republic of Ireland) Brian Hoy	Ford Fiesta R2T	P
69	(New Zealand) Holder Brothers Racing	(New Zealand) David Holder^{‡}	(New Zealand) Jason Farmer	Ford Fiesta R2T	P
70	(Turkey) Castrol Ford Team Turkiye	(Turkey) Bugra Banaz^{‡}	(Turkey) Burak Erdener	Ford Fiesta R2T	P
71	(Estonia) OT Racing	(Estonia) Ken Torn^{‡}	(Estonia) Kuldar Sikk	Ford Fiesta R2T	P
72	(Chile) Emilio Fernández	(Chile) Emilio Fernández^{‡}	(Chile) Joaquin Riquelme	Ford Fiesta R2T	P
73	(United Kingdom) Tom Williams	(United Kingdom) Tom Williams^{‡}	(United Kingdom) Phil Hall	Ford Fiesta R2T	P
74	(Italy) Umberto Accornero	(Italy) Umberto Accornero^{‡}	(Italy) Maurizio Barone	Ford Fiesta R2T	P
75	(Finland) Team Flying Finn	(Finland) Henri Hokkala^{‡}	(Finland) Kimmo Pahkala	Ford Fiesta R2T	P
76	(Finland) Taisko Lario	(Finland) Taisko Lario	(Finland) Tatu Hämäläinen	Peugeot 208 R2	P
77	(United Kingdom) Louise Cook	(United Kingdom) Louise Cook	(United Kingdom) Stefan Davis	Citroën DS3 R3T	MI
78	(United Kingdom) Darren Garrod	(India) Sanjay Takale	(United Kingdom) Darren Garrod	Ford Fiesta R2	P
Other major entries
83	(Finland) Printsport	(Poland) Łukasz Pieniążek	(Poland) Przemysław Mazur	Škoda Fabia R5	MI
89	(India) Team MRF Tyres	(India) Gaurav Gill	(Australia) Glenn MacNeall	Ford Fiesta R5	MR

Notes

- ^‡ — Driver and co-driver are eligible to score points in the FIA Junior World Rally Championship.

== Report ==
=== Pre-event ===
Following Citroën's sacking of Kris Meeke, the team promoted Mads Østberg and Torstein Eriksen to replace him and his co-driver Paul Nagle as lead drivers.

=== Thursday ===
Ott Tänak, driving a Yaris, took a 0.7-second lead over championship leader Thierry Neuville, while defending world champion Sébastien Ogier was 0.1 second further behind. Andreas Mikkelsen was in fourth place in another Hyundai i20, another slender 0.1 second behind, while defending rally winner Esapekka Lappi was in fifth. Shakedown top two Mads Østberg and Craig Breen tied in sixth, followed by local Finn Jari-Matti Latvala. Hayden Paddon and Elfyn Evans cleared the stage in ninth and tenth respectively.

=== Friday ===
Friday witnessed a great fight between Ott Tänak, who drove a Yaris, and Mads Østberg, who drove a C3. After rally leader changed several times, the Estonian ended the day with a 5.8-second lead. Local Finn Jari-Matti Latvala completed the day in third, with Hayden Paddon led Hyundai in fourth position after Teemu Suninen fell back in the final stage of the day with brake issues in his Fiesta. Title contender Sébastien Ogier, who was second on the road, climbed up to sixth overall after Ford gave his teammate Elfyn Evans a team order, which ordered him to slow down in SS10 before reaching the finish line. Defending rally winner Esapekka Lappi, who stalled his car at the opening stage of the day, cleared the day in eighth place, while Craig Breen, who suffered an early puncture and a late fuel pressure issue, completed the day in ninth. Championship leader Thierry Neuville, who struggled for grip all the day due to being first on the road, completed the leaderboard. Teammate Andreas Mikkelsen finished down the order after rolling his i20.

=== Saturday ===
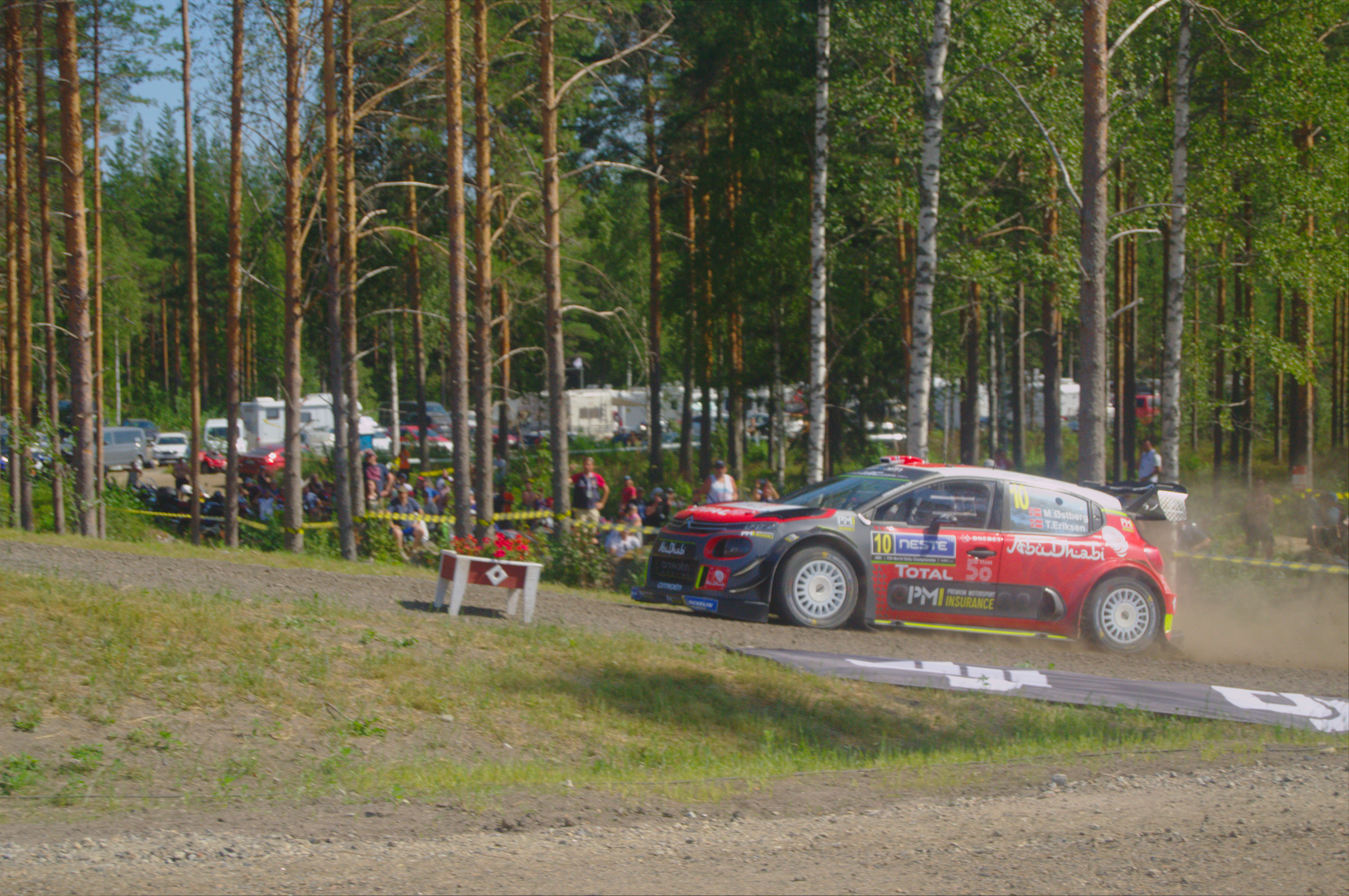
Rally runner-up Mads Østberg and Torstein Eriksen crew during the event.

Saturday in Rally Finland was dominated by three Yarises. Ott Tänak, who stormed away with a 39-second over Mads Østberg, Jari-Matti Latvala, who closed the gap the Norwegian to only 5.4 seconds, and Esapekka Lappi, who climbed up four places after his effort, took all eight stage victories of the day to make Toyota a 1-3-4 finish. Hayden Paddon, who led Hyundai in fifth place, manage to stay ahead of local Finn Teemu Suninen despite brake problems and high tyre wear. Defending world champion Sébastien Ogier, who struggled to come to terms with new shock absorbers and an upgraded aerodynamic package, and teammate Elfyn Evans cleared the day in seventh and eighth respectively, while Craig Breen completed the day in ninth overall in another C3. Championship leader Thierry Neuville, who failed to make up yesterday's lost time, completed the leaderboard in tenth place.

=== Sunday ===
Ott Tänak took his second rally victory of the season with a Power Stage win in Finland to gain a maximum thirty points after a master-class performance. Mads Østberg edged Jari-Matti Latvala by only 2.8 seconds to finish second overall. Hayden Paddon completed the rally in fourth place after defending rally winner Esapekka Lappi went off in SS20. Sébastien Ogier climbed up to fifth place after Ford gave another team order to Teemu Suninen, who was ordered to check in late at a time control so that he was given a 20-second time penalty and dropped behind his five-time world champion teammate in sixth. Elfyn Evans finished in seventh in another Fiesta, followed by Craig Breen in eighth. Championship leader Thierry Neuville ended his rally ahead of his teammate Andreas Mikkelsen in ninth place. Despite an unsatisfied outcome, he still leads the championship by twenty-one points over the defending world champion.

== Classification ==
=== Top ten finishers ===
The following crews finished the rally in each class's top ten. (Note: Only crews contesting the World Rally Championship, World Rally Championship-2 and World Rally Championship-3 are listed.)

Position		No.	Driver	Co-driver	Entrant	Car	Time	Difference	Points	
Event	Class	No.	Driver	Co-driver	Entrant	Car	Time	Difference	Class	Stage
Overall classification
1	1	8	(Estonia) Ott Tänak	(Estonia) Martin Järveoja	(Japan) Toyota Gazoo Racing WRT	Toyota Yaris WRC	2:35:18.1	0.0	25	5
2	2	10	(Norway) Mads Østberg	(Norway) Torstein Eriksen	(France) Citroën Total Abu Dhabi WRT	Citroën C3 WRC	2:35:50.8	+32.7	18	4
3	3	7	(Finland) Jari-Matti Latvala	(Finland) Miikka Anttila	(Japan) Toyota Gazoo Racing WRT	Toyota Yaris WRC	2:35:53.6	+35.5	15	3
4	4	6	(New Zealand) Hayden Paddon	(United Kingdom) Sebastian Marshall	(South Korea) Hyundai Shell Mobis WRT	Hyundai i20 Coupe WRC	2:36:53.7	+1:35.6	12	0
5	5	1	(France) Sébastien Ogier	(France) Julien Ingrassia	(United Kingdom) M-Sport Ford WRT	Ford Fiesta WRC	2:37:33.1	+2:15.0	10	0
6	6	3	(Finland) Teemu Suninen	(Finland) Mikko Markkula	(United Kingdom) M-Sport Ford WRT	Ford Fiesta WRC	2:37:37.3	+2:19.2	8	0
7	7	2	(United Kingdom) Elfyn Evans	(United Kingdom) Phil Mills	(United Kingdom) M-Sport Ford WRT	Ford Fiesta WRC	2:37:47.6	+2:29.5	6	0
8	8	11	(Republic of Ireland) Craig Breen	(United Kingdom) Scott Martin	(France) Citroën Total Abu Dhabi WRT	Citroën C3 WRC	2:38:26.5	+3:08.4	4	1
9	9	5	(Belgium) Thierry Neuville	(Belgium) Nicolas Gilsoul	(South Korea) Hyundai Shell Mobis WRT	Hyundai i20 Coupe WRC	2:39:09.9	+3:51.8	2	2
10	10	4	(Norway) Andreas Mikkelsen	(Norway) Anders Jæger-Synnevaag	(South Korea) Hyundai Shell Mobis WRT	Hyundai i20 Coupe WRC	2:43:55.5	+8:37.4	1	0
World Rally Championship-2
11	1	45	(Finland) Eerik Pietarinen	(Finland) Juhana Raitanen	(Finland) TGS Worldwide	Škoda Fabia R5	2:45:18.4	0.0	25	—
12	2	38	(Finland) Jari Huttunen	(Finland) Antti Linnaketo	(South Korea) Hyundai Motorsport	Hyundai i20 R5	2:46:25.2	+1:06.8	18	—
13	3	32	(United Kingdom) Gus Greensmith	(United Kingdom) Craig Parry	(United Kingdom) Gus Greensmith	Ford Fiesta R5	2:47:53.3	+2:34.9	15	—
14	4	41	(Finland) Kalle Rovanperä	(Finland) Jonne Halttunen	(Czech Republic) Škoda Motorsport	Škoda Fabia R5	2:47:55.2	+2:36.8	12	—
15	5	35	(France) Pierre-Louis Loubet	(France) Vincent Landais	(Italy) BRC Racing Team	Hyundai i20 R5	2:49:23.4	+4:05.0	10	—
18	6	40	(Mexico) Benito Guerra	(Spain) Borja Rozada	(Italy) Motorsport Italia	Škoda Fabia R5	2:56:40.6	+11:22.2	8	—
23	7	37	(Japan) Hiroki Arai	(Finland) Jarmo Lehtinen	(Finland) Tommi Mäkinen Racing	Ford Fiesta R5	3:06:43.7	+21:25.3	6	—
29	8	34	(Italy) Fabio Andolfi	(Italy) Simone Scattolin	(Italy) ACI Team Italia WRC	Škoda Fabia R5	3:18:08.6	+32:50.2	4	—
36	9	44	(Romania) Simone Tempestini	(Romania) Sergiu Itu	(France) Citroën Total Rallye Team	Citroën C3 R5	3:31:05.5	+45:47.1	2	—
38	10	43	(Turkey) Murat Bostanci	(Turkey) Onur Vatansever	(Turkey) Castrol Ford Team Türkiye	Ford Fiesta R5	3:42:31.8	+57:13.4	1	—
World Rally Championship-3
19	1	71	(Estonia) Ken Torn	(Estonia) Kuldar Sikk	(Estonia) OT Racing	Ford Fiesta R2T	3:03:07.2	0.0	25	—
20	2	62	(Sweden) Emil Bergkvist	(Sweden) Joakim Sjöberg	(Sweden) Emil Bergkvist	Ford Fiesta R2T	3:03:17.1	+9.9	18	—
21	3	63	(France) Jean-Baptiste Franceschi	(France) Romain Courbon	Équipe de France FFSA Rally	Ford Fiesta R2T	3:04:53.4	+1:46.2	15	—
24	4	66	(Italy) Enrico Oldrati	(Italy) Danilo Fappani	(Italy) ACI Team Italia	Ford Fiesta R2T	3:07:15.3	+4:08.1	12	—
25	5	68	(Republic of Ireland) Callum Devine	(Republic of Ireland) Brian Hoy	(Republic of Ireland) Callum Devine	Ford Fiesta R2T	3:09:14.1	+6:06.9	10	—
26	6	73	(United Kingdom) Tom Williams	(United Kingdom) Phil Hall	(United Kingdom) Tom Williams	Ford Fiesta R2T	3:13:12.4	+10:05.2	8	—
27	7	76	(Finland) Taisko Lario	(Finland) Tatu Hämäläinen	(Finland) Taisko Lario	Peugeot 208 R2	3:14:41.0	+11:33.8	6	—
28	8	70	(Turkey) Bugra Banaz	(Turkey) Burak Erdener	(Turkey) Castrol Ford Team Turkiye	Ford Fiesta R2T	3:14:49.9	+11:42.7	4	—
32	9	67	(Italy) Enrico Oldrati	(Italy) Danilo Fappani	(Italy) ACI Team Italia	Ford Fiesta R2T	3:20:35.9	+17:28.7	2	—
33	10	69	(New Zealand) David Holder	(New Zealand) Jason Farmer	(New Zealand) Holder Brothers Racing	Ford Fiesta R2T	3:25:24.5	+22:17.3	1	—
Junior World Rally Championship
19	1	71	(Estonia) Ken Torn	(Estonia) Kuldar Sikk	(Estonia) OT Racing	Ford Fiesta R2T	3:03:07.2	0.0	25	9
20	2	62	(Sweden) Emil Bergkvist	(Sweden) Joakim Sjöberg	(Sweden) Emil Bergkvist	Ford Fiesta R2T	3:03:17.1	+9.9	18	12
21	3	63	(France) Jean-Baptiste Franceschi	(France) Romain Courbon	Équipe de France FFSA Rally	Ford Fiesta R2T	3:04:53.4	+1:46.2	15	0
24	4	66	(Germany) Julius Tannert	(Germany) ADAC Sachsen	(Austria) Jürgen Heigl	Ford Fiesta R2T	3:07:15.3	+4:08.1	12	0
25	5	68	(Republic of Ireland) Callum Devine	(Republic of Ireland) Brian Hoy	(Republic of Ireland) Callum Devine	Ford Fiesta R2T	3:09:14.1	+6:06.9	10	0
26	6	73	(United Kingdom) Tom Williams	(United Kingdom) Phil Hall	(United Kingdom) Tom Williams	Ford Fiesta R2T	3:13:12.4	+10:05.2	8	0
28	7	70	(Turkey) Bugra Banaz	(Turkey) Burak Erdener	(Turkey) Castrol Ford Team Turkiye	Ford Fiesta R2T	3:14:49.9	+11:42.7	6	0
32	8	67	(Italy) Enrico Oldrati	(Italy) Danilo Fappani	(Italy) ACI Team Italia	Ford Fiesta R2T	3:20:35.9	+17:28.7	4	0
33	9	69	(New Zealand) David Holder	(New Zealand) Jason Farmer	(New Zealand) Holder Brothers Racing	Ford Fiesta R2T	3:25:24.5	+22:17.3	2	0
34	10	74	(Italy) Umberto Accornero	(Italy) Maurizio Barone	(Italy) Umberto Accornero	Ford Fiesta R2T	3:29:50.8	+26:43.6	1	0

=== Other notable finishers ===
The following notable crews finished the rally outside top ten.

Position		No.	Driver	Co-driver	Entrant	Car	Class	Time	Points
Event	Class	No.	Driver	Co-driver	Entrant	Car	Class	Time	Stage
34	11	74	(Italy) Umberto Accornero	(Italy) Maurizio Barone	(Italy) Umberto Accornero	Ford Fiesta R2T	WRC-3	3:29:50.8	0
37	37	12	(United Arab Emirates) Khalid Al-Qassimi	(United Kingdom) Chris Patterson	(France) Citroën Total Abu Dhabi WRT	Citroën C3 WRC	WRC	3:41:28.3	0
39	11	65	(Italy) Luca Bottarelli	(Italy) Manuel Fenoli	(Italy) ACI Team Italia	Ford Fiesta R2T	J-WRC	3:43:17.8	0
39	12	65	(Italy) Luca Bottarelli	(Italy) Manuel Fenoli	(Italy) ACI Team Italia	Ford Fiesta R2T	WRC-3	3:43:17.8	—
40	11	46	(Finland) Emil Lindholm	(Finland) Mikael Korhonen	(Finland) Printsport	Škoda Fabia R5	WRC-2	3:45:52.4	—
43	12	42	(Sweden) Lars Stugemo	(Sweden) Kalle Lexe	(Sweden) Lars Stugemo	Škoda Fabia R5	WRC-2	3:52:21.1	—
44	13	36	(France) Stéphane Lefebvre	(France) Gabin Moreau	(France) Citroën Total Rallye Team	Citroën C3 R5	WRC-2	3:52:46.8	—
45	12	64	(France) Terry Folb	(France) Kevin Bronner	(France) Terry Folb	Ford Fiesta R2T	J-WRC	3:53:24.6	0
45	13	64	(France) Terry Folb	(France) Kevin Bronner	(France) Terry Folb	Ford Fiesta R2T	WRC-3	3:53:24.6	—
47	14	78	(United Kingdom) Darren Garrod	(India) Sanjay Takale	(United Kingdom) Darren Garrod	Ford Fiesta R2	WRC-3	3:55:20.3	—
48	14	47	(Finland) Jarkko Nikara	(Japan) Sayaka Adachi	(Finland) Tommi Mäkinen Racing 2	Ford Fiesta R5	WRC-2	3:55:24.2	—
50	13	72	(Chile) Emilio Fernández	(Chile) Joaquin Riquelme	(Chile) Emilio Fernández	Ford Fiesta R2T	J-WRC	4:28:54.6	0
50	15	72	(Chile) Emilio Fernández	(Chile) Joaquin Riquelme	(Chile) Emilio Fernández	Ford Fiesta R2T	WRC-3	4:28:54.6	—
51	15	48	(Finland) Jouni Virtanen	(Finland) Enni Mälkönen	(United Kingdom) M-Sport Ford WRT	Ford Fiesta R5	WRC-2	4:35:58.2	—

=== Special stages ===
Overall classification
Day	Stage	Name	Length	Winner	Car	Time	Class leader
26 July	—	Vesala [Shakedown]	4.26 km	(Norway) Mads Østberg	Citroën C3 WRC	1:54.8	—N/a
26 July	SS1	Harju 1	2.31 km	(Estonia) Ott Tänak	Toyota Yaris WRC	1:49.2	(Estonia) Ott Tänak
27 July	SS2	Moksi 1	20.04 km	(Estonia) Ott Tänak	Toyota Yaris WRC	9:56.1	(Estonia) Ott Tänak
27 July	SS3	Urria 1	12.28 km	(Finland) Jari-Matti Latvala	Toyota Yaris WRC	6:09.8	(Estonia) Ott Tänak
27 July	SS4	Ässämäki 1	12.33 km	(Norway) Mads Østberg	Citroën C3 WRC	5:49.1	(Norway) Mads Østberg
27 July	SS5	Äänekoski 1	7.71 km	(Estonia) Ott Tänak	Toyota Yaris WRC	3:32.1	(Estonia) Ott Tänak
27 July	SS6	Oittila	19.34 km	(Norway) Mads Østberg	Citroën C3 WRC	9:45.3	(Norway) Mads Østberg
27 July	SS7	Moksi 2	20.04 km	(Estonia) Ott Tänak (Norway) Mads Østberg	Toyota Yaris WRC; Citroën C3 WRC	9:49.3	(Norway) Mads Østberg
27 July	SS8	Urria 2	12.28 km	(Republic of Ireland) Craig Breen	Citroën C3 WRC	6:07.0	(Norway) Mads Østberg
27 July	SS9	Ässämäki 2	12.33 km	(Estonia) Ott Tänak	Toyota Yaris WRC	5:47.0	(Estonia) Ott Tänak
27 July	SS10	Äänekoski 2	7.71 km	(Estonia) Ott Tänak	Toyota Yaris WRC	3:29.1	(Estonia) Ott Tänak
27 July	SS11	Harju 2	2.31 km	(France) Sébastien Ogier	Ford Fiesta WRC	1:48.7	(Estonia) Ott Tänak
28 July	SS12	Päijälä 1	23.92 km	(Estonia) Ott Tänak	Toyota Yaris WRC	11:36.4	(Estonia) Ott Tänak
28 July	SS13	Pihlajakoski 1	14.90 km	(Estonia) Ott Tänak	Toyota Yaris WRC	6:50.8	(Estonia) Ott Tänak
28 July	SS14	Kakaristo 1	23.66 km	(Estonia) Ott Tänak	Toyota Yaris WRC	11:40.4	(Estonia) Ott Tänak
28 July	SS15	Tuohikotanen 1	8.95 km	(Estonia) Ott Tänak	Toyota Yaris WRC	4:31.5	(Estonia) Ott Tänak
28 July	SS16	Tuohikotanen 2	8.95 km	(Finland) Jari-Matti Latvala (Estonia) Ott Tänak	Toyota Yaris WRC; Toyota Yaris WRC	4:26.0	(Estonia) Ott Tänak
28 July	SS17	Kakaristo 2	23.66 km	(Finland) Esapekka Lappi	Toyota Yaris WRC	11:26.3	(Estonia) Ott Tänak
28 July	SS18	Päijälä 2	23.92 km	(Finland) Esapekka Lappi	Toyota Yaris WRC	11:31.1	(Estonia) Ott Tänak
28 July	SS19	Pihlajakoski 2	14.90 km	(Finland) Esapekka Lappi	Toyota Yaris WRC	6:50.4	(Estonia) Ott Tänak
29 July	SS20	Laukaa 1	11.74 km	(Norway) Mads Østberg	Citroën C3 WRC	5:28.4	(Estonia) Ott Tänak
29 July	SS21	Ruuhimäki 1	11.12 km	(Finland) Jari-Matti Latvala	Toyota Yaris WRC	5:32.9	(Estonia) Ott Tänak
29 July	SS22	Laukaa 2	11.74 km	(Finland) Jari-Matti Latvala	Toyota Yaris WRC	5:21.8	(Estonia) Ott Tänak
29 July	SS23	Ruuhimäki 2 [Power stage]	11.12 km	(Estonia) Ott Tänak	Toyota Yaris WRC	5:26.2	(Estonia) Ott Tänak
World Rally Championship-2
26 July	—	Vesala [Shakedown]	4.26 km	(Norway) Ole Christian Veiby	Škoda Fabia R5	2:02.9	—N/a
26 July	SS1	Harju 1	2.31 km	(Italy) Fabio Andolfi	Škoda Fabia R5	1:54.1	(Italy) Fabio Andolfi
27 July	SS2	Moksi 1	20.04 km	(Finland) Kalle Rovanperä	Škoda Fabia R5	10:25.5	(Finland) Kalle Rovanperä
27 July	SS3	Urria 1	12.28 km	(Finland) Kalle Rovanperä	Škoda Fabia R5	6:29.4	(Finland) Kalle Rovanperä
27 July	SS4	Ässämäki 1	12.33 km	(Finland) Kalle Rovanperä	Škoda Fabia R5	6:10.2	(Finland) Kalle Rovanperä
27 July	SS5	Äänekoski 1	7.71 km	(Finland) Eerik Pietarinen	Škoda Fabia R5	3:43.3	(Finland) Kalle Rovanperä
27 July	SS6	Oittila	19.34 km	(Finland) Emil Lindholm	Škoda Fabia R5	10:22.0	(Finland) Kalle Rovanperä
27 July	SS7	Moksi 2	20.04 km	(Finland) Kalle Rovanperä	Škoda Fabia R5	10:18.5	(Finland) Kalle Rovanperä
27 July	SS8	Urria 2	12.28 km	(Finland) Kalle Rovanperä	Škoda Fabia R5	6:28.8	(Finland) Kalle Rovanperä
27 July	SS9	Ässämäki 2	12.33 km	(Finland) Kalle Rovanperä	Škoda Fabia R5	6:14.3	(Finland) Kalle Rovanperä
27 July	SS10	Äänekoski 2	7.71 km	(Finland) Eerik Pietarinen	Škoda Fabia R5	3:42.4	(Finland) Kalle Rovanperä
27 July	SS11	Harju 2	2.31 km	(Finland) Kalle Rovanperä	Škoda Fabia R5	1:52.9	(Finland) Kalle Rovanperä
28 July	SS12	Päijälä 1	23.92 km	(Finland) Kalle Rovanperä	Škoda Fabia R5	12:17.1	(Finland) Kalle Rovanperä
28 July	SS13	Pihlajakoski 1	14.90 km	(Finland) Eerik Pietarinen	Škoda Fabia R5	7:19.8	(Finland) Kalle Rovanperä
28 July	SS14	Kakaristo 1	23.66 km	(Finland) Kalle Rovanperä	Škoda Fabia R5	12:20.0	(Finland) Kalle Rovanperä
28 July	SS15	Tuohikotanen 1	8.95 km	(Finland) Kalle Rovanperä	Škoda Fabia R5	4:48.1	(Finland) Kalle Rovanperä
28 July	SS16	Tuohikotanen 2	8.95 km	(Finland) Kalle Rovanperä	Škoda Fabia R5	4:43.2	(Finland) Kalle Rovanperä
28 July	SS17	Kakaristo 2	23.66 km	(Finland) Kalle Rovanperä	Škoda Fabia R5	12:08.0	(Finland) Kalle Rovanperä
28 July	SS18	Päijälä 2	23.92 km	(Finland) Eerik Pietarinen	Škoda Fabia R5	12:17.1	(Finland) Kalle Rovanperä
28 July	SS19	Pihlajakoski 2	14.90 km	(Finland) Eerik Pietarinen	Škoda Fabia R5	7:19.8	(Finland) Eerik Pietarinen
29 July	SS20	Laukaa 1	11.74 km	(Finland) Kalle Rovanperä	Škoda Fabia R5	5:43.5	(Finland) Eerik Pietarinen
29 July	SS21	Ruuhimäki 1	11.12 km	(Finland) Kalle Rovanperä	Škoda Fabia R5	5:46.1	(Finland) Eerik Pietarinen
29 July	SS22	Laukaa 2	11.74 km	(Finland) Kalle Rovanperä	Škoda Fabia R5	5:36.7	(Finland) Eerik Pietarinen
29 July	SS23	Ruuhimäki 2	11.12 km	(Finland) Kalle Rovanperä	Škoda Fabia R5	5:40.4	(Finland) Eerik Pietarinen
World Rally Championship-3 / Junior World Rally Championship
26 July	—	Vesala [Shakedown]	4.26 km	(Sweden) Emil Bergkvist	Ford Fiesta R2T	2:20.0	—N/a
26 July	SS1	Harju 1	2.31 km	(Estonia) Ken Torn	Ford Fiesta R2T	2:08.3	(Estonia) Ken Torn
27 July	SS2	Moksi 1	20.04 km	(Sweden) Emil Bergkvist	Ford Fiesta R2T	11:39.3	(Sweden) Emil Bergkvist
27 July	SS3	Urria 1	12.28 km	(Sweden) Emil Bergkvist	Ford Fiesta R2T	7:16.7	(Sweden) Emil Bergkvist
27 July	SS4	Ässämäki 1	12.33 km	(Sweden) Emil Bergkvist	Ford Fiesta R2T	27:56.2	(Sweden) Emil Bergkvist
27 July	SS5	Äänekoski 1	7.71 km	(Finland) Henri Hokkala	Ford Fiesta R2T	4:05.2	(Sweden) Emil Bergkvist
27 July	SS6	Oittila	19.34 km	(Finland) Henri Hokkala	Ford Fiesta R2T	11:21.0	(Sweden) Emil Bergkvist
27 July	SS7	Moksi 2	20.04 km	(Sweden) Emil Bergkvist	Ford Fiesta R2T	11:33.1	(Sweden) Emil Bergkvist
27 July	SS8	Urria 2	12.28 km	(Sweden) Emil Bergkvist	Ford Fiesta R2T	7:14.3	(Sweden) Emil Bergkvist
27 July	SS9	Ässämäki 2	12.33 km	(Estonia) Ken Torn	Ford Fiesta R2T	6:54.2	(Estonia) Ken Torn
27 July	SS10	Äänekoski 2	7.71 km	(Sweden) Emil Bergkvist	Ford Fiesta R2T	4:02.5	(Estonia) Ken Torn
27 July	SS11	Harju 2	2.31 km	(Estonia) Ken Torn	Ford Fiesta R2T	2:06.3	(Estonia) Ken Torn
28 July	SS12	Päijälä 1	23.92 km	(Estonia) Ken Torn	Ford Fiesta R2T	13:38.6	(Estonia) Ken Torn
28 July	SS13	Pihlajakoski 1	14.90 km	(Sweden) Emil Bergkvist	Ford Fiesta R2T	8:11.3	(Estonia) Ken Torn
28 July	SS14	Kakaristo 1	23.66 km	(Sweden) Emil Bergkvist	Ford Fiesta R2T	13:35.5	(Estonia) Ken Torn
28 July	SS15	Tuohikotanen 1	8.95 km	(Sweden) Emil Bergkvist	Ford Fiesta R2T	5:21.8	(Estonia) Ken Torn
28 July	SS16	Tuohikotanen 2	8.95 km	(Estonia) Ken Torn	Ford Fiesta R2T	5:19.6	(Estonia) Ken Torn
28 July	SS17	Kakaristo 2	23.66 km	(Estonia) Ken Torn	Ford Fiesta R2T	13:25.4	(Estonia) Ken Torn
28 July	SS18	Päijälä 2	23.92 km	(Sweden) Emil Bergkvist	Ford Fiesta R2T	13:41.6	(Estonia) Ken Torn
28 July	SS19	Pihlajakoski 2	14.90 km	(Estonia) Ken Torn	Ford Fiesta R2T	8:07.2	(Estonia) Ken Torn
29 July	SS20	Laukaa 1	11.74 km	(Sweden) Emil Bergkvist	Ford Fiesta R2T	6:26.5	(Estonia) Ken Torn
29 July	SS21	Ruuhimäki 1	11.12 km	(Sweden) Emil Bergkvist	Ford Fiesta R2T	6:34.2	(Estonia) Ken Torn
29 July	SS22	Laukaa 2	11.74 km	(Estonia) Ken Torn	Ford Fiesta R2T	6:15.9	(Estonia) Ken Torn
29 July	SS23	Ruuhimäki 2	11.12 km	(Estonia) Ken Torn	Ford Fiesta R2T	6:29.3	(Estonia) Ken Torn

=== Power stage ===
The Power stage was an 11.12 km stage at the end of the rally. Additional World Championship points were awarded to the five fastest crews.

Pos.	Driver	Co-driver	Car	Time	Diff.	Pts.
1	(Estonia) Ott Tänak	(Estonia) Martin Järveoja	Toyota Yaris WRC	5:26.2	0.0	5
2	(Norway) Mads Østberg	(Norway) Torstein Eriksen	Citroën C3 WRC	5:26.7	+0.5	4
3	(Finland) Jari-Matti Latvala	(Finland) Miikka Anttila	Toyota Yaris WRC	5:27.0	+0.8	3
4	(Belgium) Thierry Neuville	(Belgium) Nicolas Gilsoul	Hyundai i20 Coupe WRC	5:27.4	+1.2	2
5	(Republic of Ireland) Craig Breen	(United Kingdom) Scott Martin	Citroën C3 WRC	5:27.9	+1.7	1

=== J-WRC stage winning crews ===
Junior World Rally Championship crews scored additional points. Each of the fastest stage time was awarded with one bonus point.

Pos.	Driver	Co-driver	Car	Pts.
1	(Sweden) Emil Bergkvist	(Sweden) Joakim Sjöberg	Ford Fiesta R2T	12
2	(Estonia) Ken Torn	(Estonia) Kuldar Sikk	Ford Fiesta R2T	9
3	(Finland) Henri Hokkala	(Finland) Kimmo Pahkala	Ford Fiesta R2T	2

=== Penalties ===
The following notable crews were given time penalty during the rally.

Stage	No.	Driver	Co-driver	Entrant	Car	Class	Reason	Penalty
SS3	44	(Romania) Simone Tempestini	(Romania) Sergiu Itu	(France) Citroën Total Rallye Team	Citroën C3 R5	WRC-2	1 minute late	0:10
SS6	4	(Norway) Andreas Mikkelsen	(Norway) Anders Jæger-Synnevaag	(South Korea) Hyundai Shell Mobis WRT	Hyundai i20 Coupe WRC	WRC	4 minutes late	0:40
SS9	35	(France) Pierre-Louis Loubet	(France) Vincent Landais	(Italy) BRC Racing Team	Hyundai i20 R5	WRC-2	5 minutes late	0:50
SS12	78	(India) Sanjay Takale	(United Kingdom) Darren Garrod	(United Kingdom) Darren Garrod	Hyundai i20 R5	WRC-3	4 minutes late	0:40
SS21	89	(India) Gaurav Gill	(Australia) Glenn MacNeall	(India) Team MRF Tyres	Ford Fiesta R5	—N/a	Jump start	0:10
SS22	3	(Finland) Teemu Suninen	(Finland) Mikko Markkula	(United Kingdom) M-Sport Ford WRT	Ford Fiesta WRC	WRC	2 minutes late	0:20

=== Retirements ===
The following notable crews retired from the event. Under Rally2 regulations, they were eligible to re-enter the event starting from the next leg. Crews that re-entered were given an additional time penalty.

Stage	No.	Driver	Co-driver	Entrant	Car	Class	Cause	Re-entry
SS2	36	(France) Stéphane Lefebvre	(France) Gabin Moreau	(France) Citroën Total Rallye Team	Citroën C3 R5	WRC-2	Technical	Yes
SS2	47	(Finland) Jarkko Nikara	(Japan) Sayaka Adachi	(Finland) Tommi Mäkinen Racing 2	Ford Fiesta R5	WRC-2	Off road	Yes
SS4	72	(Chile) Emilio Fernández	(Chile) Joaquin Riquelme	(Chile) Emilio Fernández	Ford Fiesta R2T	WRC-3, JWRC	Off road	No
SS6	61	(Sweden) Denis Rådström	(Sweden) Johan Johansson	(Sweden) Denis Rådström	Ford Fiesta R2T	WRC-3, JWRC	Technical	No
SS7	75	(Finland) Henri Hokkala	(Finland) Kimmo Pahkala	(Finland) Team Flying Finn	Ford Fiesta R2T	WRC-3, JWRC	Off road	No
SS8	33	(Japan) Takamoto Katsuta	(Finland) Marko Salminen	(Finland) Tommi Mäkinen Racing	Ford Fiesta R5	WRC-2	Off road	No
SS8	34	(Italy) Fabio Andolfi	(Italy) Simone Scattolin	(Italy) ACI Team Italia WRC	Škoda Fabia R5	WRC-2	Technical	Yes
SS8	37	(Japan) Hiroki Arai	(Finland) Jarmo Lehtinen	(Finland) Tommi Mäkinen Racing	Ford Fiesta R5	WRC-2	Technical	Yes
SS8	43	(Turkey) Murat Bostanci	(Turkey) Onur Vatansever	(Turkey) Castrol Ford Team Türkiye	Ford Fiesta R5	WRC-2	Off road	Yes
SS8	48	(Finland) Jouni Virtanen	(Finland) Enni Mälkönen	(United Kingdom) M-Sport Ford WRT	Ford Fiesta R5	WRC-2	Technical	Yes
SS12	12	(United Arab Emirates) Khalid Al-Qassimi	(United Kingdom) Chris Patterson	(France) Citroën Total Abu Dhabi WRT	Citroën C3 WRC	WRC	Suspension	Yes
SS12	46	(Finland) Emil Lindholm	(Finland) Mikael Korhonen	(Finland) Printsport	Škoda Fabia R5	WRC-2	Off road	No
SS13	83	(Poland) Łukasz Pieniążek	(Poland) Przemysław Mazur	(Finland) Printsport	Škoda Fabia R5	—N/a	Off road	No
SS13	64	(France) Terry Folb	(France) Kevin Bronner	(France) Terry Folb	Ford Fiesta R2T	WRC-3, JWRC	Off road	Yes
SS14	42	(Sweden) Lars Stugemo	(Sweden) Kalle Lexe	(Sweden) Lars Stugemo	Škoda Fabia R5	WRC-2	Technical	Yes
SS14	44	(Romania) Simone Tempestini	(Romania) Sergiu Itu	(France) Citroën Total Rallye Team	Citroën C3 R5	WRC-2	Off road	No
SS14	48	(Finland) Jouni Virtanen	(Finland) Enni Mälkönen	(United Kingdom) M-Sport Ford WRT	Ford Fiesta R5	WRC-2	Technical	Yes
SS15	65	(Italy) Luca Bottarelli	(Italy) Manuel Fenoli	(Italy) ACI Team Italia	Ford Fiesta R2T	WRC-3, JWRC	Off road	Yes
SS17	39	(France) Nicolas Ciamin	(France) Thibault de la Haye	(France) Nicolas Ciamin	Hyundai i20 R5	WRC-2	Off road	No
SS17	43	(Turkey) Murat Bostanci	(Turkey) Onur Vatansever	(Turkey) Castrol Ford Team Türkiye	Ford Fiesta R5	WRC-2	Mechanical	No
SS17	69	(New Zealand) David Holder	(New Zealand) Jason Farmer	(New Zealand) Holder Brothers Racing	Ford Fiesta R2T	WRC-3, JWRC	Technical	Yes
SS18	31	(Norway) Ole Christian Veiby	(Norway) Stig Rune Skjærmoen	(Czech Republic) Škoda Motorsport	Škoda Fabia R5	WRC-2	Off road	No
SS18	74	(Italy) Umberto Accornero	(Italy) Maurizio Barone	(Italy) Umberto Accornero	Ford Fiesta R2T	WRC-3, JWRC	Technical	Yes
SS20	9	(Finland) Esapekka Lappi	(Finland) Janne Ferm	(Japan) Toyota Gazoo Racing WRT	Toyota Yaris WRC	WRC	Crash	No
SS22	83	(Poland) Łukasz Pieniążek	(Poland) Przemysław Mazur	(Finland) Printsport	Škoda Fabia R5	—N/a	Off road	No

=== Championship standings after the rally ===
==== Drivers' championships ====
World Rally Championship
	Pos.	Driver	Points
	1	(Belgium) Thierry Neuville	153
	2	(France) Sébastien Ogier	132
	3	(Estonia) Ott Tänak	107
	4	(Finland) Esapekka Lappi	70
	5	(Spain) Dani Sordo	60
World Rally Championship-2
	Pos.	Driver	Points
	1	(Sweden) Pontus Tidemand	93
	2	(Czech Republic) Jan Kopecký	75
1	3	(United Kingdom) Gus Greensmith	55
1	4	(Norway) Ole Christian Veiby	45
	5	(Poland) Łukasz Pieniążek	40
World Rally Championship-3
	Pos.	Driver	Points
	1	(France) Jean-Baptiste Franceschi	79
	2	(Sweden) Denis Rådström	62
	3	(Sweden) Emil Bergkvist	61
1	4	(Finland) Taisko Lario	43
1	5	(Italy) Enrico Brazzoli	37
Junior World Rally Championship
	Pos.	Driver	Points
1	1	(Sweden) Emil Bergkvist	88
1	2	(Sweden) Denis Rådström	74
	3	(France) Jean-Baptiste Franceschi	62
7	4	(Estonia) Ken Torn	49
1	5	(Germany) Julius Tannert	31

==== Co-Drivers' championships ====
World Rally Championship
	Pos.	Co-Driver	Points
	1	(Belgium) Nicolas Gilsoul	153
	2	(France) Julien Ingrassia	132
	3	(Estonia) Martin Järveoja	107
	4	(Finland) Janne Ferm	70
	5	(Spain) Carlos del Barrio	60
World Rally Championship-2
	Pos.	Co-Driver	Points
	1	(Sweden) Jonas Andersson	93
	2	(Czech Republic) Pavel Dresler	75
1	3	(United Kingdom) Craig Parry	55
1	4	(Norway) Stig Rune Skjærmoen	45
	5	(Poland) Przemysław Mazur	40
World Rally Championship-3
	Pos.	Co-Driver	Points
	1	(France) Romain Courbon	79
	2	(Sweden) Johan Johansson	62
1	3	(Finland) Tatu Hämäläinen	43
1	4	(Italy) Luca Beltrame	37
	5	(Norway) Ola Fløene	33
Junior World Rally Championship
	Pos.	Co-Driver	Points
	1	(Sweden) Johan Johansson	74
	2	(France) Romain Courbon	62
2	3	(Sweden) Joakim Sjöberg	50
9	4	(Estonia) Kuldar Sikk	41
2	5	(Norway) Ola Fløene	38

==== Manufacturers' and teams' championships ====
World Rally Championship
	Pos.	Manufacturer	Points
	1	(South Korea) Hyundai Shell Mobis WRT	228
	2	(United Kingdom) M-Sport Ford WRT	202
	3	(Japan) Toyota Gazoo Racing WRT	201
	4	(France) Citroën Total Abu Dhabi WRT	153
World Rally Championship-2
	Pos.	Team	Points
	1	(Czech Republic) Škoda Motorsport	108
	2	(Czech Republic) Škoda Motorsport II	75
	3	(Finland) Printsport	58
	4	(Finland) Tommi Mäkinen Racing	53
1	5	(South Korea) Hyundai Motorsport	52
World Rally Championship-3
	Pos.	Team	Points
	1	(Italy) ACI Team Italia	68
1	2	(Estonia) OT Racing	62
1	3	(Germany) ADAC Sachsen	62
	4	Équipe de France FFSA Rally	55
	5	(Turkey) Castrol Ford Team Turkiye	42

== Notes ==
Previous rally: 2018 Rally Italia Sardegna	2018 FIA World Rally Championship	Next rally: 2018 Rallye Deutschland
Previous rally: 2017 Rally Finland	2018 Rally Finland	Next rally: 2019 Rally Finland
