= Sanjay Takale =

Indian rally driver

- Nationality: (India) Indian
- Born: 2 February 1968 (age 58) Manjari, Maharashtra, India

Dakar Rally (Dakar Classic) career
- Current team: aerpace Racers, Compagnie Saharienne

Championship titles
- 2013: Asia-Pacific Rally Championship – Production Cup

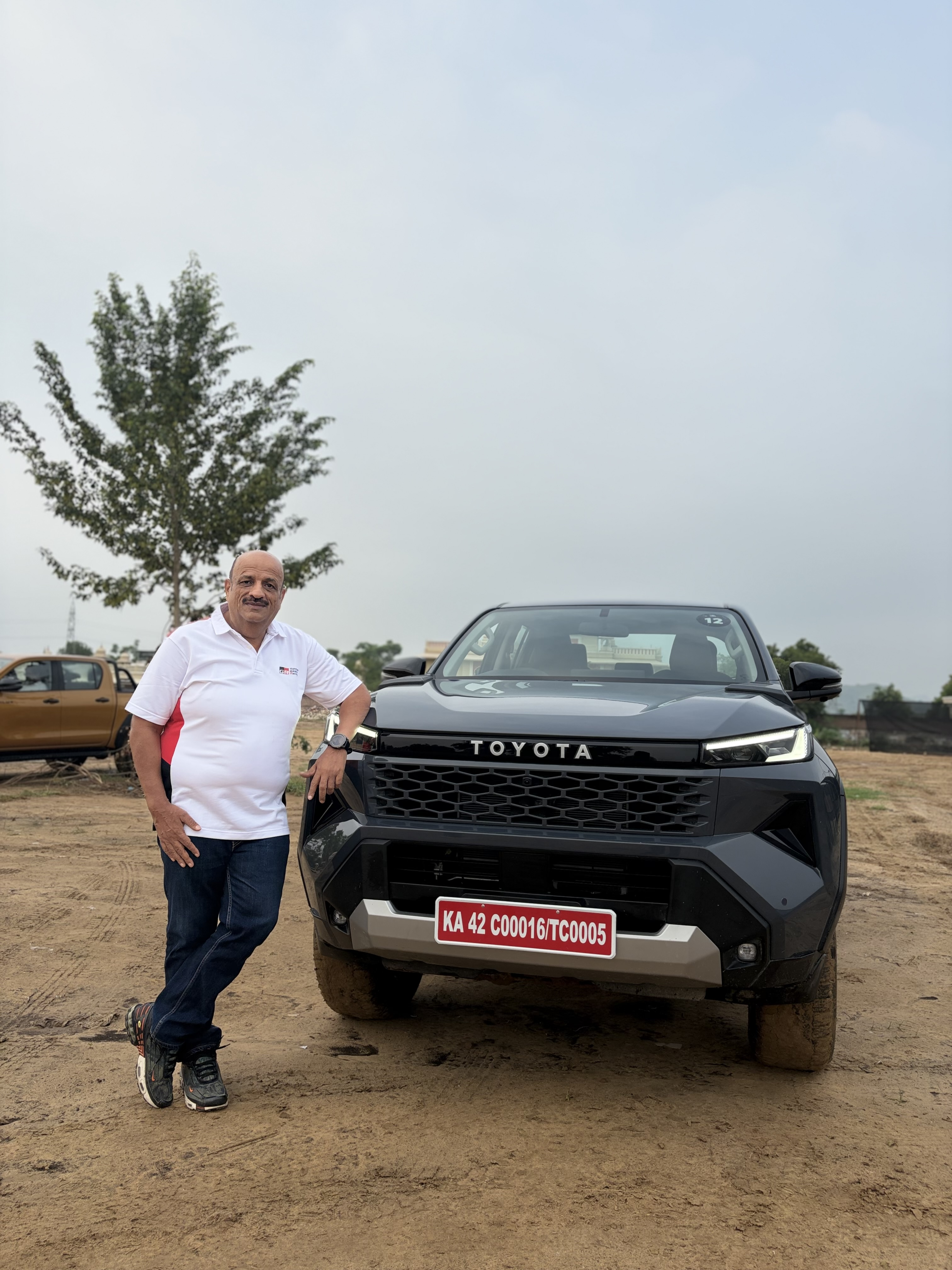

Sanjay Takale (born 2 February 1968) is an Indian rally driver from Pune, Maharashtra. In January 2025 he became the first Indian to compete in and finish the Dakar Rally in the car category, driving in the Dakar Classic class. A privateer with more than three decades in the sport, he won the Production Cup of the 2013 Asia-Pacific Rally Championship and has represented India in international rallying across Asia and Europe. He races for the Indian team aerpace Racers.

== Early life ==
Sanjay Takale was born on 2 February 1968 in Manjari, a farming village near Pune in Maharashtra. He studied at Brihan Maharashtra College of Commerce in Pune, and has said his fascination with speed began in childhood. He competed in motocross from the late 1980s, after which he stepped away from the sport for several years and travelled widely as a backpacker before returning to motorsport in cars.

== Career ==
After switching from two-wheel to four-wheel competition, Takale became the first Indian to win a class title in the Asia-Pacific Rally Championship, taking the Production Cup in the 2013 season. He competed regularly in the Malaysian Rally Championship, having rallied in the country since 2009, and finished second in his class at a round in 2017. He made his European Rally Championship debut at Rally Estonia in July 2016, and won his class at a Malaysian Rally Championship round at Johor Bahru in November 2016. In February 2018 he won the Indian Rally Championship class, with co-driver Noriko Takeshita, at the Rally of Chikmagalur, a round of the Indian National Rally Championship. He also contested selected World Rally Championship events, and represented India at the 2022 FIA Motorsport Games in France, where he finished eighth in his class and received a special finisher's award.

In August 2025, he finished second overall in Toyota Hilux AXCR 2025 at the Asia Cross Country Rally in Pattaya, recovering from a mid-event setback to take a podium and a special trophy.

Sanjay Takale joined aerpace Racers, the motorsport arm of the Indian transport company aerpace, in 2021, and is described in coverage as the company's chief advisory officer.

=== Dakar Rally ===
Takale made his Dakar Rally debut at the 2025 Dakar Rally in Saudi Arabia, competing in the Dakar Classic car class — a regularity event for older vehicles — in a Toyota Land Cruiser HZJ78 with French co-driver Maxime Raud and support from the French team Compagnie Saharienne. Ahead of the event he trained in Dubai and Morocco. He finished 18th overall and 10th in his class, becoming the first Indian to compete in and finish the Dakar Rally in a car, and recorded a top-five placing on the final stage. On his return he was given a public reception in Pune.

He returned for the 2026 Dakar Rally, again with Raud and Compagnie Saharienne and racing for aerpace Racers, in a Toyota HDJ100. He topped the rally's prologue in the Classic H3 group and won the opening stage, becoming the first Indian to win a stage in the Dakar car category, before an engine failure forced his retirement during the early stages.
