= November 5 =

November 5 this year in various calendars
- Thursday, 5 November 2026
Akan	Kwayaw
Armenian	18 Trē 1476
Aztec	Atlcahualo 14, 1 Mazātl
Babylonian	23 Tashritu, 2337 SE
Balinese pawukon	Luang, Pepet, Beteng, Sri, Umanis, Was, Wraspati of Sinta, Ludra, Jangur, Duka
Bengali	20 Kartik, BS 1433
Chinese	Yin Water Goat・Well Mansion; Fire Horse Year, Month 9, Day 27 (Shuangjiang, 2 days until Lidong)
Common Era	5 November 2026 CE
Coptic	26 Paopi, AM 1743
Egyptian	23 Phamenoth, 2775 NE
Ethiopian	26 Ṭeqemt, 2019 Amätä Məhrät
French Republican	Décade II, Quartidi de Brumaire de l'Année 235 de la République
Gregorian	5 November, AD 2026
Hebrew	25 Cheshvan, AM 5787
Hindu	Uttaraphalgunī・Indra; Solar: 19 Kārtika, 1948 SE; Lunisolar: Ekādaśī, Kṛishna pakṣa of Āśvina, 2083 VE; Rāudra・5127 KY・1,872,884
Icelandic	Fimmtudagur, 13 Gormánuður 2026
Islamic	24 Jumada al-awwal, AH 1448 (using tabular method)
ISO week date	2026-W45-4
Japanese	26 Nagatsuki, Reiwa 8 (Sōkō, 2 days until Rittō)
Julian	23 October, AD 2026 (AM 7535)
Julian day	2461350
Korean	26 Gaedal, 4359 DE
Maya	13.0.14.1.7; 0 Ceh, 1 Manik
Roman	ante diem X Kalendas Novembres, MMDCCLXXIX AUC
Solar Hijri	14 Aban, SH 1405
Tibetan	26 tha skar, me pho rta 2153 or 1772 or 1000

<<	November					>>
Su	Mo	Tu	We	Th	Fr	Sa
1	2	3	4	5	6	7
8	9	10	11	12	13	14
15	16	17	18	19	20	21
22	23	24	25	26	27	28
29	30
2026

November 5 in recent years
2026 (Thursday)
2025 (Wednesday)
2024 (Tuesday)
2023 (Sunday)
2022 (Saturday)
2021 (Friday)
2020 (Thursday)
2019 (Tuesday)
2018 (Monday)
2017 (Sunday)

November 5 is the 309th day of the year (310th in leap years) in the Gregorian calendar; 56 days remain until the end of the year.

== Events ==
=== Pre-1600 ===
- 1009 – Berber forces led by Sulayman ibn al-Hakam defeat the Umayyad caliph Muhammad II of Córdoba in the Battle of Qantish.
- 1138 – Lý Anh Tông is enthroned as emperor of Vietnam at the age of two, beginning a 37-year reign.
- 1499 – The Catholicon, written in 1464 by Jehan Lagadeuc in Tréguier, is published; this is the first Breton dictionary as well as the first French dictionary.
- 1556 – Second Battle of Panipat: Fighting begins between the forces of Hem Chandra Vikramaditya, the Hindu king at Delhi and the forces of the Muslim emperor Akbar.

=== 1601–1900 ===
- 1605 – Gunpowder Plot: Guy Fawkes is arrested in the cellars of the Houses of Parliament, where he had planted gunpowder in an attempt to blow up the building and kill King James I of England.
- 1757 – Seven Years' War: Frederick the Great defeats the allied armies of France and the Holy Roman Empire at the Battle of Rossbach.
- 1768 – The Treaty of Fort Stanwix is signed, the purpose of which is to adjust the boundary line between Indian lands and white settlements set forth in the Royal Proclamation of 1763 in the Thirteen Colonies.
- 1780 – French-American forces under Colonel LaBalme are defeated by Miami Chief Little Turtle.
- 1811 – Salvadoran priest José Matías Delgado rings the bells of La Merced church in San Salvador, calling for insurrection and launching the 1811 Independence Movement.
- 1828 – Greek War of Independence: The French Morea expedition to recapture Morea (now the Peloponnese) ends when the last Ottoman forces depart the peninsula.
- 1834 – Founding of the Free University of Brussels by Pierre-Théodore Verhaegen.
- 1862 – American Civil War: Abraham Lincoln removes George B. McClellan as commander of the Army of the Potomac.
- 1862 – American Indian Wars: In Minnesota, 303 Dakota warriors are found guilty of rape and murder of whites and are sentenced to death. Thirty-eight are ultimately hanged and the others reprieved.
- 1872 – Women's suffrage in the United States: In defiance of the law, suffragist Susan B. Anthony votes for the first time, and is later fined $100.
- 1881 – In New Zealand, 1600 armed volunteers and constabulary field forces led by Minister of Native Affairs John Bryce march on the pacifist Māori settlement at Parihaka, evicting upwards of 2,000 residents, and destroying the settlement in the context of the New Zealand land confiscations.
- 1895 – George B. Selden is granted the first U.S. patent for an automobile.
- 1898 – Negrese nationalists revolt against Spanish rule and establish the short-lived Republic of Negros.

=== 1901–present ===
- 1911 – After declaring war on the Ottoman Empire on September 29, 1911, Italy annexes Tripoli and Cyrenaica.
- 1912 – Woodrow Wilson is elected the 28th President of the United States, defeating incumbent William Howard Taft.
- 1913 – King Otto of Bavaria is deposed by his cousin, Prince Regent Ludwig, who assumes the title Ludwig III.
- 1914 – World War I: France and the British Empire declare war on the Ottoman Empire.
- 1916 – The Kingdom of Poland is proclaimed by the Act of 5th November of the emperors of Germany and Austria-Hungary.
- 1916 – The Everett massacre takes place in Everett, Washington as political differences lead to a shoot-out between the Industrial Workers of the World organizers and local police.
- 1917 – Tikhon is elected the Patriarch of Moscow and of the Russian Orthodox Church.
- 1925 – Secret agent Sidney Reilly, the first "super-spy" of the 20th century, is executed by the OGPU, the secret police of the Soviet Union.
- 1940 – World War II: The British armed merchant cruiser HMS Jervis Bay is sunk by the German pocket battleship Admiral Scheer.
- 1940 – Franklin D. Roosevelt is the first and only President of the United States to be elected to a third term.
- 1943 – World War II: Bombing of the Vatican.
- 1945 – The three-day anti-Jewish riots in Tripolitania commence.
- 1950 – Korean War: British and Australian forces from the 27th British Commonwealth Brigade successfully halted the advancing Chinese 117th Division during the Battle of Pakchon.
- 1955 – After being destroyed in World War II, the rebuilt Vienna State Opera reopens with a performance of Beethoven's Fidelio.
- 1956 – Suez Crisis: British and French paratroopers land in Egypt after a week-long bombing campaign.
- 1968 – Richard Nixon is elected as 37th President of the United States.
- 1970 – The Military Assistance Command, Vietnam reports the lowest weekly American soldier death toll in five years (24).
- 1983 – The Byford Dolphin diving bell accident kills five and leaves one severely injured.
- 1986 – USS Rentz, USS Reeves and USS Oldendorf visit Qingdao, China; the first US naval visit to China since 1949.
- 1990 – Rabbi Meir Kahane, founder of the far-right Kach movement, is shot dead after a speech at a New York City hotel.
- 1991 – Tropical Storm Thelma causes flash floods in the Philippine city of Ormoc, killing more than 4,900 people.
- 1995 – André Dallaire attempts to assassinate Prime Minister Jean Chrétien of Canada. He is thwarted when the Prime Minister's wife locks the door.
- 1996 – Pakistani President Farooq Leghari dismisses the government of Prime Minister Benazir Bhutto and dissolves the National Assembly.
- 1996 – Bill Clinton is reelected President of the United States.
- 2006 – Saddam Hussein, the former president of Iraq, and his co-defendants Barzan Ibrahim al-Tikriti and Awad Hamed al-Bandar, are sentenced to death in the al-Dujail trial for their roles in the 1982 massacre of 148 Shia Muslims.
- 2007 – China's first lunar satellite, Chang'e 1, goes into orbit around the Moon.
- 2007 – The Android mobile operating system is unveiled by Google.
- 2009 – U.S. Army Major Nidal Hasan murders 13 and wounds 32 at Fort Hood, Texas in the deadliest mass shooting at a U.S. military installation.
- 2010 – JS Air Flight 201 crashes after takeoff from Jinnah International Airport in Karachi, Pakistan, killing all 21 aboard.
- 2013 – India launches the Mars Orbiter Mission, its first interplanetary probe.
- 2015 – An iron ore tailings dam bursts in the Brazilian state of Minas Gerais, flooding a valley, causing mudslides in the nearby village of Bento Rodrigues and causing at least 17 deaths and two missing.
- 2015 – Rona Ambrose takes over after Stephen Harper as the Leader of the Conservative Party of Canada.
- 2017 – Devin Patrick Kelley kills 26 and injures 22 in a church in Sutherland Springs, Texas.
- 2021 – The Astroworld Festival crowd crush results in 10 deaths and 25 people being hospitalized
- 2024 – Donald Trump becomes the first president of the United States to be elected to a non-consecutive second term in 132 years, since Grover Cleveland won the 1892 election.

== Births ==
=== Pre-1600 ===
- 1271 – Ghazan, Mongol ruler of the Ilkhanate (died 1304)
- 1436 – Richard Grey, 3rd Earl of Tankerville, Earl of Tankerville, 1450–1460 (died 1466)
- 1494 – Hans Sachs, German poet and playwright (died 1576)
- 1549 – Philippe de Mornay, French theologian and author (died 1623)
- 1592 – Charles Chauncy, English-American pastor, theologian, and academic (died 1672)

=== 1601–1900 ===
- 1607 – Anna Maria van Schurman, Dutch painter (died 1678)
- 1613 – Isaac de Benserade, French poet and educator (died 1691)
- 1615 – Ibrahim of the Ottoman Empire (died 1648)
- 1666 – Attilio Ariosti, Italian viola player and composer (died 1729)
- 1667 – Christoph Ludwig Agricola, German painter (died 1719)
- 1688 – Louis Bertrand Castel, French mathematician and philosopher (died 1757)
- 1701 – Pietro Longhi, Venetian painter and educator (died 1785)
- 1705 – Louis-Gabriel Guillemain, French violinist and composer (died 1770)
- 1715 – John Brown, English author and playwright (died 1766)
- 1722 – William Byron, 5th Baron Byron, English lieutenant and politician (died 1798)
- 1739 – Hugh Montgomerie, 12th Earl of Eglinton, Scottish composer and politician, Lord Lieutenant of Ayrshire (died 1819)
- 1742 – Richard Cosway, English painter (died 1821)
- 1764 – Pieter Nieuwland, Dutch scientist and mathematician (known as "Dutch Isaac Newton") (died 1794)
- 1789 – William Bland, Australian surgeon and politician (died 1868)
- 1818 – Benjamin Butler, American general, lawyer, and politician, 33rd Governor of Massachusetts (died 1893)
- 1831 – Anna Leonowens, Anglo-Indian travel writer, educator, social activist, co-founder of NSCAD University (died 1915)
- 1835 – Moritz Szeps, Ukrainian-Austrian journalist and publisher (died 1902)
- 1846 – Duncan Gordon Boyes, English soldier, recipient of the Victoria Cross (died 1869)
- 1850 – Ella Wheeler Wilcox, American author and poet (died 1919)
- 1851 – Charles Dupuy, French academic and politician, 60th Prime Minister of France (died 1923)
- 1854 – Alphonse Desjardins, Canadian journalist and businessman, co-founded Desjardins Group (died 1920)
- 1854 – Paul Sabatier, French chemist and academic, Nobel Prize laureate (died 1941)
- 1855 – Eugene V. Debs, American union leader and politician (died 1926)
- 1855 – Léon Teisserenc de Bort, French meteorologist and climatologist (died 1913)
- 1857 – Ida Tarbell, American journalist, author, reformer, and educator (died 1944)
- 1870 – Chittaranjan Das, Indian lawyer and politician (died 1925)
- 1873 – Edwin Flack, Australian tennis player and runner (died 1935)
- 1879 – Otto Wahle, Austrian-American swimmer and coach (died 1963)
- 1881 – George A. Malcolm, American lawyer and jurist (died 1961)
- 1883 – P Moe Nin, Burmese author and translator (died 1940)
- 1884 – James Elroy Flecker, English author, poet, and playwright (died 1915)
- 1885 – Will Durant, American historian and philosopher (died 1981)
- 1886 – Sadae Inoue, Japanese general (died 1961)
- 1887 – Paul Wittgenstein, Austrian-American pianist and educator (died 1961)
- 1890 – Jan Zrzavý, Czech painter and illustrator (died 1977)
- 1892 – J. B. S. Haldane, English-Indian geneticist and biologist (died 1964)
- 1892 – John Alcock, captain in the Royal Navy and the Royal Air Force, copilot of the first non-stop trans-Atlantic flight (died 1919)
- 1893 – Raymond Loewy, French-American engineer and designer (died 1986)
- 1894 – Beardsley Ruml, American economist and statistician (died 1960)
- 1895 – Walter Gieseking, French-German pianist and composer (died 1956)
- 1895 – Charles MacArthur, American playwright and screenwriter (died 1956)
- 1899 – Margaret Atwood Judson, American historian and author (died 1991)
- 1900 – Natalie Schafer, American actress (died 1991)
- 1900 – Ethelwynn Trewavas, British ichthyologist, over a dozen fish species named in her honor (died 1993)

=== 1901–present ===
- 1901 – Etta Moten Barnett, American actress and singer (died 2004)
- 1901 – Martin Dies, Jr., American lawyer, judge and politician (died 1972)
- 1901 – Eddie Paynter, English cricketer (died 1979)
- 1904 – Cooney Weiland, Canadian ice hockey player and coach (died 1985)
- 1905 – Joel McCrea, American actor (died 1990)
- 1905 – Louis Rosier, French racing driver (died 1956)
- 1905 – Sajjad Zaheer, Indian author and poet (died 1973)
- 1906 – Endre Kabos, Hungarian fencer (died 1944)
- 1906 – Fred Lawrence Whipple, American astronomer and academic (died 2004)
- 1910 – John Hackett, Australian-English general and academic (died 1997)
- 1911 – Marie Osborne Yeats, American actress and costume designer (died 2010)
- 1911 – Roy Rogers, American singer, guitarist and actor (died 1998)
- 1912 – W. Allen Wallis, American economist and statistician (died 1998)
- 1913 – Guy Green, English-American director, screenwriter and cinematographer (died 2005)
- 1913 – Vivien Leigh, Indian-British actress (died 1967)
- 1913 – John McGiver, American actor (died 1975)
- 1913 – Sam Ruben, American chemist who co-discovered carbon-14 (radiocarbon dating) (died 1943)
- 1914 – Alton Tobey, American painter and illustrator (died 2005)
- 1917 – Jacqueline Auriol, French pilot (died 2000)
- 1917 – Banarsi Das Gupta, Indian activist and politician, 4th Chief Minister of Haryana (died 2007)
- 1917 – James Lawton Collins Jr., American brigadier general (died 2002)
- 1917 – Giuseppe Salvioli, Italian football player
- 1919 – Hasan Askari, Pakistani linguist, scholar and critic (died 1978)
- 1919 – Myron Floren, American accordionist and pianist (died 2005)
- 1920 – Tommy Godwin, American-English cyclist and coach (died 2012)
- 1920 – Douglass North, American economist and academic, Nobel Prize laureate (died 2015)
- 1921 – Georges Cziffra, Hungarian pianist and composer (died 1994)
- 1921 – Fawzia Fuad of Egypt (died 2013)
- 1922 – Violet Barclay, American illustrator (died 2010)
- 1922 – Yitzchok Scheiner, American-Israeli rabbi (died 2021)
- 1922 – Cecil H. Underwood, American educator and politician, 25th and 32nd Governor of West Virginia (died 2008)
- 1923 – Rudolf Augstein, German soldier and journalist, co-founder of Der Spiegel (died 2002)
- 1926 – John Berger, English author, poet, painter and critic (died 2017)
- 1927 – Hirotugu Akaike, Japanese statistician (died 2009)
- 1927 – Aloísio Magalhães, Brazilian graphic designer (died 1982)
- 1930 – Wim Bleijenberg, Dutch footballer and manager (died 2016)
- 1930 – Clifford Irving, American novelist and investigative reporter (hoax autobiography of Howard Hughes) (died 2017)
- 1930 – Hans Mommsen, German historian and academic (died 2015)
- 1931 – Leonard Herzenberg, American immunologist, geneticist and academic (died 2013)
- 1931 – Gil Hill, American actor, police officer and politician (died 2016)
- 1931 – Harold McNair, Jamaican-English saxophonist and flute player (died 1971)
- 1931 – Diane Pearson, British book editor and novelist (died 2017)
- 1931 – Ike Turner, American singer-songwriter, guitarist and producer (died 2007)
- 1932 – Algirdas Lauritėnas, Lithuanian basketball player (died 2001)
- 1933 – Herb Edelman, American actor (died 1996)
- 1934 – Jeb Stuart Magruder, American minister and civil servant (died 2014)
- 1935 – Lester Piggott, English flat racing jockey and trainer (died 2022)
- 1935 – Christopher Wood, English author and screenwriter (died 2015)
- 1936 – Michael Dertouzos, Greek-American computer scientist and academic (died 2001)
- 1936 – Uwe Seeler, German footballer (died 2022)
- 1936 – Billy Sherrill, American record producer, songwriter and arranger (died 2015)
- 1937 – Chan Sek Keong, Singaporean lawyer, judge and politician, 3rd Chief Justice of Singapore
- 1937 – Harris Yulin, American actor (died 2025)
- 1938 – Joe Dassin, American-French singer-songwriter (died 1980)
- 1938 – Jim Steranko, American author and illustrator
- 1939 – Lobsang Tenzin, Tibetan religious leader
- 1940 – Ted Kulongoski, American soldier, lawyer and politician, 36th Governor of Oregon
- 1940 – Elke Sommer, German actress (died 2026)
- 1941 – Art Garfunkel, American singer-songwriter and guitarist
- 1941 – Yoshiyuki Tomino, Japanese animator, director and screenwriter
- 1941 – Bill Schlesinger, American baseball player (died 2023)
- 1942 – Pierangelo Bertoli, Italian singer-songwriter and guitarist (died 2002)
- 1943 – Friedman Paul Erhardt, German-American chef and author (died 2007)
- 1943 – Percy Hobson, Australian high jumper (died 2022)
- 1943 – Sam Shepard, American playwright and actor (died 2017)
- 1945 – Peter Pace, American general
- 1945 – Aleka Papariga, Greek accountant and politician
- 1945 – Svetlana Tširkova-Lozovaja, Russian fencer and coach
- 1946 – Gram Parsons, American singer-songwriter and guitarist (died 1973)
- 1947 – Quint Davis, American director and producer
- 1947 – Peter Noone, English singer-songwriter and guitarist
- 1947 – Tonin Çobani, Albanian folklorist and writer.
- 1948 – Bob Barr, American lawyer and politician
- 1948 – Peter Hammill, English singer-songwriter, guitarist and producer
- 1948 – Bernard-Henri Lévy, French philosopher and author
- 1948 – William Daniel Phillips, American physicist and academic, Nobel Prize laureate
- 1949 – Armin Shimerman, American actor
- 1949 – Jimmie Spheeris, American singer-songwriter (died 1984)
- 1950 – Thorbjørn Jagland, Norwegian politician, 25th Prime Minister of Norway
- 1950 – James Kennedy, American psychologist and author
- 1952 – Oleh Blokhin, Ukrainian footballer and manager
- 1952 – Vandana Shiva, Indian philosopher and author
- 1952 – Bill Walton, American basketball player and sportscaster (died 2024)
- 1953 – Joyce Maynard, American journalist, author and academic
- 1954 – Vincenzo D'Amico, Italian footballer (died 2023)
- 1954 – Alejandro Sabella, Argentine footballer and manager (died 2020)
- 1954 – Jeffrey Sachs, American economist and academic
- 1955 – Bernard Chazelle, French computer scientist and academic
- 1955 – Kris Jenner, American talent manager and businesswoman
- 1955 – Nestor Serrano, American actor
- 1955 – Karan Thapar, Indian journalist and author
- 1956 – Rob Fisher, English keyboard player and songwriter (died 1999)
- 1956 – John Harwood, American journalist
- 1956 – Lavrentis Machairitsas, Greek singer-songwriter and guitarist (died 2019)
- 1956 – Michael Sorridimi, Australian rugby league player
- 1956 – Jeff Watson, American guitarist and songwriter
- 1957 – Mike Score, English singer-songwriter and keyboard player
- 1958 – Don Falcone, American keyboard player, songwriter and producer
- 1958 – Mo Gaffney, American actress and screenwriter
- 1958 – Robert Patrick, American actor
- 1959 – Bryan Adams, Canadian singer-songwriter, guitarist, producer and actor
- 1959 – Tomo Česen, Slovenian mountaineer
- 1960 – René Froger, Dutch singer-songwriter
- 1960 – Tilda Swinton, English actress
- 1960 – Mark West, American basketball player
- 1961 – Alan G. Poindexter, American captain, pilot and astronaut (died 2012)
- 1962 – Turid Birkeland, Norwegian businesswoman and politician, Norwegian Minister of Culture (died 2015)
- 1962 – Michael Gaston, American actor
- 1962 – Abedi Pele, Ghanaian footballer and manager
- 1962 – Marcus J. Ranum, American computer scientist and author
- 1963 – Hans Gillhaus, Dutch footballer and scout
- 1963 – Andrea McArdle, American actress and singer
- 1963 – Tatum O'Neal, American actress and author
- 1963 – Jean-Pierre Papin, French footballer and manager
- 1963 – Brian Wheat, American bass player and songwriter
- 1965 – Atul Gawande, American surgeon and journalist
- 1965 – Angelo Moore, American singer and musician
- 1966 – James Allen, English journalist and sportscaster
- 1966 – Nayim, Spanish footballer and manager
- 1966 – Urmas Kirs, Estonian footballer and manager
- 1967 – Judy Reyes, American actress and producer
- 1968 – Ricardo Fort, Argentinian actor, director and businessman (died 2013)
- 1968 – Seth Gilliam, American actor
- 1968 – Sam Rockwell, American actor
- 1969 – Pat Kilbane, American actor, comedian, director and screenwriter
- 1970 – Javy López, Puerto Rican-American baseball player
- 1971 – Sergei Berezin, Russian ice hockey player (died 2024)
- 1971 – Jonny Greenwood, English guitarist and songwriter
- 1971 – Rob Jones, Welsh-English footballer and coach
- 1971 – Corin Nemec, American actor, producer and screenwriter
- 1971 – Mårten Olander, Swedish golfer
- 1973 – Johnny Damon, American baseball player
- 1973 – Alexei Yashin, Russian ice hockey player and manager
- 1974 – Ryan Adams, American singer-songwriter and guitarist
- 1974 – Angela Gossow, German singer-songwriter
- 1974 – Dado Pršo, Croatian footballer and coach
- 1974 – Taine Randell, New Zealand rugby player
- 1974 – Jerry Stackhouse, American basketball player and sportscaster
- 1974 – Chris Sununu, American politician, Governor of New Hampshire
- 1975 – Lisa Scott-Lee, Welsh singer-songwriter
- 1976 – Sebastian Arcelus, American actor
- 1977 – Maarten Tjallingii, Dutch cyclist
- 1977 – Richard Wright, English footballer and coach
- 1978 – Xavier Tondo, Spanish cyclist (died 2011)
- 1978 – Bubba Watson, American golfer
- 1979 – Romi Dames, Japanese-American actress
- 1979 – Michalis Hatzigiannis, Cypriot singer-songwriter and producer
- 1979 – Keith McLeod, American basketball player
- 1979 – David Suazo, Honduran footballer and coach
- 1980 – Luke Hemsworth, Australian actor
- 1980 – Andrei Korobeinik, Estonian computer programmer, businessman and politician
- 1980 – Ibrahim Maalouf, French-Lebanese jazz trumpeter and composer
- 1981 – Paul Chapman, Australian footballer
- 1982 – Rob Swire, Australian singer-songwriter, guitarist and producer
- 1983 – Alexa Chung, English model and television host
- 1984 – Jon Cornish, Canadian football player
- 1984 – Tobias Enström, Swedish ice hockey player
- 1984 – Baruto Kaito, Estonian sumo wrestler
- 1984 – Eliud Kipchoge, Kenyan long-distance runner
- 1984 – John Sutton, Australian rugby league player
- 1984 – Nick Tandy, English racing driver
- 1984 – Nikolay Zherdev, Ukrainian-Russian ice hockey player
- 1985 – Kate DeAraugo, Australian singer-songwriter
- 1985 – Annet Mahendru, American actress
- 1986 – BoA, South Korean singer-songwriter, producer and actress
- 1986 – Ian Mahinmi, American basketball player
- 1986 – Kasper Schmeichel, Danish footballer
- 1986 – Nodiko Tatishvili, Georgian singer
- 1987 – Kevin Jonas, American singer-songwriter, guitarist and actor
- 1987 – Jason Kelce, American football player
- 1987 – O. J. Mayo, American basketball player
- 1988 – Yannick Borel, French fencer
- 1988 – Virat Kohli, Indian cricketer
- 1989 – D. J. Kennedy, American basketball player
- 1991 – Flume, Australian DJ and producer
- 1991 – Jon Gray, American baseball player
- 1991 – Shōdai Naoya, Japanese sumo wrestler
- 1992 – Odell Beckham Jr., American football player
- 1992 – Marco Verratti, Italian footballer
- 1993 – Dastonbek Otabolaev, Uzbekistani karateka
- 1994 – Astou Ndour-Fall, Senegalese-Spanish basketball player
- 1995 – Trey Lyles, Canadian basketball player
- 1998 – Takehiro Tomiyasu, Japanese footballer
- 2002 – Matty Beniers, American ice hockey player

== Deaths ==
=== Pre-1600 ===
- 425 – Atticus, archbishop of Constantinople
- 964 – Fan Zhi, chancellor of the Song Dynasty (born 911)
- 1011 – Mathilde, Abbess of Essen (born 949)
- 1176 – Diego Martínez de Villamayor, Castilian nobleman
- 1235 – Elisabeth of Swabia, queen consort of Castile and León (born 1205)
- 1370 – Casimir III the Great, Polish king (born 1310)
- 1450 – John IV, Count of Armagnac (born 1396)
- 1459 – John Fastolf, English soldier (born 1380)
- 1515 – Mariotto Albertinelli, Italian painter and educator (born 1474)
- 1559 – Kanō Motonobu, Japanese painter and educator (born 1476)

=== 1601–1900 ===
- 1605 – Nyaungyan Min, Burmese king (born 1555)
- 1660 – Alexandre de Rhodes, French missionary and lexicographer (born 1591)
- 1660 – Lucy Hay, Countess of Carlisle (born 1599)
- 1701 – Charles Gerard, 2nd Earl of Macclesfield, French-English colonel and politician, Lord Lieutenant of Lancashire (born 1659)
- 1714 – Bernardino Ramazzini, Italian physician and academic (born 1633)
- 1752 – Carl Andreas Duker, German scholar and jurist (born 1670)
- 1758 – Hans Egede, Norwegian-Danish bishop and missionary (born 1686)
- 1807 – Angelica Kauffman, painter (born 1741)
- 1872 – Thomas Sully, English-American painter (born 1783)
- 1876 – Theodor von Heuglin, German explorer and ornithologist (born 1824)
- 1879 – James Clerk Maxwell, Scottish physicist and mathematician (born 1831)

=== 1901–present ===
- 1923 – Jacques d'Adelswärd-Fersen, French author and poet (born 1880)
- 1928 – Vlasios Tsirogiannis, Greek general (born 1872)
- 1930 – Christiaan Eijkman, Dutch physician and pathologist, Nobel Prize laureate (born 1858)
- 1930 – Luigi Facta, Italian politician, journalist and Prime Minister of Italy (born 1861)
- 1931 – Konrad Stäheli, Swiss target shooter (born 1866)
- 1933 – Texas Guinan, American actress and businesswoman (born 1884)
- 1933 – Walther von Dyck, German mathematician and academic (born 1856)
- 1938 – Thomas Dewing, American painter and educator (born 1851)
- 1939 – Mary W. Bacheler, American physician and Baptist medical missionary (born 1860)
- 1941 – Arndt Pekurinen, Finnish activist (born 1905)
- 1942 – George M. Cohan, American actor, singer, composer, author and theatre manager/owner (born 1878)
- 1944 – Alexis Carrel, French surgeon and biologist, Nobel Prize laureate (born 1873)
- 1946 – Joseph Stella, Italian-American painter (born 1877)
- 1950 – Mary Harris Armor, American suffragist (born 1863)
- 1951 – Reggie Walker, South African runner (born 1889)
- 1955 – Maurice Utrillo, French painter (born 1883)
- 1956 – Art Tatum, American pianist and composer (born 1909)
- 1960 – Ward Bond, American actor (born 1903)
- 1960 – Donald Grey Barnhouse, American pastor and theologian (born 1895)
- 1960 – August Gailit, Estonian author and poet (born 1891)
- 1960 – Johnny Horton, American singer-songwriter and guitarist (born 1925)
- 1960 – Mack Sennett, Canadian-American actor, director, producer, and screenwriter (born 1880)
- 1963 – Luis Cernuda, Spanish poet and critic (born 1902)
- 1964 – Buddy Cole, American pianist and conductor (born 1916)
- 1964 – Lansdale Ghiselin Sasscer, American lieutenant, lawyer, and politician (born 1893)
- 1971 – Sam Jones, American baseball player (born 1925)
- 1972 – Alfred Schmidt, Estonian weightlifter (born 1898)
- 1975 – Edward Tatum, American geneticist and academic, Nobel Prize laureate (born 1909)
- 1975 – Lionel Trilling, American critic, essayist, short story writer, and educator (born 1905)
- 1977 – René Goscinny, French author and illustrator (born 1926)
- 1977 – Guy Lombardo, Canadian-American violinist and conductor (born 1902)
- 1977 – Alexey Stakhanov, Russian-Soviet miner, the Stakhanovite movement has been named after him (born 1906)
- 1979 – Al Capp, American cartoonist (born 1909)
- 1980 – Louis Alter, American musician (born 1902)
- 1981 – Rangjung Rigpe Dorje, 16th Karmapa, Tibetan spiritual leader (born 1924)
- 1985 – Arnold Chikobava, Georgian linguist and philologist (born 1898)
- 1985 – Spencer W. Kimball, American religious leader, 12th President of The Church of Jesus Christ of Latter-day Saints (born 1895)
- 1986 – Adolf Brudes, German race car driver (born 1899)
- 1986 – Claude Jutra, Canadian actor, director, and screenwriter (born 1930)
- 1986 – Bobby Nunn, American singer (born 1925)
- 1987 – Eamonn Andrews, Irish radio and television host (born 1922)
- 1989 – Vladimir Horowitz, Ukrainian-American pianist and composer (born 1903)
- 1991 – Robert Maxwell, Czech-English captain, publisher, and politician (born 1923)
- 1991 – Fred MacMurray, American actor and businessman (born 1908)
- 1992 – Adile Ayda, Russian-Turkish engineer and diplomat (born 1912)
- 1992 – Arpad Elo, American physicist and chess player (born 1903)
- 1992 – Jan Oort, Dutch astronomer and academic (born 1900)
- 1996 – Eddie Harris, American saxophonist (born 1934)
- 1997 – James Robert Baker, American author and screenwriter (born 1946)
- 1997 – Isaiah Berlin, Latvian-English historian, author, and academic (born 1909)
- 1997 – Peter Jackson, Australian rugby league player and sportscaster (born 1964)
- 1999 – James Goldstone, American director and screenwriter (born 1931)
- 1999 – Colin Rowe, English-American architect, theorist and academic (born 1920)
- 2000 – Jimmie Davis, American singer-songwriter and politician, 47th Governor of Louisiana (born 1899)
- 2000 – Bibi Titi Mohammed, Tanzanian politician (born 1926)
- 2001 – Roy Boulting, English director and producer (born 1913)
- 2001 – Milton William Cooper, American radio host, author, and activist (born 1943)
- 2003 – Bobby Hatfield, American singer-songwriter (born 1940)
- 2004 – Donald Jones, American-Dutch actor, singer, and dancer (born 1932)
- 2005 – John Fowles, English novelist (born 1926)
- 2005 – Virginia MacWatters, American soprano and actress (born 1912)
- 2005 – Link Wray, American singer-songwriter and guitarist (born 1929)
- 2006 – Bülent Ecevit, Turkish journalist and politician, 16th Prime Minister of Turkey (born 1925)
- 2007 – Nils Liedholm, Swedish footballer and manager (born 1922)
- 2009 – Félix Luna, Argentinian lawyer, historian, and academic (born 1925)
- 2010 – Jill Clayburgh, American actress and singer (born 1944)
- 2010 – Adrian Păunescu, Romanian poet, journalist, and politician (born 1943)
- 2010 – Shirley Verrett, American soprano and actress (born 1931)
- 2011 – Bhupen Hazarika, Indian singer-songwriter, director, and poet (born 1926)
- 2012 – Olympe Bradna, French-American actress and dancer (born 1920)
- 2012 – Elliott Carter, American composer and academic (born 1908)
- 2012 – Leonardo Favio, Argentinian actor, singer, director and screenwriter (born 1938)
- 2012 – Bob Kaplan, Canadian lawyer and politician, 30th Solicitor General of Canada (born 1936)
- 2012 – Louis Pienaar, South African lawyer and diplomat, Minister of Internal Affairs (born 1926)
- 2013 – Habibollah Asgaroladi, Iranian politician (born 1932)
- 2013 – Juan Carlos Calabró, Argentinian actor and screenwriter (born 1934)
- 2013 – Tony Iveson, English soldier and pilot (born 1919)
- 2013 – Charles Mosley, English genealogist and author (born 1948)
- 2013 – Charlie Trotter, American chef and author (born 1959)
- 2013 – Stuart Williams, Welsh footballer and manager (born 1930)
- 2014 – Manitas de Plata, French guitarist (born 1921)
- 2014 – Lane Evans, American lawyer and politician (born 1951)
- 2014 – Wally Grant, American ice hockey player (born 1927)
- 2014 – Abdelwahab Meddeb, Tunisian-French author, poet, and scholar (born 1946)
- 2015 – George Barris, American engineer and car designer (born 1925)
- 2015 – Nora Brockstedt, Norwegian singer (born 1923)
- 2015 – Soma Edirisinghe, Sri Lankan businesswoman and philanthropist (born 1939)
- 2015 – Czesław Kiszczak, Polish general and politician, 11th Prime Minister of the People's Republic of Poland (born 1925)
- 2015 – Hans Mommsen, German historian and academic (born 1930)
- 2020 – Geoffrey Palmer, English actor (born 1927)
- 2021 – Marília Mendonça, Brazilian singer (born 1995)
- 2022 – Aaron Carter, American singer-songwriter, rapper, dancer and actor (born 1987)
- 2023 – Pat E. Johnson, American martial artist and actor (born 1939)
- 2024 – Ben Baldanza, American economist and business executive (born 1961)
- 2024 – Elwood Edwards, American voice actor (born 1949)
- 2026 – Alan Jones, Australian race car driver and sportscaster (born 1946)
- 2026 – Paul Langmack, Australian rugby league player and coach (born 1965)

== Holidays and observances ==
- Christian feast day:
  - All Jesuit Saints and Blesseds
  - Saint Domninus of Grenoble
  - Blessed Bernhard Lichtenberg
  - Berthild of Chelles
  - Elizabeth, the mother of John the Baptist
  - Galation
  - Blessed Gomidas Keumurdjian
  - Blessed Guido Maria Conforti
  - Blessed Hryhoriy Lakota
  - November 5 (Eastern Orthodox liturgics)
- Bank Transfer Day (United States)
- Colón Day (Panama)
- Guy Fawkes Night (United Kingdom, New Zealand and Newfoundland and Labrador, Canada), and its related observances:
  - West Country Carnival (English West Country)
- Cinco de noviembre (Negros, Philippines)
- Kanakadasa Jayanthi (Karnataka, India)
