= Church of Saint Menas of Samatya =

Church of Hagios Menas of Samatya Άγιος Μηνάς
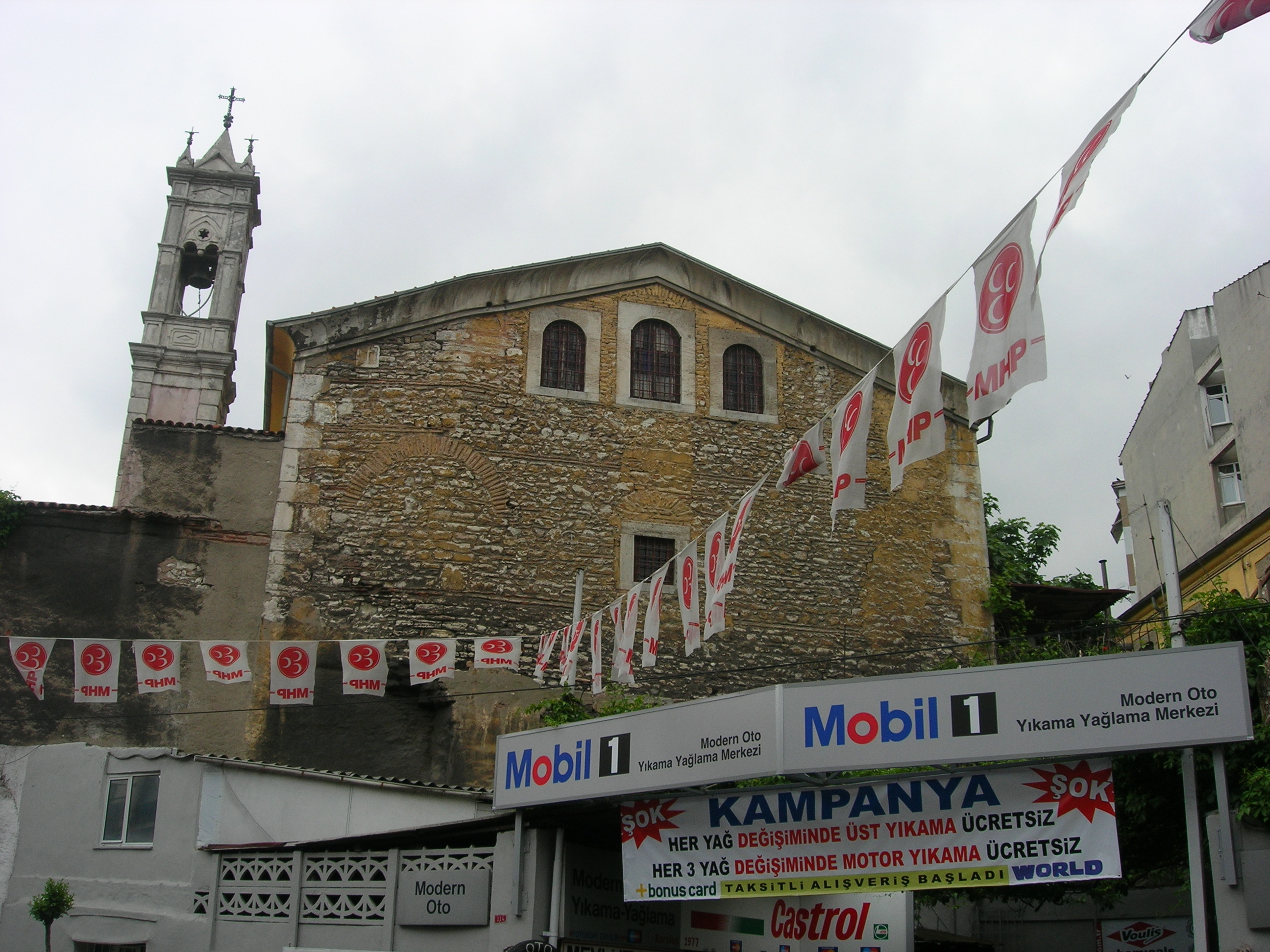
- The church viewed from east. The Martyrion can be accessed through the gas station in foreground

- Location within Istanbul Fatih
- 41.000417°N 28.931897°E
- Location: Samatya, Istanbul
- Country: Turkey
- Denomination: Greek Orthodox

History
- Founder: Helena
- Dedication: Saints Karpos and Papylos

Architecture
- Architect: Konstantis Yolasığmazis
- Groundbreaking: 1833
- Completed: 1833

Saint Menas (Greek: Ἄγιος Μηνάς, pr. Ágios Minás; Turkish: Ayios Minas Kilisesi) is a Greek Orthodox Church in Istanbul.

The edifice was built in 1833 near an early Christian Martyrion of the fourth or fifth century, possibly dedicated to the saints Carpus and Papylus (Greek: Μονὴ τῶν ἁγίων Κάρπου καὶ Παπὺλου, Monì ton Agíon Kárpou kai Papýlou ), and on the site of an ancient church dedicated to Hagios Polykarpos. The modern church has the same dedication as a nearby water source (Greek: Hagiásma, Turkish: Ayazma).

== Location ==
The church is located in Istanbul, in the district of Fatih, in the neighbourhood of Kocamustafapaşa (historically Samatya), on Bestekar Hakkı Sokak. It lies inside the walled city, in an elevated position a short distance from the shore of the Sea of Marmara. The building is protected by a high wall. The Martyrion is located under the church, on İmrahor İlyasbey Caddesi, and currently houses an iron workshop and a car wash. It is in a dilapidated state. Opposite to the Martyrion is a spring, which is also dedicated to Saint Menas.

== History ==
=== Byzantine period ===
According to the Fathers of the Church, in the fourth century Empress Helena, mother of Constantine I, authorized construction of a martyrion and a monastery dedicated to the Saints Karpos and Papylos at the foot of the steep southwestern face of the Xeropholos (part of the seventh hill of Constantinople and at that time, before the construction of the Theodosian Wall, still outside the walls of the city). Karpos and Papylos had been martyred together with the Saints Agathodorus and Agathonice in Pergamon under Decius in 251. The edifice was said to have the same plan as the one erected on the sepulcher of Christ in Jerusalem, and to be adorned with marble. Although the Helena's involvement is far from certain, and her endowment can be surely excluded, the presence of several martyria in the area is attested. Moreover, the extant round structure under the modern church stems from the fourth or fifth century and has the typical form of a martyrion. A nunnery was built here at a later date during the Byzantine Age, but at any case before the tenth century. Indeed, at that time and at least until the twelfth century there are attestations to the existence of a female monastery dedicated to the Saints Karpos and Papylos in the vicinity of the Helenianai Palace.

=== Ottoman period ===
After the Ottoman Conquest of Constantinople in 1453, the complex remained under Greek control. There are references in 1604 to the existence of a domed church dedicated to Saint Polykarpos, and of an Ayazma dedicated to Saint Menas. This church was destroyed in the great fire of Samatya of 1782, and rebuilt in 1833 by architect Konstantis Yolasığmazis, with money collected through an offertory of the local Mahalle assembly with the consent of Sultan Mahmud II (r. 1808–1839). The new church was dedicated to Saint Menas, like the near Ayazma. In 1878/9 four ancient tombs were found under the church.

=== Turkish period ===
The building was damaged during the Istanbul Pogrom of 6 September 1955, but since then it has been restored. It is still officiated and can be visited.

== Architecture ==
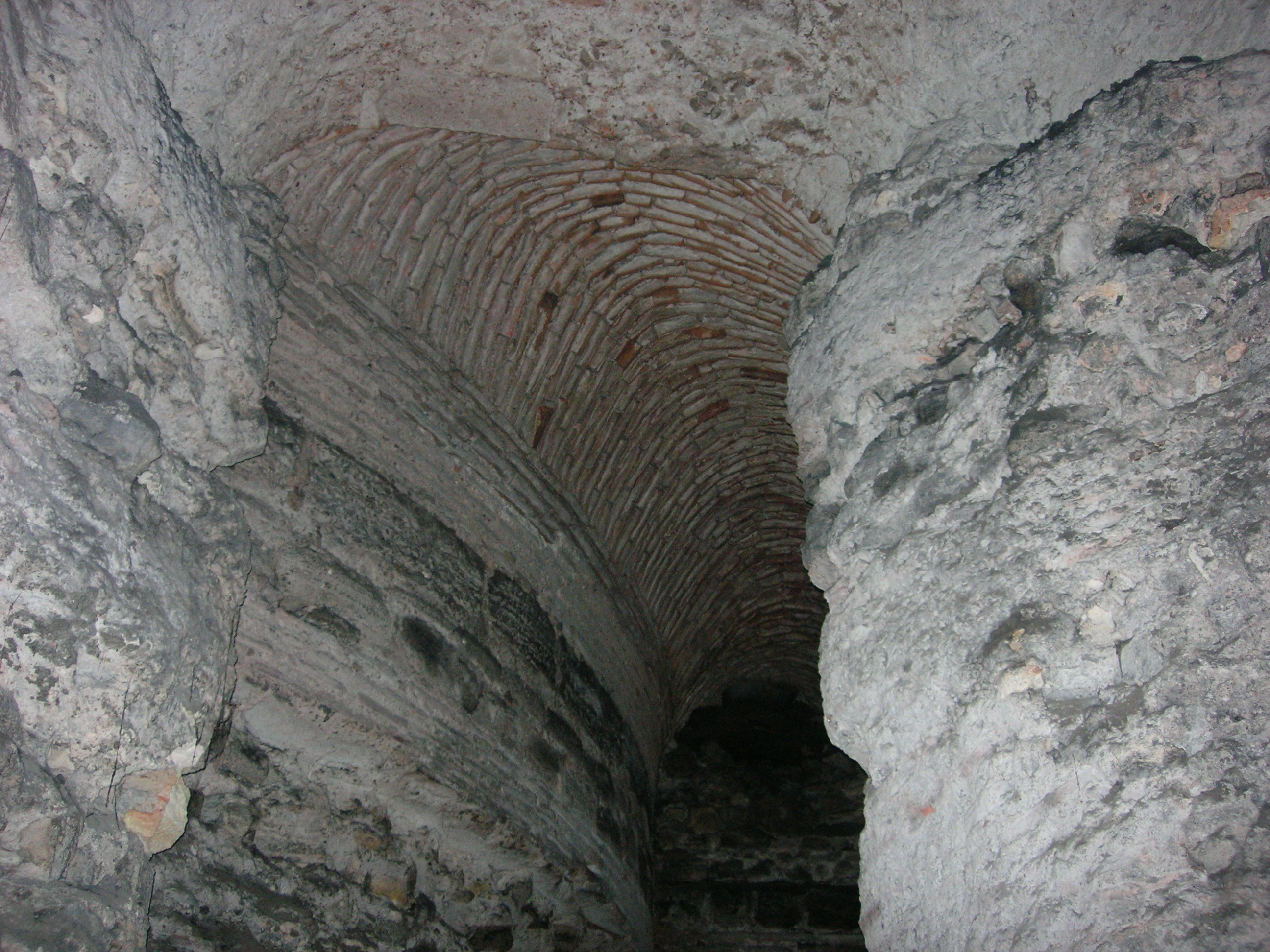
A close view of the vault of the horseshoe shaped corridor of the martyrion

The present church is a rectangular building with a basilica plan, with length of approximately 20 metres (66 ft), width of 13 metres (43 ft), and height of 9 metres (30 ft). It is oriented in east to west direction, and has a side entrance and a bell tower. The interior is divided into three naves. The pictures on the upper section of its iconostasis contain images with episodes of the life of Jesus Christ; those on the lower section, several Saints, Jesus Christ, and the Virgin Mary. On the faces of the ambon, Christ with the Evangelists are painted. The Naos is adorned with images of Christ Pantocrator. Nothing remains of the ancient Byzantine church.

The Martyrion, which lies under the church and behind a gas station, currently houses two shops, an iron workshop and a car wash shop. It can be accessed through a modern opening obtained by enlarging an ancient window. The original structure was a rotunda with an inner circle of columns supporting a dome. The central chamber is a room covered by a lowered dome constructed of brickwork with a height of 5.70 metres (19 ft) and a diameter of 12 metres (39 ft). This room is partially encompassed by a deambulatorium 2.5 metres (8 ft 2 in) wide and 7.5 metres (25 ft) high, which has a horseshoe shape. The room gives access towards the east to a rectangular bema. This has at its right the remains of a spiral stairs, possibly used in the past to reach the upper church, and at its left a cell with an apse. The Hagiasma still exists and lies opposite to the Martyrion.

== Sources ==
- Janin, Raymond (1953). La Géographie ecclésiastique de l'Empire byzantin. 1. Part: Le Siège de Constantinople et le Patriarcat Oecuménique. 3rd Vol. : Les Églises et les Monastères (in French). Paris: Institut Français d'Etudes Byzantines.
- Eyice, Semavi (1955). Istanbul. Petite Guide a travers les Monuments Byzantins et Turcs (in French). Istanbul: Istanbul Matbaası.
- Gülersoy, Çelik (1976). A guide to Istanbul. Istanbul: Istanbul Kitaplığı. OCLC 3849706.
- Müller-Wiener, Wolfgang (1977). Bildlexikon Zur Topographie Istanbuls: Byzantion, Konstantinupolis, Istanbul Bis Zum Beginn D. 17 Jh (in German). Tübingen: Wasmuth. ISBN 978-3-8030-1022-3.
