= History of the Office of the Inspector General of the United States Army =

History of the internal investigative branch of the U.S. Army

Inspector General of the United States Army
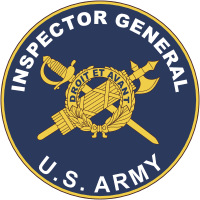
- Seal of the inspector general

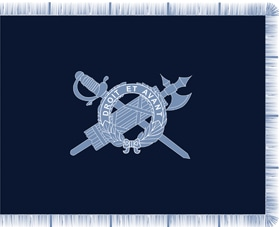
- Flag of the inspector general
- Incumbent; LTG Gregory J. Brady since March 17, 2025
- Department of the Army
- Type: Inspector general
- Abbreviation: IG
- Member of: Office of the Inspector General, U.S. Department of Defense
- Reports to: Secretary of the Army; Chief of Staff of the Army
- Seat: The Pentagon, Arlington, Virginia
- Appointer: The president; with Senate advice and consent
- Term length: 4 years
- Constituting instrument: 10 U.S.C. § 7020
- Precursor: Inspector-General of the Cavalry of the United States of America
- Inaugural holder: Thomas Conway
- Formation: December 13, 1777
- Deputy: Brig. Gen. Urbi Lewis
- Website: https://ig.army.mil

The Office of the Inspector General of the United States Army (OTIG) (Note: Before 1924: Office of the Inspector General (OIG); after 1924, Office of the Inspector General (OTIG).) is the agency tasked with investigating the United States Army. Its stated mission is to "provide impartial, objective and unbiased advice and oversight to the army through relevant, timely and thorough inspection, assistance, investigations, and training". The position of Inspector General (IG) has existed since 1777, when Thomas Conway was appointed, and the office has been reorganized many times, varied in size dramatically, and abolished on several occasions before being reinstated. In its early days, the inspectorate was frequently merged with, or proposed to be part of, the Adjutant General's department.

The office expanded greatly in the late 19th century after the American Civil War, undertaking increasing numbers of inspections. Upon the outbreak of the Spanish–American War, the War Department was ill-prepared, and much of the blame fell upon the inspectorate. Nevertheless, it continued to expand in the early 20th century, peaking during World War I, with the caseload of the department rising 360 percent from 1916 to 1917. The scope of the department rose further between the world wars. Work undertaken fell during the 1920s and rose again during the 1930s. During World War II, the department increased in size to the point that it had around 3,000 officers in 1945. The inspectorate decreased in size to about 2,000 officers in 1986.

== Background ==
The first modern military inspectors were French Army "inspecteurs," first appointed in 1668. Frederick the Great of Prussia had appointed inspectors by the 1770s, as had the British Army. Historian David Clary argues that "by the mid-eighteenth century, military inspection had become essential to modern armies." The French Army had a system of independent inspectors, who reported directly to the king. They had geographical assignments and during times of war ranked equal to generals, brigadiers, or colonels. There was also an inspector of construction. Fredrick the Great similarly appointed men to directly inspect his army, reporting directly to him and inspecting specific units. This system was adopted by much of Europe. In the British system of inspection, officers were detailed to inspect various parts of the Army, and there was a separate inspector general of recruits and of the cavalry. Commanding officers were also responsible for inspecting their troops. The detailing of officers meant that there was no formal bureaucracy dealing with inspection.

When the Continental Army was formed, it was largely modeled on the British Army. None of the European systems of inspecting worked well for the Continental Army. The British system was inadequate as it relied on an experienced, highly trained and well-disciplined army; the French because it interfered with the chain of command; and the Prussian as it relied on uniform units and practices. The Massachusetts Bay Colony and Colony of Virginia both had militias with muster masters and muster masters-general respectively serving as inspectors. Elements from all five systems were eventually incorporated.

The Continental Army was very disorganized from the start of the American Revolutionary War in 1775. After George Washington arrived at Boston to lead the army in a siege of the city, on July 4, 1775, it had taken him a week to produce an accurate count of the soldiers in the Army, which was 16,600, far fewer than the 24,500 he had expected. Poorly trained and organized, by 1777, the Army was, in Washington's opinion, in need of an inspector general. Members of the Continental Congress noted "the absence of a regular inspector," and on April 18, 1777, Congress requested the establishment of a position to "inspect the magazines of provisions under the care of Commissary Wharton."

== Early history (1777–1865) ==
Augustin de la Balme arrived in the United States in 1777, and on July 8, the Continental Congress resolved "that Lieutenant-Colonel Mottin de la Balme be appointed inspector-general of the cavalry of the United States of America, with the rank and pay of colonel." He resigned after Casimir Pulaski was promoted to Chief of Cavalry ahead of him, viewing Pulaski as an inferior cavalry leader. Philippe-Charles-Jean-Baptiste-Tronson Du Coudray was similarly appointed to Inspector General of Ordnance and Military Stores on August 11, 1777. At the time, the position was "mere flattery that meant nothing in military terms." Coudray drowned in the Schuylkill River on September 16.

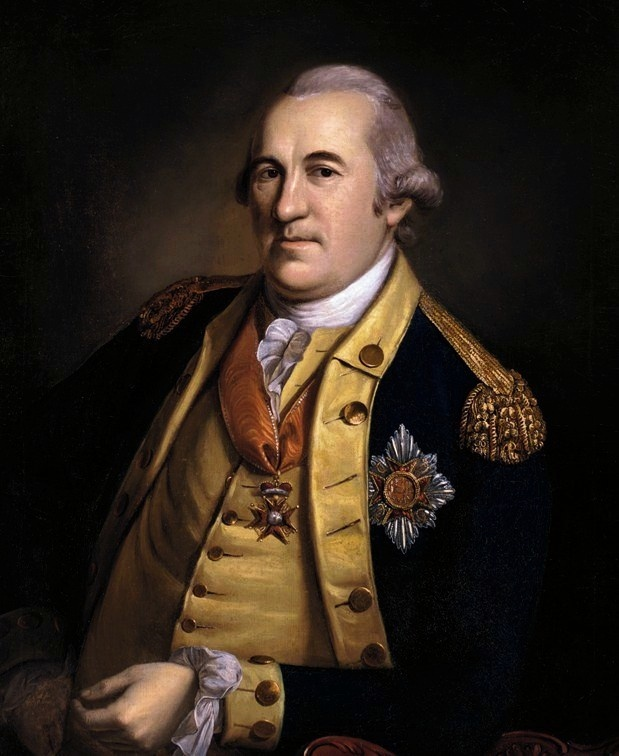
Baron von Steuben

On October 29, 1777, Washington recommended the permanent establishment of an inspector general post to the Continental Congress. On December 13, Congress established such a position, naming Thomas Conway as the first inspector general. Washington objected to the Continental Congress's choice, instead favoring the Prussian Henry Leonard d'Arendt, who had been first to propose the position. He had a personal dislike of Conway, and had come into conflict with him during what is known as the Conway Cabal, when Washington felt there was a conspiracy against him, aiming to remove him from his position as Commander-In-Chief. On April 28, 1778, Conway resigned.

Baron Friedrich Wilhelm von Steuben, a Prussian, was then selected by Washington as the next inspector general. As the first inspector general to serve a significant term, he played a large part in defining the role of the position. His book, Regulations for the Order and Discipline of the Troops of the United States, served as the official guide to military training and maneuvers in the United States Army until the War of 1812. On February 18, 1779, the Continental Congress formally created a charter for the Office of Inspector General. It gave the holder of the position the rank of major general and specified the role of the position as creating regulations for maneuvers and discipline, periodically inspecting and reporting on the condition of troops and introducing new maneuvers. Washington could appoint as many sub-inspectors as he felt necessary.

On June 22, 1779, the Continental Congress temporarily directed the Adjutant General of the United States Army to serve as assistant inspector general. By 1780, the inspector general served as de facto Chief of Staff of the United States Army. On January 12, 1780, Congress resolved that the inspector general would also manage the mustering of troops in the Continental Army. Congress further clarified the role of the office on September 25, 1780, making it responsible for regulations of the army, and again in 1782, this time shrinking the department. Steuben and his aide (later successor), William North, were heavily involved in the demobilization of the Continental Army. (Note: They supervised "the dissolution of posts, issuing orders for the transport and care of the sick and invalids, and emptying the remaining hospitals," in essence disbanding most of the Army.)

North was made inspector general in April 1784, and is known to have done little in the role. Following North's departure in late October 1787, the office was vacant until June 25, 1788, when Congress resolved "that the Office of Inspector of troops in the service of the United States immediately cease, and be discontinued, and that the secretary of war report what mode may be most eligible for having the troops inspected in the future." The United States Department of War was created by an act of Congress on August 7, 1789, and John Stagg (Note: The chief clerk of the War Department.) and Francis Mentges, the latter serving as inspector of contracts, performed most of the inspector general's duties. Until 1792 the Army functioned much like a militia.

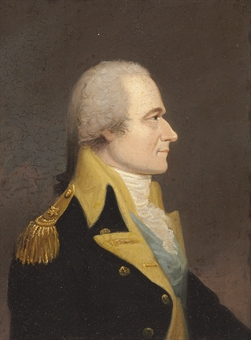
Alexander Hamilton

As a result of the escalation of the Northwest Indian War in 1790, Congress began expanding the Army. Mentges served as de facto inspector general, as did Winthrop Sargent, (Note: Mentges served as Inspector of Contracts, and Sargent (then Adjutant General) primarily inspected military outposts.) for Arthur St. Clair's army. On March 5, 1792, after St. Clair's Defeat, the army was reorganized again. When Anthony Wayne took over St. Clair's role, a few days later Henry de Butts was appointed acting inspector general. He was then followed by Edward Butler, Michael Rudolph, Jonathan Haskell and John Mills. (Note: Of Edward Butler, Michael Rudolph, Jonathan Haskell and John Mills, Butler and Rudolph were aides of Wayne. Mills was nominated by Wayne as a permanent inspector general, but then was instead appointed as acting inspector general. All four served as acting inspector general and Adjutant General.)

The Army was reorganized on November 1, 1796, with new legislation providing for an inspector general who would also perform the duties of adjutant general. Thomas Humphrey Cushing was next appointed as an acting inspector general, and would remain until 1798, when he was replaced by Alexander Hamilton, who acted as the de facto head of the Army during the Quasi-War. The position was abolished by legislation passed on May 14, 1800. Hamilton resigned on June 15, 1800, and was followed by Cushing, who served as acting inspector general.

In 1807, Cushing was replaced by Abimael Youngs Nicoll as an acting inspector general. The position was reestablished upon the outbreak of the War of 1812 with the rank of brigadier general, and Alexander Smyth was appointed. Smyth performed poorly in the role, to the point that on March 3, 1813, it was abolished by Congress, and replaced by an Inspector General's Department.

The newly formed department combined the adjutant general's and inspector general's departments. It had one adjutant and inspector general (generally the most senior inspector, who led the department), eight inspectors and adjutants and 16 assistant inspectors and 16 assistant adjutants. Zebulon Pike was appointed adjutant and inspector general in 1813, before being killed in an explosion on April 27, 1813. After Pike's death, the duties of inspector general were performed by Abimael Y. Nicoll, then the most senior inspector. Later John R. Bell and various assistant adjutants general acted as inspector general. In 1814, the position was filled by William H. Winder and Daniel Parker. After several reorganizations, by 1816, the United States Army was divided into North and South divisions, with Arthur P. Hayne inspector general in the South and John E. Wool in the North, with Parker remaining adjutant and inspector general. Hayne resigned in 1820, and was replaced by James Gadsden. In 1821, the army was reorganized, with two inspectors general, having the rank, pay and emoluments of colonels of cavalry. Parker's position was eliminated.

From 1821 to 1861, the position saw little change. During the Mexican–American War, the inspector general served as second in command of the Army. Upon the outbreak of the American Civil War, all inspectors had retired or defected to the Confederate States of America, and as a result new inspectors were appointed in 1861, largely doing what their superiors requested. There were many informally appointed inspectors and by late 1862, "nearly 1,400 other officers were on orders at one time or another to perform various types of inspection duties." In January 1863, Delos Bennett Sackett was assigned as the de facto head of the Office of the Inspector General, which, until then had not existed. In total, two major generals, seven brigadier generals, 18 colonels, 118 lieutenant colonels, and 149 majors of the regular army served official inspector duty during the Civil War.

== Reorganization (1866–1903) ==
On January 22, 1866, a War Department order re-defined the duties of inspector general to be to inspect:

the condition as to efficiency, discipline, supplies, etc., of bodies of troops, and the resources, geographical features, lines of communication and supply, the military wants, etc., of any section of the country; the military status in any field of operations; the condition and supply of military materials of various classes; the condition of the administrative or disbursing departments of the service; the efficiency and conduct of military commanders and agents; the cause of failure or delay in movements or operations; of losses by accidents, disasters, etc., and in general, all matters pertaining to the military art or having interest in a military point of view.

— United States Department of War, General Order No. 5 of 1866.

In July 1866, the number of inspectors general with the rank of colonel was fixed at four, assistant inspectors general with the rank of lieutenant colonel at three, and the number with rank of major at two. In 1866, Edmund Schriver was named inspector general of the United States Military Academy and senior inspector general. He led the movement to give the position authority equivalent to other offices of the Army. That same year, he published the first Annual Report of the Inspector General's Department. On March 3, 1869, when the army was dramatically reduced in size, the unofficial Inspector General's Department was retained, and any new appointments or promotions being prohibited. Randolph B. Marcy took over from Schriver in 1869.

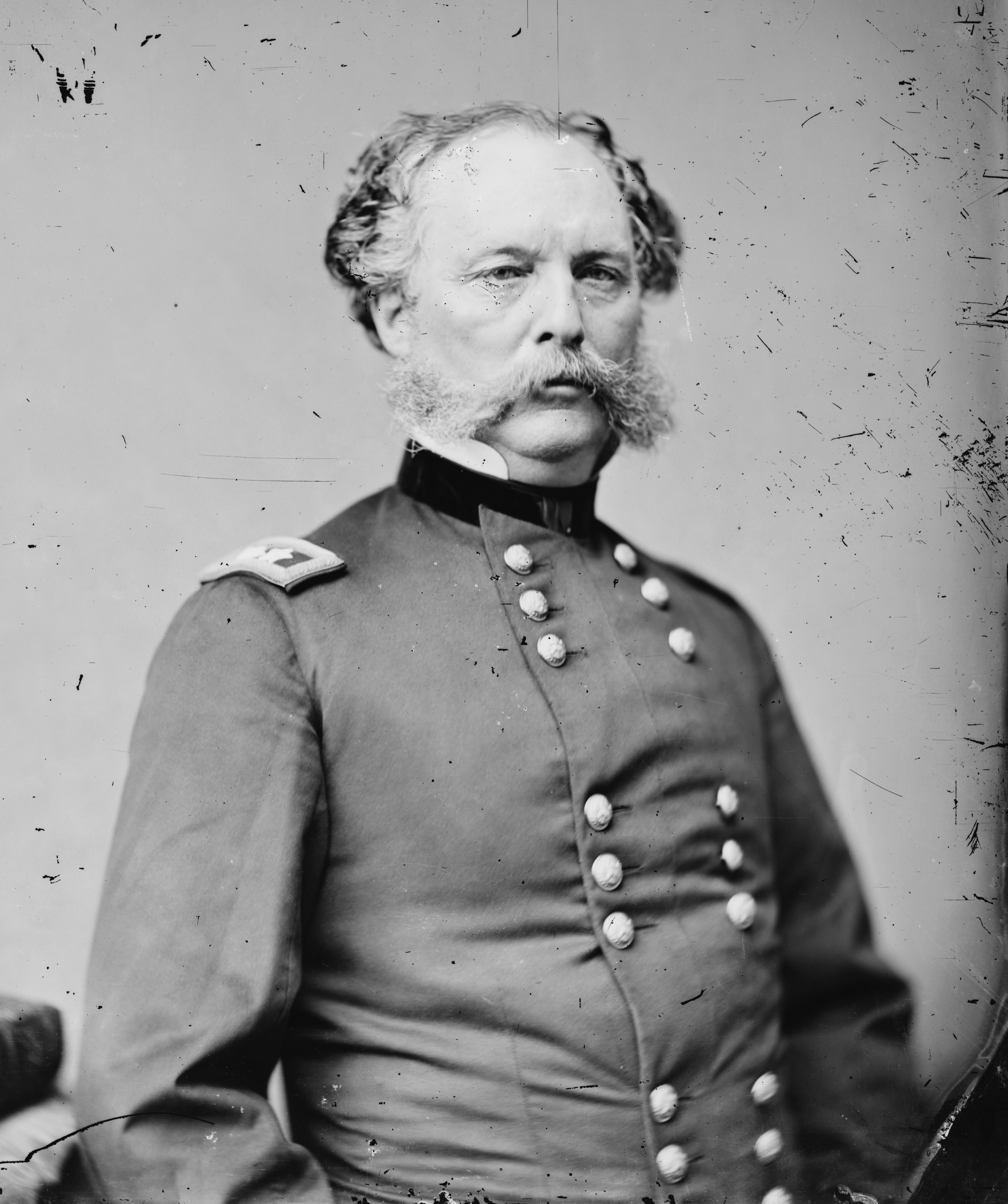
Randolph B. Marcy

By 1871, the inspectorate was being criticized by many, particularly for its "useless" reports. An anonymous letter written to the Army and Navy Journal criticized "that parasite of the army called the Inspector General's Department." On October 5, 1872, the inspectorate was formally attached to the War Department and given an independent office. In 1874, it was reduced in size by a law spearheaded by Senator John A. Logan. That same year, the Inspector General's Department was formally recognized as existing, with the adoption by the United States Congress of the Revised Statutes, which treated the department as existing, though it had never formally been established. On December 12, 1878, Congress declared that the rank of the senior inspector general of the United States Army would be brigadier general, placing it on an equal footing with other Army departments.

On February 5, 1885, the department was expanded. From then, it remained largely the same size and structure, until Joseph Cabell Breckinridge Sr. became the senior inspector general on January 30, 1889. Breckinridge, working with Secretary of War Redfield Proctor, sponsored the release of a series of general orders altering the scope of the inspectorate, culminating in the amendment of paragraph 955 Army Regulations, by General Order No. 38 of 1890, which dictated that the entire military establishment was to be inspected annually. During the late 19th century, the inspectorate engaged in many special inspections, several at the behest of Congress, and did much to safeguard public property. In 1894, the Department undertook "928 disbursement accounts involving over $68 million and inspections of 90 posts; 50 staff facilities, prisons, and ungarrisoned posts; 82 military colleges; 51 national cemeteries; 27 recruiting stations; and 28 special investigations, for a total of 1,256 inspections."

On March 30, 1895, the United States was divided by Secretary of War Daniel S. Lamont into six inspections districts, and the department was made independent, reporting directly to the secretary of war and commanding general of the United States Army, instead of department commanders. The then-Commanding General Nelson A. Miles disliked the inspectorate and in 1898 he nearly succeeded in removing the inspection districts and the independence of the department.

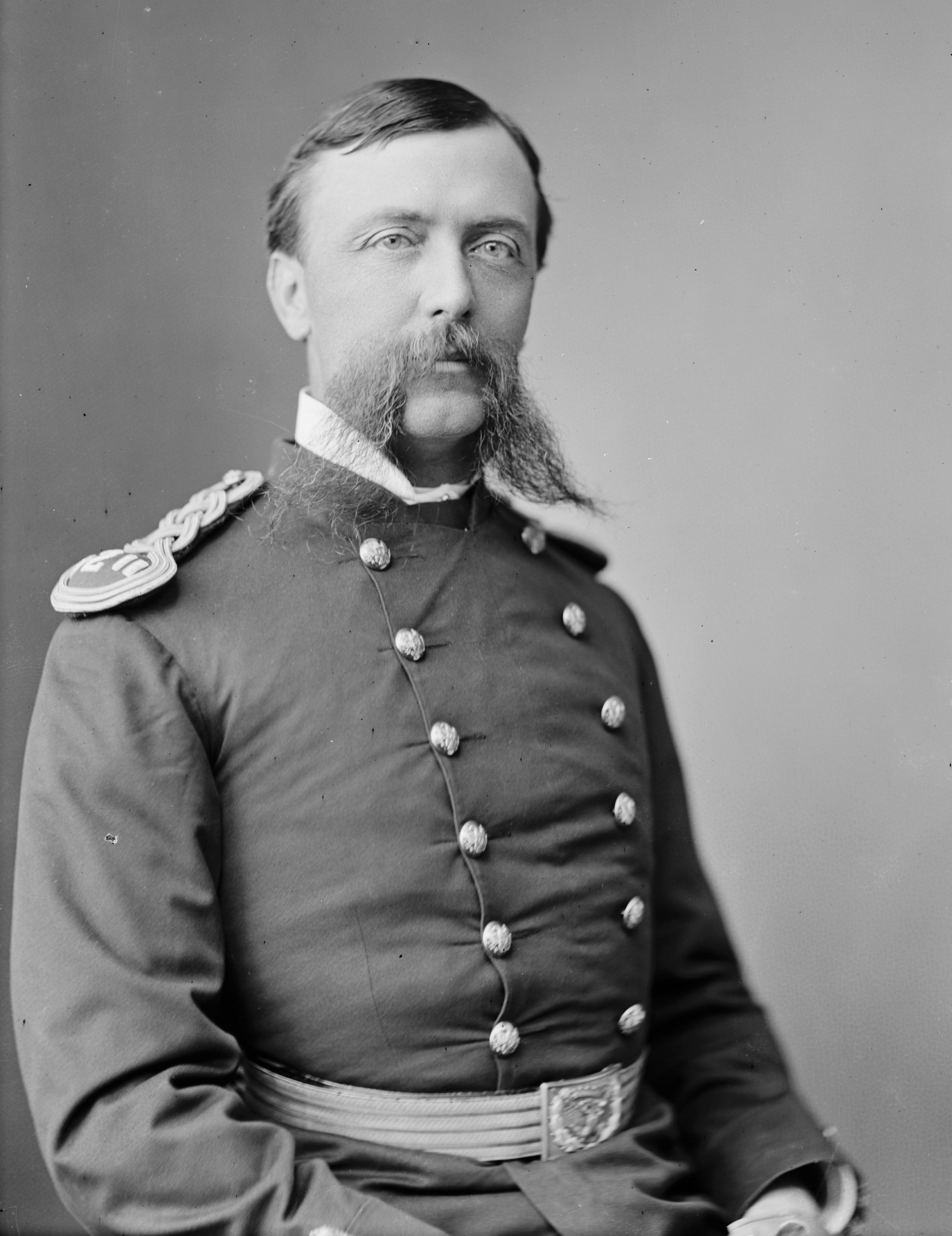
Joseph C. Breckinridge

Upon the outbreak of the Spanish–American War, the War Department was shown to be ill-prepared; and much of the blame fell on the Inspector General's Department, for not noticing problems in the Army. During the war, the department was increased in size, with 36 temporary inspectors being appointed, and three permanently appointed later. There was little oversight, as Breckinridge was fighting in the war, and the department has been described by historian David Clary as mostly existing on paper.

After the war, the inspectorate was increased in size and was revitalized. By 1901, it had one brigadier general, three colonels, four lieutenant colonels, and nine majors. In 1902, an Act to Increase the Efficiency of the Army was passed, which originally contained a clause to abolish the Inspector General Department.

== Continued growth (1903–1939) ==
The General Staff Bill, passed in 1903, had, as originally drafted, abolished the office of inspector general, but the provision was removed. In 1906, Ernest Albert Garlington replaced George H. Burton, and became senior inspector general. Under them, the office came to be seen as an extension of the Secretary of War and Chief of Staff; the inspector general collaborated closely with them and often shared their opinions. The scope of the inspectorate increased significantly, to the point that anything affecting the Army's efficiency was within its scope. The inspector general similarly became a more respected role; Thomas Henry Barry, commander of the Army of Cuban Pacification, considered his inspector to be one of his most important staff officers.

In 1911, Secretary of War Jacob M. Dickinson submitted a plan to merge the Adjutant and Inspector General Departments; another proposal was presented by the General Staff in 1914, and again in 1915 in what led to the National Defense Act of 1916. Through those years, the inspectorate under Garlington was one of the most vocal advocates of motorizing the army. With the passage of the National Defense Act, the size of the inspectorate was increased to a maximum of 33 officers, and the Army itself was dramatically increased in size. The inspectorate became responsible for oversight of the education and training of both officers and men, and its reports largely shaped changes in the education of officers.

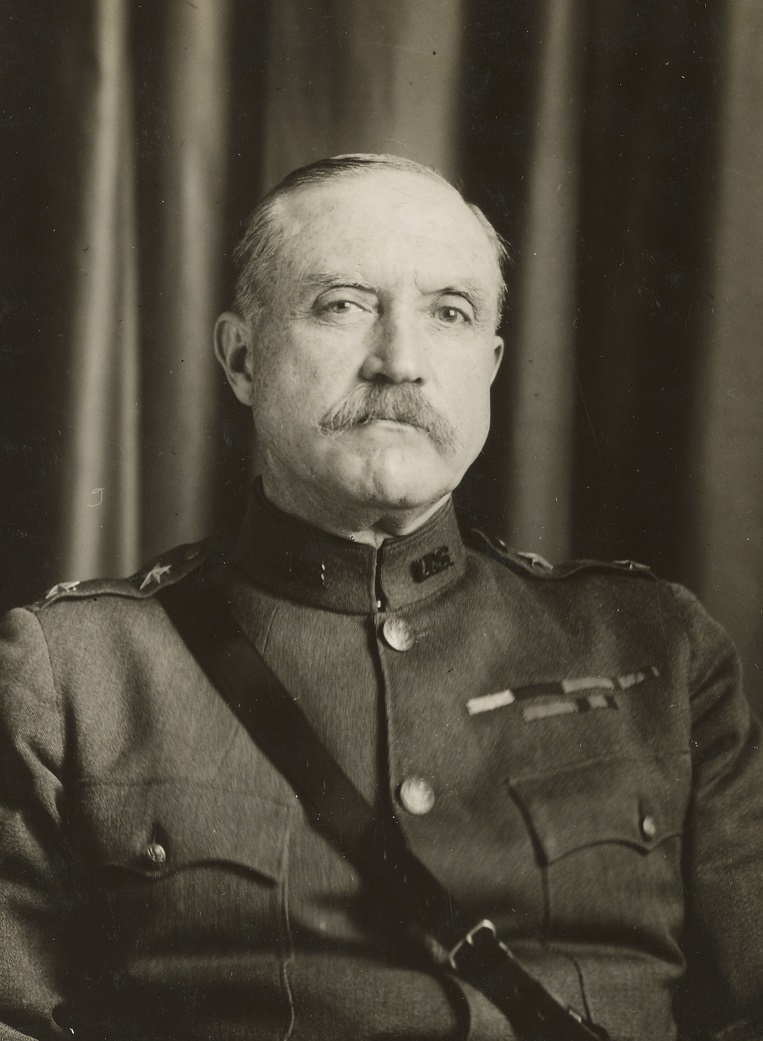
Andre W. Brewster

The Army was poorly prepared upon the entrance of the United States into World War I in 1917, and was restructured, with the Overman Act giving the President greater authority over the Army. By July 1917, the caseload of the inspectorate had increased 360 percent from the previous year and by 65 percent in three months after the declaration of war. To meet the increased caseload, the inspectorate was dramatically expanded, to the point that it struggled to find suitable inspectors, and began requesting that former inspectors come out of retirement. In September, there were 89 officers (30 regulars, 10 recalled regulars, and 49 reservists). In November, the department was again increased to 164 officers and 125 enlisted men. It rose to 216 officers on November 12, 1918. Andre W. Brewster was selected as Inspector General of the American Expeditionary Forces.

In the period after World War I, the inspectorate dealt with many problems, including complaints over misdirected mail, misconduct by soldiers and damage to civilian property. Inspectors were active in France (until 1919), Russia (until 1920), and Germany (until 1923). The inspectorate peaked at 248 officers in 1919, the same year a plan to severely limit the Department's responsibilities was proposed. By 1920, 33 officers were in the Office of the Inspector General, while 54 remained at camps or in the geographical departments. In 1915 the office had handled about 9,500 actions, while by 1921 it processed nearly 17,700.

In the National Defense Act of 1920, the inspectorate was reorganized, with an inspector general and 61 inspectors. The Secretary of War could shrink or increase the office by 15 percent without Congress passing a new law, and the department shrunk from 62 to 56 officers in June 1922. After several further rounds of downsizing, there were 40 IGs in 1923. In 1925, the inspectorate allocated the additional responsibility of inspecting ten monuments and twelve parks. To obtain better training for inspectors general, they would often receive training at civilian businesses and schools, including Sears & Roebuck. The department inspected finances and troops, with the number of inspections increasing dramatically at the beginning of the 1930s, under Hugh Aloysius Drum and his successors. By the mid-1930s the War Department inspectorate was averaging about sixty major investigations annually. The department assumed responsibility for inspecting the Civilian Conservation Corps in 1933.

== Later history (1940–2026) ==
By 1940, all subordinate commanders from division level and above were assigned an inspector general under their control to conduct inspections and investigations as needed. The Army grew exponentially during World War II, and by 1945, there were about 3,000 inspectors general serving in the Army. The rapid reduction in the size of the Army from about 9 million in 1945 to a few hundred thousand in 1946 resulted in the inspector general system receiving thousands of requests for help from soldiers being released from the Army, largely because they were not being released quickly enough.

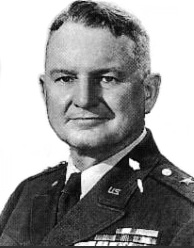
David Ayres Depue Ogden, Inspector General 1956–57

The statutory basis for the current IG system stems from the 1950 Army Reorganization Act, which replaced the Inspector General Department with the Office of the Inspector General (OTIG). The Inspector General was responsible to the Chief of Staff, and responsive to the Secretary of the Army. The reorganization made the Inspector General responsible for investigating the discipline, efficiency, and economy of the Army, with a particular focus on training and combat readiness. In 1952, the OTIG initiated an orientation course for officers selected to be inspectors general. Before this there was no provision for formal instruction, although the old Inspector General Department had maintained and distributed instructional material to each inspector general, including guides, handbooks and other procedural training.

The qualifications for inspectors general were first formally codified in 1957. In May 1956, the Secretary of the Army directed the Department of the Army to assume responsibility for technical proficiency inspections of the Army's nuclear surety program worldwide, which ensure the safety of the Army's nuclear weapons. General Order No. 40, dated August 24, 1956, placed these inspections under the jurisdiction of the Inspector General. The March 1960 revision of Army Regulation 20-1 created a policy for inspector general technical proficiency inspections. The work of the inspector general was shared with allies, when the OTIG gave a course of instruction to groups composed entirely of foreign officers. In 1961, instruction was delivered to Republic of Korea Army officers in Seoul, Korea, and to Nationalist Chinese Army officers in Taipei, Formosa. The 1978 IG Act created 12 statutory cabinet-level inspectors general across a range of government departments outside the Department of Defense, which led to the creation of the Office of Inspector General, U.S. Department of Defense.

In 1986 the Goldwater-Nichols Reorganization Act reversed a portion of the 1950 Army Reorganization Act, making the Inspector General responsible to the Secretary of the Army and responsive to the Chief of Staff. The inspector general system also became automated. The first effort was called the Inspector General Management Information Resource System (IGMIRS). IGMIRS was later replaced by the Inspector General Worldwide Network (IGNET). The inspector general system has since "inspected or reviewed soldier readiness programs, risk management programs, anti-terrorism and force protection, extremist group activities, homosexual conduct policy implementation, and the No Gun Ri massacre during the Korean War". In 1993, the inspectorate had about 2,000 inspectors, consisting of officers, NCOs and Department of the Army civilians. Since the creation of the IGNET, the inspectorate has remained relatively unchanged, with a revision to Army Regulation 20-1 in 2010 adjusting the OTIG's scope. LTG Gregory J. Brady was sworn in as the Inspector General on March 17, 2025.
