= Sevan Bıçakçı =

Turkish jeweler (born 1972)

Sevan Bıçakçı Սեւան Պըչաքչը
- Born: 1972 (age 53–54); Istanbul, Turkey
- Occupation: Jeweller

Sevan Bıçakçı (Armenian: Սեւան Պըչաքչը; born 1972) is a Turkish famed jeweller of Armenian descent. He is one of the few renowned jewelers in Turkey and is known around the world. He is considered a "star jeweler" in Turkey.

== Life and career ==
Of Armenian descent, Sevan Bıçakçı was born in 1972 in the Samatya district of Istanbul, Turkey. He is known as the 'King of Rings'. He started his experience with Hovsep Catak during his teenage years. His jewelry designs are that of Byzantine and Ottoman styles. Some of Sevan Bıçakçı's famous clientele include Celine Dion and Liv Tyler.

== Awards ==
Sevan Bıçakçı has received many distinguished awards such as:

- Town and Country Couture Award
- Turkish Gold Design Award
- He was nominated for the Jameel Prize Award
