= La Balme's Defeat =

1780 battle between Canadien settlers and British-allied Miami warriors

- Part of the American Revolutionary War
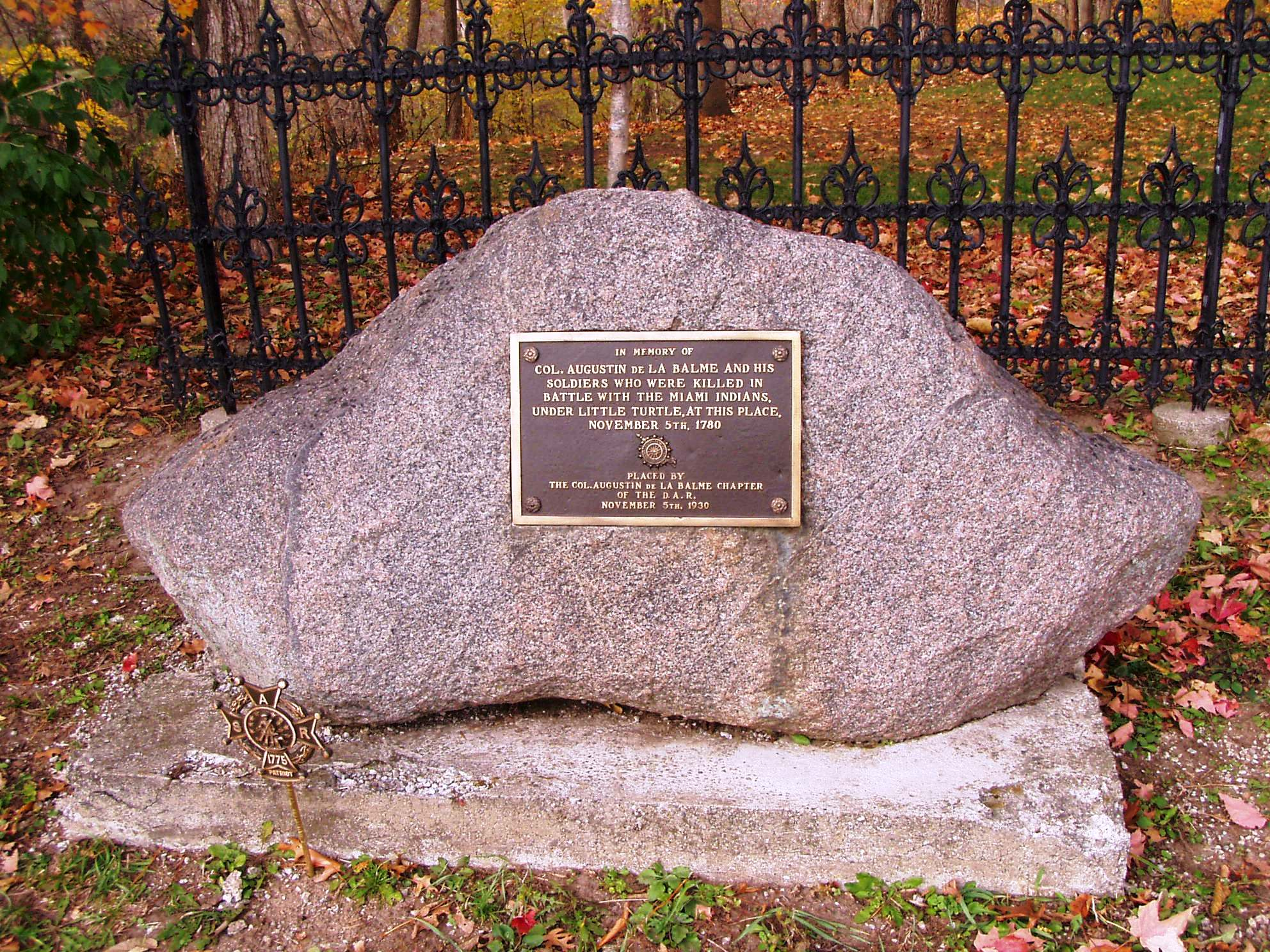
- Historical marker commemorating the battle
Date	5 November 1780
Location	Ohio Country
Result	Miami victory

Belligerents
Miami	France

Commanders and leaders
Little Turtle	La Balme †

Strength
Unknown	104 irregulars

Casualties and losses
5 killed	30–40 killed

LaBalme's Defeat was a military engagement which occurred on November 6, 1780, between a force of Canadien settlers under the command of French officer Augustin de La Balme and British-allied Miami warriors led by chief Little Turtle during the American Revolutionary War. La Balme had led the hastily recruited force of irregulars to attack British-held Fort Detroit, but was ambushed by a group of Miami warriors after sacking their town of Kekionga on the way. The victory led Little Turtle to become well known on the American frontier, a reputation which would develop during the Northwest Indian War.

== Background ==
Former cavalry officer Augustin de La Balme arrived in the United States with a group of French volunteers that included the Marquis de Lafayette, and was appointed as the Colonial Army's Inspector General of Cavalry in 1777. This position was later given to Kazimierz Pułaski. LaBalme resigned in October 1777. However, in 1780, he traveled down the Ohio River to Kaskaskia. The success of General Clark's capture of Fort Sackville at Vincennes inspired La Balme to attempt a similar feat against the British at Fort Detroit. La Balme arrived in Kaskaskia as a French officer and was "greeted as Masiah" by the local Canadien residents, who had been living under British rule for over a decade. He represented himself as a representative of Louis XVI of France and gathered a list of grievances from residents living under the rule of the Virginians, which was to be delivered to the French Ambassador at Fort Pitt. La Balme openly disdained Clark, whom he considered an uneducated woodsman.

He coordinated a diversionary attack against Fort St. Joseph, then began his journey to Detroit, recruiting militia from among the Canadian citizens of Kaskaskia, Cahokia, and Vincennes. At Vincennes, he started up the Wabash River with the expectation of adding to his force from the Canadian villages of Ouiatenon (present day West Lafayette, Indiana) and Kekionga (present day Fort Wayne). La Balme apparently expected Canadian residents at Fort Detroit to join him once they arrived. La Balme kept the French ambassador, Anne-César de La Luzerne, updated on his movements, and the expedition marched under a French flag. La Balme's mounted force moved so quickly that it had little opposition until reaching Kekionga, where La Balme had planned to arrest Charles Beaubien, the British agent. Beaubien and many of the Miami were not there, however, so the force raised the French flag and raided British stores for two weeks while awaiting reinforcements that never arrived. Upon learning of the return of a Miami hunting party to Kekionga, Le Balme departed to raid another trading post on the Eel River. La Balme left twenty French soldiers to guard the captured stores at Kekionga and marched his force out over the Eel River trail (the same trail Colonel John Hardin would follow ten years later).

== Battle ==
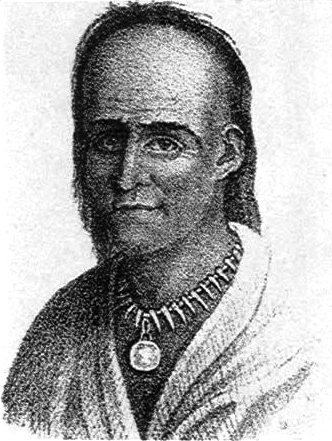
Miami war chief Little Turtle led the defense against La Balme's invasion.

The Miami Indians, learning of the invasion, destroyed the small group of 20 men left at Kekionga, who were all killed. Little Turtle, who lived in a village along the Eel River, received permission from the Kekionga Miami to lead an attack. He gathered available warriors and attacked La Balme's camp at dawn on 5 November, before he reached the Eel River trading post and just 3 miles from Little Turtle's village. The first casualty of the attack was a French soldier named Antoine Rembault who was serving as a "look out" for La Balme's forces. As Rembault alerted the rest of the French soldiers about the presence of the Miami, Little Turtle struck Rembault in the head with a tomahawk hard enough to have the tomahawk "buried in (Rembault's) brain." La Balme and his men fortified themselves on the banks of the river but were only able to fire one volley before being overwhelmed. The ensuing battle was entirely one sided, only a few survivors managed to escape. Multiple French soldiers were heard begging to surrender while they were scalped alive by Little Turtle's men.

La Balme also died in the battle, which became known as "La Balme's Defeat". A group of French officers were deliberately taken alive by Little Turtle. Three of the captured officers were burnt alive at the stake, another one of them had his hands and feet cut off before being executed by having his face struck with a tomahawk. The remaining four were then set free as a warning to the rest of the French. When French forces allied to the Americans attempted to scout out the location a few days later, they saw that the path was blocked by the heads of several French soldiers impaled on pikes. After seeing this, they turned back. These events occurred near modern-day Columbia City in Whitley County, Indiana. In another subsequent operation a small detachment under earlier orders from La Balme was defeated by Miami forces on December 5, 1780, at Petit Fort, Indiana.

== Aftermath ==
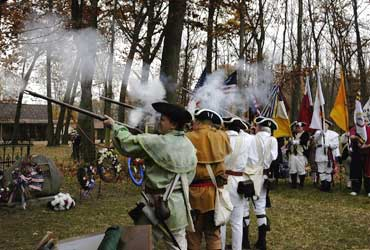
Historical enactors commemorating the 225th anniversary of the battle on 5 November 2005

For his leadership in this battle, Little Turtle gained a reputation that initiated a successful career as a military commander in the Northwest Indian War. 11 years later, almost to the day, he led an attack that remains one of the worst defeats in U.S. Army history. Although La Balme's expedition resulted in failure, it did cause the British considerable concern. Major de Peyster subsequently deployed a detachment of Butler's Rangers to protect Kekionga. The Miami, some of whom had favored the United States or wished to remain neutral, were enraged at the attack on Kekionga and united in an alliance with the British. Fort Detroit would remain under British control until the Jay Treaty was ratified in 1796 (Detroit was again surrendered to the British in the War of 1812, but was returned at the conclusion of the war).

In a log entry dated 13 November, Major Arent DePeyster, in command of the British garrison at Detroit, recorded that "A detachment of Canadians from the Illinois and Post Vincennes arrived Kekionga about 10 days ago, and entered the village, took the horses, destroyed the horned cattle and plundered a store I allowed to be kept there for the convenience of the Indians, soon after assembled and attacked the Canadians, led by a French colonel... The Miami resisting the fire of the enemy, had five of their party killed, being, however, more resolute than savages are in general, they beat off the enemy, killed 30 and took La Balme prisoner with his papers … I expect the Colonel in every hour … The Spanish Governor at St. Louis, Francisco Cruzat, wrote that "I am very sorry for what has happened to Monsieur La Balme ... [he] having, perhaps, attempted with imprudence an undertaking which needed more time, more strength and better circumstances..."

== Memorials ==
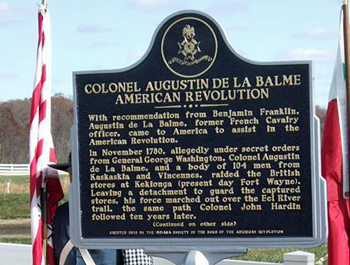
Historical marker commemorating the battle

- In northeast Indiana, near the Allen – Whitley County line, along the Eel River, A brass and stone marker placed by the Daughters of the American Revolution in 1930, reads: "In memory of Col. Augustin de La Balme and his soldiers who were killed in battle with the Miami Indians under Little Turtle at this place, November 5, 1780."
- 5 November 2005, the Indiana Society Sons of the American Revolution erected a bronze marker and commemorated the event's 225th anniversary. The ceremony involved descendants of Revolutionary War soldiers and Miami Indians.
- 6 November 2010, the Indiana Society Sons of the American Revolution erected a bronze historical marker commemorating the event.
