= Samatya =

Quarter of Istanbul

Coordinates: 41°00′N 28°56′E

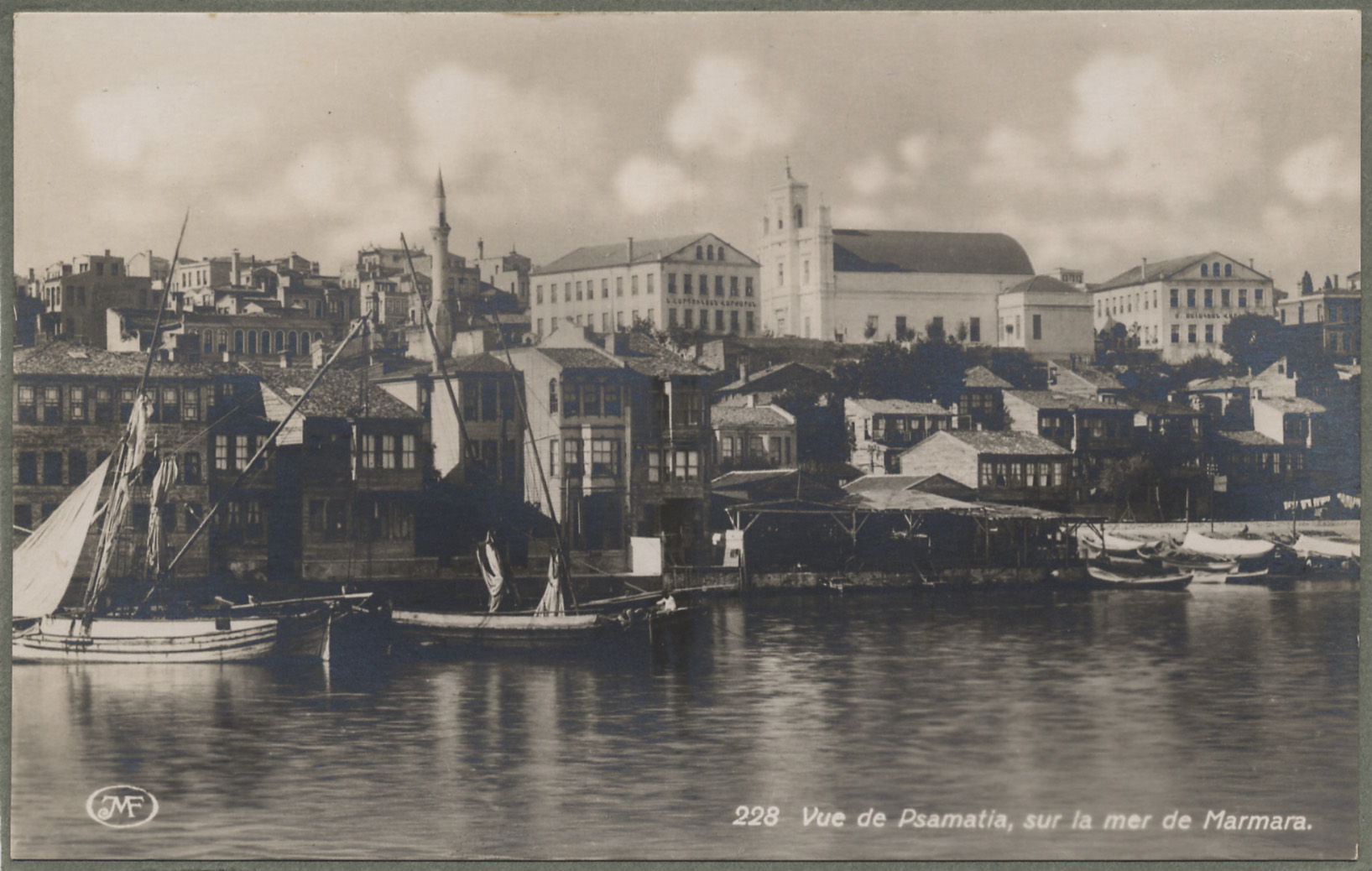
Samatya quarter of Istanbul during the Ottoman period

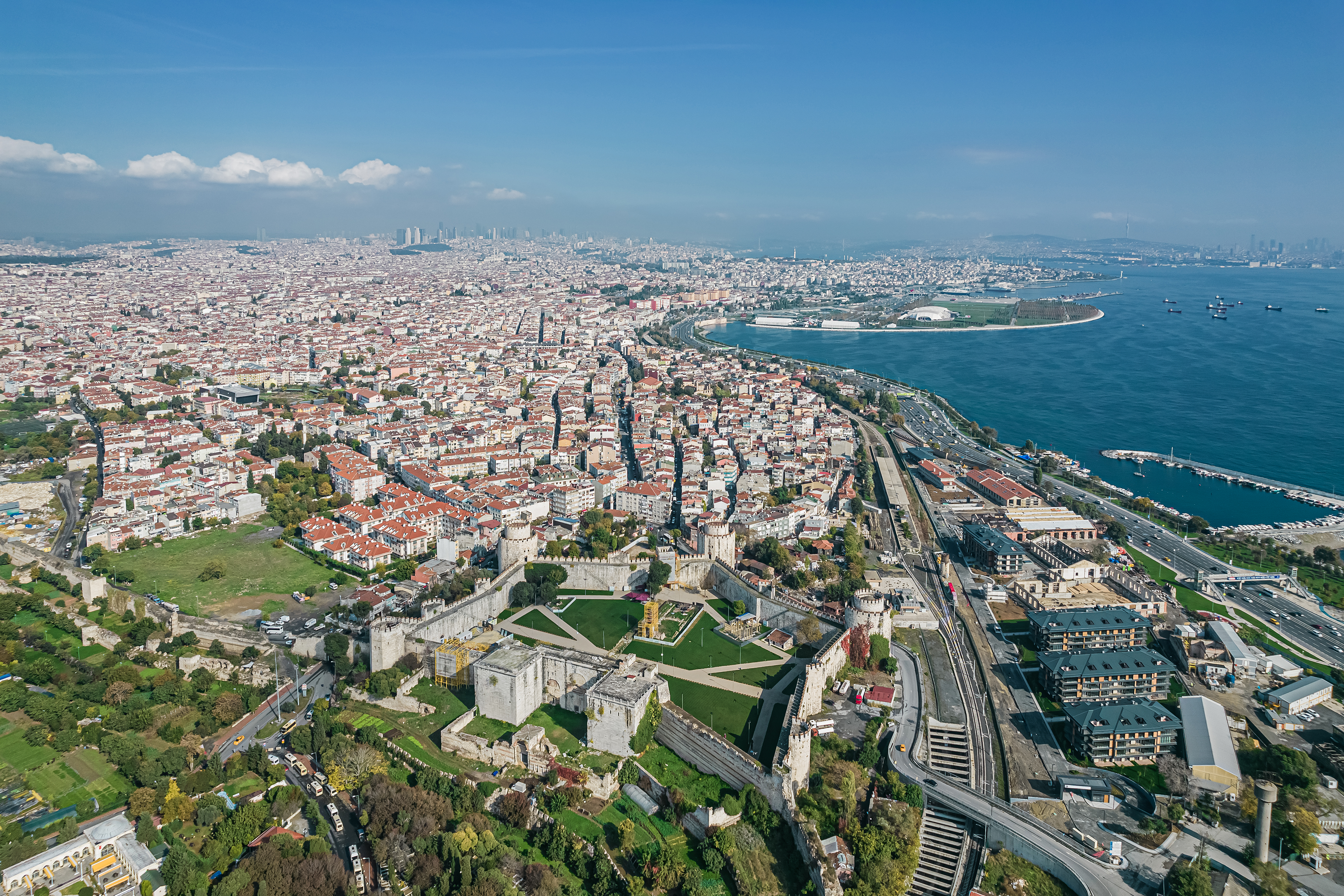
Aerial view of the Yedikule Fortress, Yedikule neighbourhood and the Samatya quarter in the background

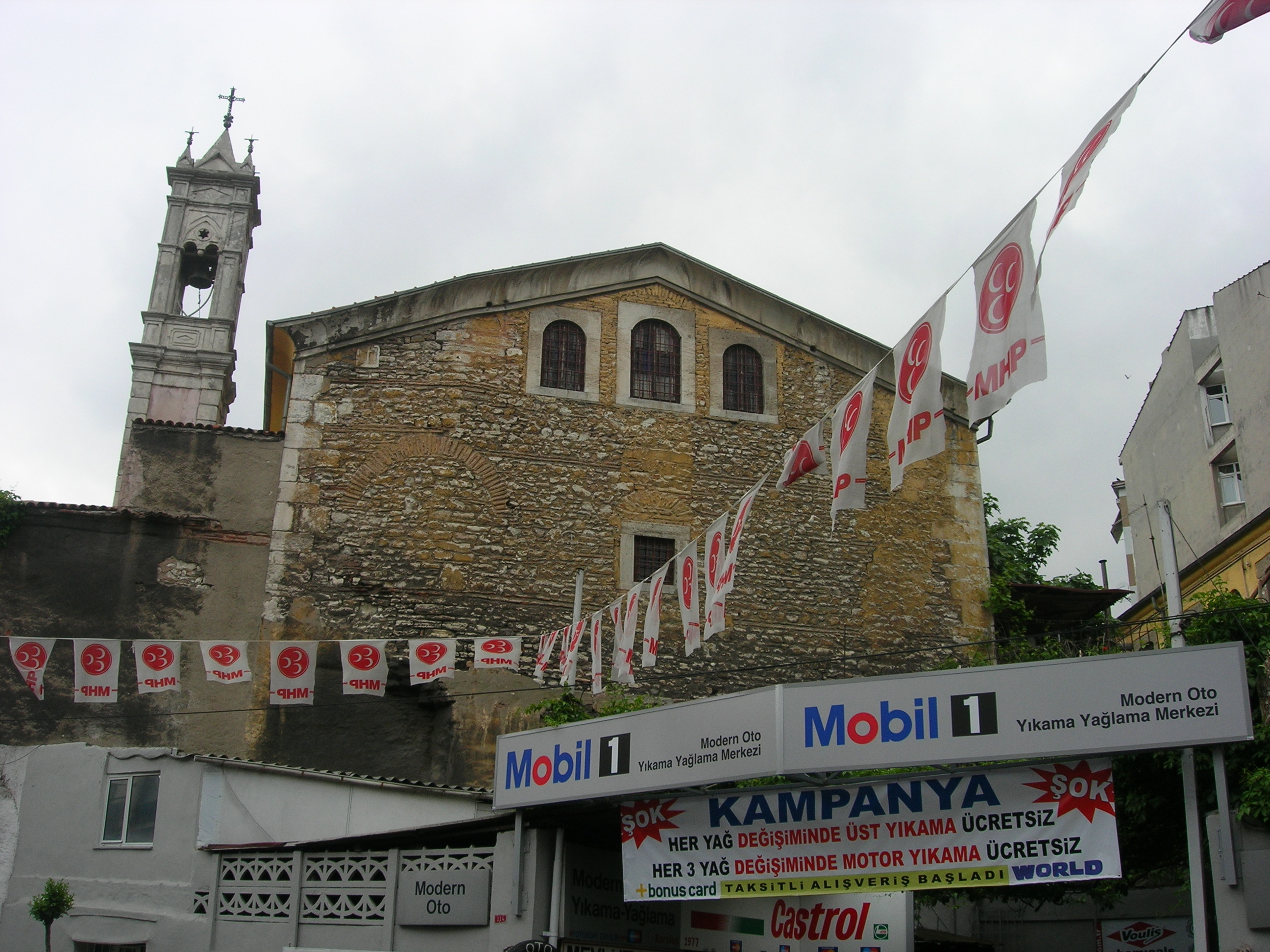
Church of Saint Menas of Samatya

Samatya (Greek: Ψαμάθεια, romanized: Psamatheia; Armenian: Սամաթիա) is a quarter of the Fatih district of Istanbul. It is located along the Marmara Sea, and borders to the west on the neighborhood of Yedikule (the "Castle of the Seven Towers").

== Etymology ==
The name originates from the Greek word psamathion (Ψαμάθιον), meaning "sandy", because of the great quantity of sand found in the quarter.

== History ==
About 383 AD, the first monastic institution was established in Constantinople, at Psamatheia, at that time still outside the walled city.

Up to recent times, Samatya was mostly inhabited by Armenians, who were settled here in 1458 by Sultan Mehmet II, and who own there the church of Surp Kevork, also called Sulu Manastiri (Water's monastery) – previously an Eastern Orthodox church which dates back to before the Ottoman conquest, and by Greeks, who have the churches of Hristos Analipsis and Haghios Menas.

The quarter was destroyed in 1782 by one of the largest fires of Istanbul ever recorded.

The area was affected by the British bombing of İstanbul during the WWI.

== Samatya today ==
In Samatya there is also an important public hospital, the Istanbul Educational and Research Hospital İstanbul Eğitim ve Araştırma Hastanesi.

Samatya has a station (named "Kocamustafapaşa") on the T6 line Sirkeci-Kazlıçeşme.

== Notable personalities ==
- Hrachia Acharian - Armenian linguist
- Simon Agopyan - Armenian painter
- Mihran Apikyan - Armenian writer and linguist
- Sevan Bıçakçı - Turkish jeweller
- Gomidas Keumurdjian - priest and martyr of the Armenian Catholic Church
- Levon Larents - Armenian writer
- Avedis Zildjian III - Armenian American cymbal maker

== Sources ==
- Janin, Raymond (1964). Constantinople Byzantine (in French) (2 ed.). Paris: Institut Français d'Etudes Byzantines.
- Müller-Wiener, Wolfgang (1977). Bildlexikon zur Topographie Istanbuls: Byzantion, Konstantinupolis, Istanbul bis zum Beginn d. 17 Jh (in German). Tübingen: Wasmuth. ISBN 978-3-8030-1022-3.
