= Office of the Inspector General of the United States Army =

Internal investigative branch of the U.S. Army

Inspector General of the United States Army
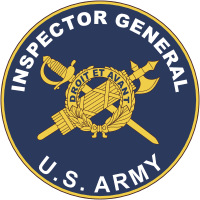
- Seal of the inspector general

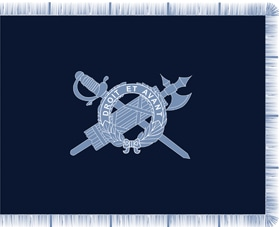
- Flag of the inspector general

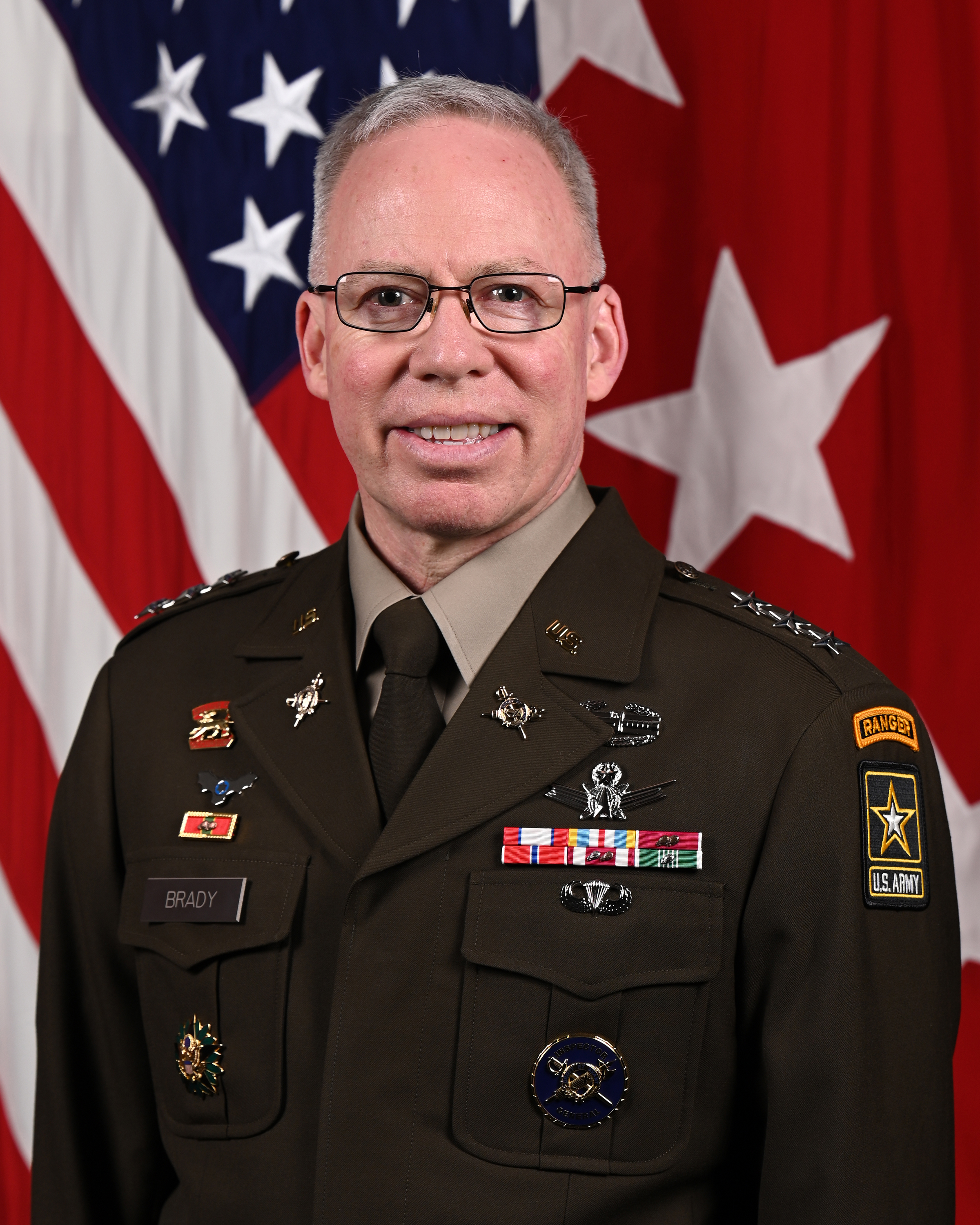
- Incumbent; LTG Gregory J. Brady since March 17, 2025
- Department of the Army
- Type: Inspector general
- Abbreviation: IG
- Member of: Office of the Inspector General, U.S. Department of Defense
- Reports to: Secretary of the Army; Chief of Staff of the Army
- Seat: The Pentagon, Arlington, Virginia
- Appointer: The president with Senate advice and consent
- Term length: 4 years
- Constituting instrument: 10 U.S.C. § 7020
- Precursor: Inspector-General of the Cavalry of the United States of America
- Inaugural holder: Thomas Conway
- Formation: December 13, 1777
- Deputy: BG Urbi Lewis
- Website: https://ig.army.mil

The Office of the Inspector General (OTIG) serves to "provide impartial, objective and unbiased advice and oversight to the Army through relevant, timely, and thorough inspection, assistance, investigations, and training." The position has existed since 1777, when Thomas Conway was appointed the first inspector. The department was reorganized many times, and almost abolished on several occasions. In its early days, the department was frequently merged with, or proposed to be part of the Adjutant General. It expanded greatly after the American Civil War, to the point that in 1993 it had around 2,000 officers, non-commissioned officers, and civilian employees.

The current Inspector General is Lieutenant General Gregory J. Brady, who was sworn in on March 17, 2025.

== History ==
The Office of the Inspector General of the United States Army dates back to the appointments of Colonel Augustin de la Balme (IG July 8, 1777 – October 11, 1777) as "Inspector-General of the Cavalry of the United States of America," and Major General Philippe Charles Tronson du Coudray (IG August 11, 1777 – September 15, 1777) as "Inspector General of Ordnance and Military Stores" during the American Revolutionary War. The first formal inspector general was Major General Thomas Conway (IG December 13, 1777 – April 28, 1778). Conway was replaced by Major General Friedrich Wilhelm von Steuben (IG May 5, 1778 – April 15, 1784), who was selected by Washington and approved by Congress. The position continued, variously merged with, commanding, or being commanded by the Adjutant General of the United States Army until after the American Civil War, when it was formally established as an office equivalent to other Army departments.

After the war, the inspectorate continued to largely grow. It was criticized for performance during the Spanish–American War, but the role of the office soon increased significantly, to the point that anything affecting the Army's efficiency was within its scope. Upon the outbreak of World War I, the department grew dramatically, shrinking during the Great Depression, and further growing throughout World War II and the Cold War.

== Current role ==
The Inspector General of the United States Army reports to the United States Secretary of the Army (SA) and the Chief of Staff of the United States Army (CSA). Modern Inspectors General of the Army are confirmed by Congress at the rank of lieutenant general (O-9 paygrade). The Army IG System investigates and reports on the "discipline, efficiency, economy, morale, training, and readiness" of the Army, and acts as the "eyes, ears, voice, and conscience" of the SA and CSA. The inspectorate is authorized to undertake any investigations where they see necessary, and cooperates with the Office of the Inspector General, U.S. Department of Defense. The inspector is also responsible for inspecting various issues in the Army including alleged problems within the Army.

The OTIG is composed of officers, non-commissioned officers, and DA civilians. It has a field operating agency, the United States Army Inspector General Agency, comprising inspections, investigations, assistance, operations, and support divisions. All inspectors general are required complete a three-week basic IG course at The Inspector general School (TIGS), Fort Belvoir, Virginia. Graduates take the Inspector General oath before commencing IG duty at their assigned post:

I _________, having been assigned as an Inspector General, do solemnly swear (or affirm) that I accept the special obligations and responsibilities of the position freely, that I will uphold the standards for Inspectors General prescribed by regulations and that I will, without prejudice or partiality, discharge the duties of the office which I am about to enter. So help me God.

The Inspections Division has inspected or reviewed soldier training and readiness programs, risk management programs, anti-terrorism and force protection, extremist group activities, homosexual conduct policy implementation, and the No Gun Ri massacre during the Korean War.
