= William W. Wheeler =

U.S. Navy admiral

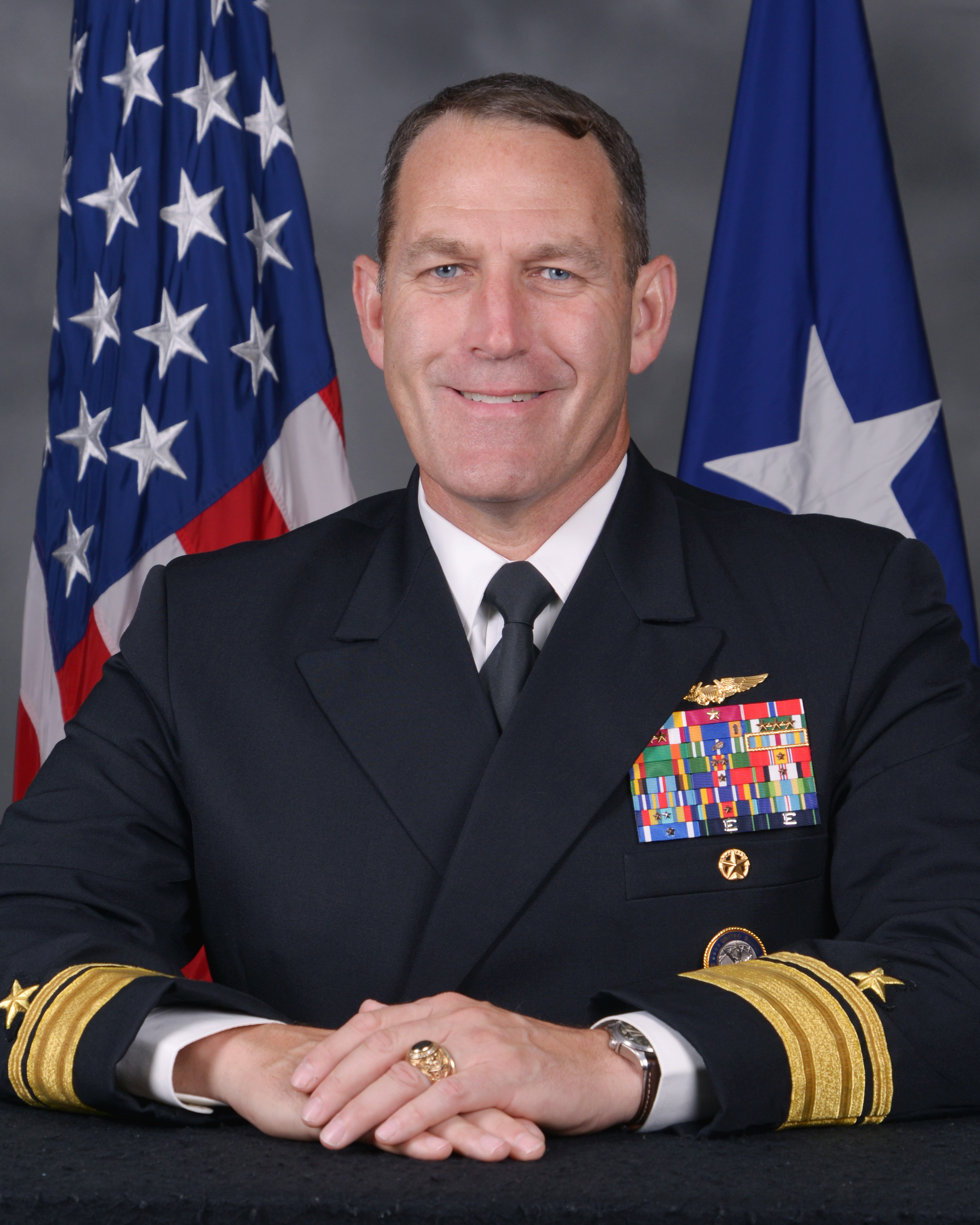
- Born: 1966 (age 59–60); Cross City, Florida, U.S.
- Military career
- Allegiance: United States
- Branch: United States Navy
- Service years: 1988–2022
- Rank: Rear Admiral
- Nickname: Trey
- Commands: Patrol and Reconnaissance Group; Patrol and Reconnaissance Wing 11

William Wandle Wheeler III (born 1966) is a retired United States Navy rear admiral who served as the Chief of Staff of the United States Strategic Command from July 31, 2020 to July 2022. Previously, he was the director of plans and policy of the United States Cyber Command from July 2018 to July 2020. Wheeler graduated from the United States Naval Academy in 1988 with a B.S. degree in oceanography. He later earned a master's degree in national security strategy from the National War College.

Military offices
Preceded by Kyle J. Cozad	Commander of the Patrol and Reconnaissance Group; 2017–2018	Succeeded by Pete Garvin
Preceded by Ross A. Myers	Director of Plans and Policy of the United States Cyber Command; 2018–2020	Succeeded by Daniel W. Dwyer
Preceded by Randy S. Taylor	Chief of Staff of the United States Strategic Command; 2020–2022	Succeeded by Gregory J. Brady
