= Mihran Apikyan =

Writer and educator (1855–1938)

Mihran Apikyan (Armenian: Միհրան Աբիկյան; 1855, Istanbul - 1938, Istanbul) was an Armenian and Turkish writer and educator of Armenian descent. He is also known as Mihran Efendi (before the Surname Law) and with his pen name Mihrî. He is accredited for introduction European-styled educational methods in the Ottoman Turkish educational system.

== Life and teaching career ==
Of Armenian descent, Mihran Efendi was born in Samatya. In 1873 he was appointed as a teacher of Ottoman Turkish to the Sahakyan Mektebi, a local Armenian school at his neighborhood. He also worked at the Getronagan Armenian High School.

Apikyan has written around 30 books to about Turkish language and culture. He also wrote an Armenian-Turkish dictionary.

== Works ==
- Zübde-i nahv-i osmanî (Nişan Berberyan Matbaası, 1890)
- Tatbikat-ı Münşeat (Istanbul, Rumi 1306)
- İksir-i Elifbayı Osmaniyye (a book on the Ottoman Alphabet), Latürkî printhouse, Istanbul, 1297 (1881)
