= Gregory Brady =

U.S. Army general officer

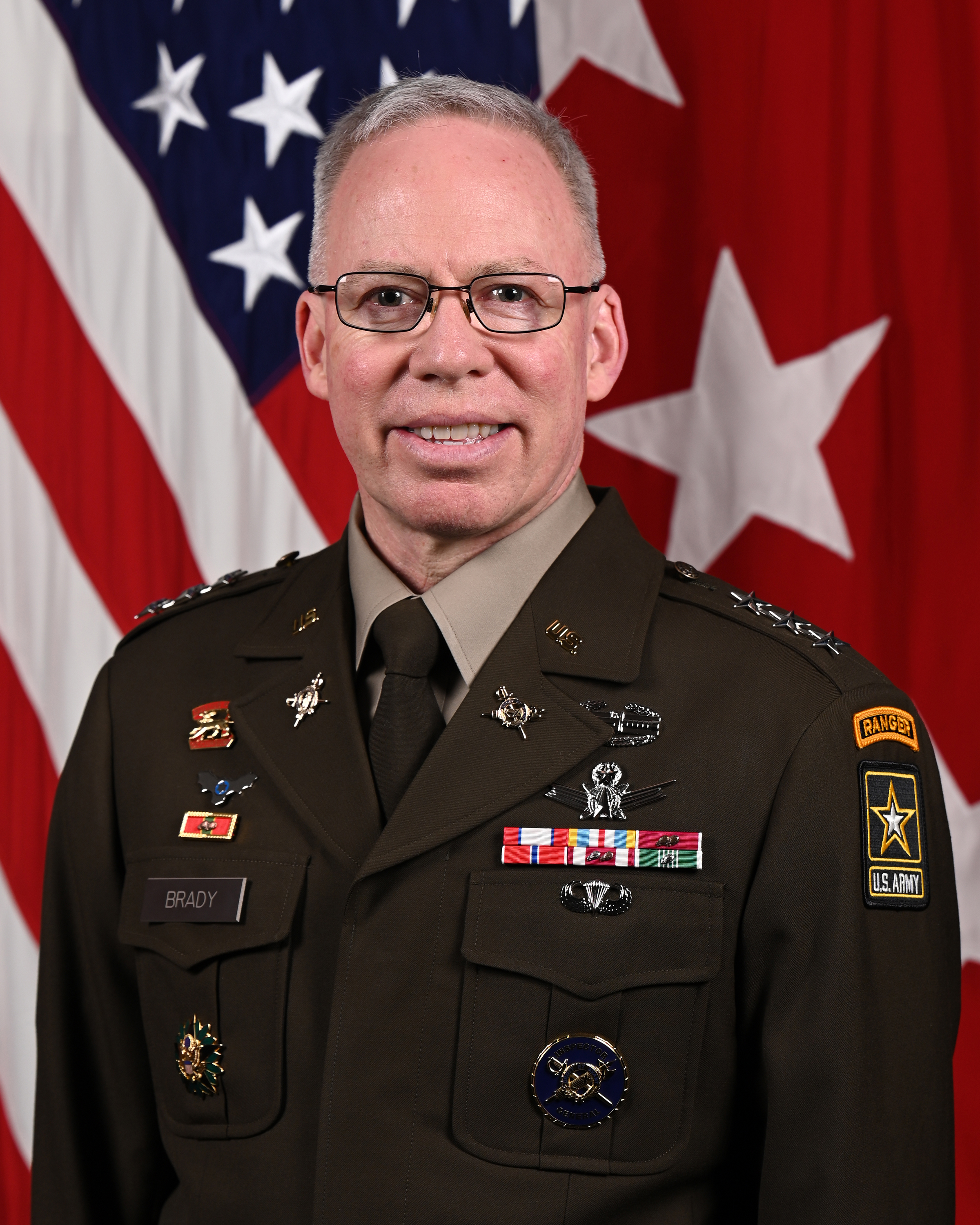
- Official portrait, 2025
- Born: 13 July 1969 (age 57); Wisconsin, U.S.
- Military career
- Allegiance: United States
- Branch: United States Army
- Service years: 1991–present
- Rank: Lieutenant General
- Commands: Office of the Inspector General of the United States Army; 10th Army Air and Missile Defense Command; White Sands Missile Range; 5th Battalion 52d Air Defense Artillery
- Awards: Army Distinguished Service Medal; Defense Superior Service Medal; Legion of Merit (3); Bronze Star Medal

Gregory Joseph Brady (born 13 July 1969) is a United States Army lieutenant general who is the 68th and current Inspector General of the United States Army. He was promoted to his current rank and sworn in as Inspector General on 17 March 2025. He previously served as the chief of staff of the United States Strategic Command. Prior to that, Brady was the commanding general of the 10th Army Air and Missile Defense Command.

In June 2024, Brady was nominated for promotion to lieutenant general and appointment as inspector general of the United States Army.

== Early life and education ==
Born in Wisconsin and raised in of Chicago, Illinois, Brady graduated from the United States Military Academy at West Point in 1991 as a decorated gymnast with a bachelor's degree in French. He furthered his education with a master's degree in international relations from The Catholic University of America and a master's degree in military studies from the U.S. Marine Corps Command and Staff College.

Military offices
Preceded by Eric L. Sanchez	Commanding General of the White Sands Missile Range; 2018–2019	Succeeded by David C. Trybula
Preceded by David E. Shank	Commanding General of the 10th Army Air and Missile Defense Command; 2019–2022	Succeeded by Maurice O. Barnett
Preceded by William W. Wheeler	Chief of Staff of the United States Strategic Command; 2022–2024	Succeeded by Christopher L. Eubank
Preceded by Donna W. Martin	Inspector General of the United States Army; 2025–present	Incumbent
