= David E. Shank =

David E. Shank (August 21, 1888 – March, 1972) was an American agriculturalist. He was the founder of and, for 40 years, general manager of the Valley of Virginia Cooperative Milk Producers Association. The Association was an early and successful example of the agricultural marketing cooperative movement in the United States. Among other accomplishments, the Association under Shank developed and marketed Shenandoah's Pride, a prominent milk brand today in the mid-Atlantic region of the United States.

== Early years ==
Shank grew up in Rockingham County, Virginia, in the Shenandoah Valley. As a young man, he moved to Minnesota to work as a manager at the Swift & Company meat-packing corporation. Swift, at that time, collaborated with other producers to manage price volatility (a strategy also practiced by agricultural marketing cooperatives under federal law). Shank was identified as rising young talent in the company, but decided to move back to Rockingham County to take advantage of high crop prices during World War I.

After the war, however, commodity prices dropped. For example, the price for raw milk paid by the county's main milk processing plant dropped by 70%. To address this problem, in 1922, ten Rockingham County farmers, including Shank, formed the Valley of Virginia Cooperative Milk Producers Association, headquartered in Harrisonburg. They enlisted 250 other local farmers to hold out for a better price from a local milk processing plant. The plant refused to buy milk from the Association but said it would buy milk individually from the farmers. However, most of the farmers refused to sell and the plant, facing a shortage of raw milk, agreed to negotiate to lease or sell the plant to the Association. Initially, the plant owners sought $40,000. After protracted negotiations, during which the Association explored constructing a new plant in the county, the plant was sold for $11,000 to the Association in 1923. Shank, who was initially appointed treasurer of the Association, became general manager in 1924.

== Growth of the Association ==
Shank served as general manager for 40 years. During this period, the Association expanded its product line, production facilities, distribution capabilities, and market geographies. It also acquired competitors, developed the retail brand Shenandoah Pride, and became a major provider of milk products in much of Virginia. In 1959, it entered its last remaining major Virginia market, northern Virginia, by acquiring several local dairies. Soon, Shenandoah's Pride milk began being served in Fairfax County schools, where it continues to be served today. Shank retired from the Association in 1965. The Association continued to grow until it was acquired by a predecessor of Dean Foods in 1997 for $110 million, the net proceeds of which were split among the Association's members, many of which were residents of Rockingham County.

== Personal life ==
Shank was born in 1889 and died in 1972. He was married to Bertha Bateman Bare and had three children: Maxene, Donald, and Charles.
