= Agathodorus =

Christian saint

Saint Agathodorus
- Residence: Thyatira, Asia Minor
- Died: 3rd century Pergamon, Asia Minor
- Feast: 13 April

Agathodorus (Greek: Ἀγαθόδωρος) was an early Christian martyr in Pergamon, Asia Minor.

== Life ==
Agathodorus was a servant of Carpus, Papylus, and Agathonice. He was killed by the Romans to encourage his Christian masters to denounce their faith, but they refused and were also martyred. Probably the martyrdom occurred during the persecution of the Christians under the Roman Emperor Decius, but some sources place it one hundred years earlier under the Emperor Marcus Aurelius. His feast day is 13 April.

== Butler's account ==
The hagiographer Alban Butler wrote in his Lives of the fathers, martyrs, and other principal saints (1821),

SS. Carpus, Bishop of Thyatira, in Asia Minor, Papylus, His Deacon, and Agathodorus Their Servant, Martyrs IN the persecution of Decius, in 251, they were apprehended and brought before Valerius, governor of Lesser Asia, who resided sometimes at Thyatira, sometimes at Sardis. The martyrs suffered much in dungeons in both those cities, and underwent three severe examinations; in the third, to intimidate the masters, Agathodorus was, in their presence; scourged to death with bull’s sinews. When the proconsul went to Pergamus, which city was the birth-place both of the bishop and his deacon, the two saints were dragged thither, and first the bishop, then the deacon, was beaten with knotty clubs, their sides burnt with torches, and the wounds rubbed over with salt. Some days after they were laid on iron spikes, their sides were again torn, and at length both were consumed by the flames, together with Agathonice, a sister of Papylus. See their acts, quoted by Eusebius, b. 4, c. 15. Tillemont, t. 3, p. 346.

== Sources ==
- Butler, Alban (1821), The lives of the fathers, martyrs, and other principal saints
- Monks of Ramsgate (1921), "CARPUS, PAPYLUS, AGATHONICA and AGATHODORUS (SSs) MM", The Book of saints : a dictionary of servants of God canonized by the Catholic Church :, St. Augustine's Abbey (Ramsgate, England): A. & C. Black, ltd.
- "Saint Agathodorus of Pergamus", CatholicSaints
