= Acts of Carpus, Papylus, and Agathonice =

Martyrdom account about three Christians traveling through Pergamum

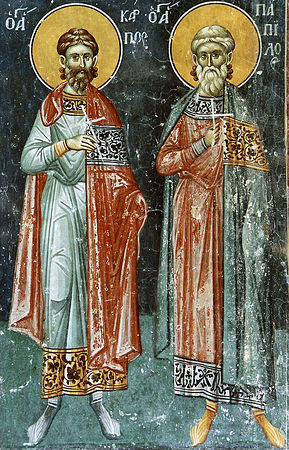
Carpus and Papylus

The Acts of Carpus, Papylus, and Agathonice is a martyrdom account about three Christians traveling through Pergamum until they are discovered by the pagan authority of the city and put to death by them. The date of the text is disputed amongst biblical scholars. Either from the second century AD of Marcus Aurelius's reign or the third century AD of Decius's reign.

== Narrative overview ==
Carpus, a bishop from Gurdos, Lydia, Papylus, a deacon from Thyatira, and Papylus's sister Agathonice were at the time, together in Pergamum. While present in the city, the Roman governor Pergamos invited them to eat meat that was offered to idols. Realizing this, both Carpus and Papylus refused because they were Christians. After being interrogated, the governor and the cities's counsel called, "Optimus" ordered them to sacrifice to their gods in the name of the emperor. Carpus was the first to refuse the counsel's orders because of his Christian faith. The consul had his servant Agathodorus scourged to death with bull's sinews to encourage the apostasy, but Carpus continued to refuse. The counsel ordered his death through hanging and to be clawed alive. Papylus, a wealthy Roman citizen, followed the footsteps of Carpus the same death and torture as Agathonice committed suicide after their deaths.

== Agathonice perceived in different versions of the acts ==
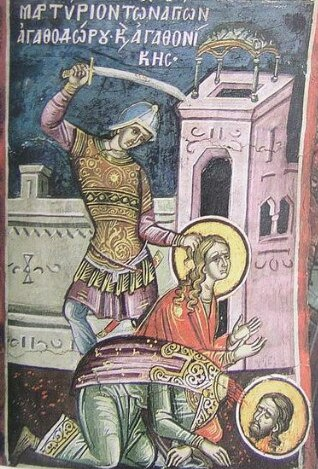
Fresco from Dionysiou Monastery

The earliest known woman to be martyred from Eusebius's written works, Agathonice witnessed the death of her brother Papylus and Bishop Carpus. Her death is presented differently amongst the Greek and Latin versions of the acts. Eusebius's Greek version of the text presents Agathonice as a bystander amongst the crowd. While watching Carpus's death in horror, Agathonice threw herself naked in the fire blazing pyre. Despite the crowd's effort to persuade her for the sake of her son, she shouted against them clarifying that God will have pity on her son. Eusebius inserts her account after Polycarp's martyrdom. The account of Agathonice was reported to be from a letter written by Christians who witnessed the event.

The Latin version has been defined as a longer and more detailed narrative. Instead of a bystander, Agathonice is a key witness in Carpus's trial. During his trial, she strips herself naked and the crowd becomes astonished by her action and her beauty. After Carpus is put to death, she was ordered to sacrifice to their gods. She refuses to do so, even though the crowd tried to persuade her for the sake of her children, she clarifies to them that God will watch her children. She was put to death by being hanged and burned.

== Manuscripts and possible dates of authorship ==
The only known manuscripts of the Acts of Carpus, Papylus, and Agathonice are preserved in Greek and Latin (Longer version). Eusebius places the persecutions during the reign of Marcus Aurelius, which some biblical scholars assign a date to the second century AD. However, the Latin version's qualities points to the third century AD of Decius's reign, and with these differences, scholars can't conclude the actual date because of the two suggested emperors in which the acts occurred.

== Bibliography ==
- Attridge, Harold W.; Hata, Gōhei (1992). Eusebius, Christianity, and Judaism. Wayne State University Press. ISBN 9780814323618.
- Butler, Alban (1821), The lives of the fathers, martyrs, and other principal saints
- Doyle, Peter; Butler, Alban; Burns, Paul (1999). Butler's Lives of the Saints. Liturgical Press. ISBN 9780814623800.
- Farmer, David (2011). The Oxford Dictionary of Saints (5th Revised ed.). Oxford University Press. ISBN 9780191036736.
- Ferguson, Everett (1999). Christianity in Relation to Jews, Greeks, and Romans. Taylor & Francis. ISBN 9780815330691.
- Ferguson, Everett (2013). Encyclopedia of Early Christianity (Second ed.). Routledge. ISBN 9781136611582.
- Middleton, Paul (2011). Martyrdom: A Guide for the Perplexed. A&C Black. ISBN 9780567336750.
- Streete, Gail Corrington (2009). Redeemed Bodies: Women Martyrs in Early Christianity. Westminster John Knox Press. ISBN 9780664233297.
