= Giuseppe Salvioli =

Italian footballer (born 1917)

Personal information
- Date of birth: 5 November 1917
- Place of birth: Modena, Italy
- Position: Midfielder

Senior career*
Years	Team	Apps	(Gls)
1937–1940	Carpi		
1940–1942	Perugia		
1942–1944	Roma	15	(1)
1945–1946	Lecce	8	(7)
1946–1947	Reggiana	10	(0)
1947–1949	Avellino		
- * Club domestic league appearances and goals

Giuseppe Salvioli (born 5 November 1917) was an Italian professional football player.

Salvioli played one game in the 1942/43 Serie A for A.S. Roma.
