= Gomidas Keumurdjian =

Armenian priest, martyr and saint

Blessed Gomidas Keumurdjian
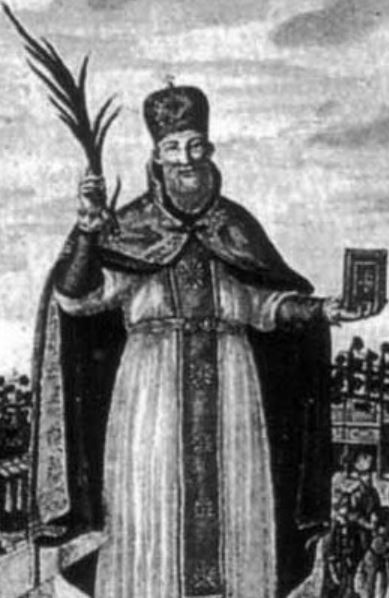
- Illustration of Blessed Gomidas Keumurdjian

Martyr
- Born: c. 1656; Constantinople, Ottoman Empire
- Died: 5 November 1707 (aged 51); Constantinople, Ottoman Empire
- Venerated in: Catholic Church
- Beatified: 23 June 1929, Saint Peter's Basilica by Pope Pius XI
- Feast: 5 November
- Attributes: Book of hours, martyr's palm
- Patronage: Armenia

Gomidas Keumurdjian (Armenian: Կոմիտաս Քէօմիւրճեան; 1656 – 5 November 1707), known as Cosma de Carbognano, was a married priest of the Armenian Apostolic Church and later a convert to the Armenian Catholic Church. At the insistence of the Armenian Apostolic Patriarch of Constantinople, Ter Gomidas was tried before an Islamic court and sentenced to death by the Qadi for treason against the Ottoman Sultan and for secretly baptizing Muslims. Gomidas, however, was offered a full pardon and his immediate release in return for his conversion to Islam, but he repeatedly refused and was publicly executed by beheading in the Samatya quarter of Istanbul. He is regarded by the Catholic Church as a martyr and has been venerated as a Blessed since 1929.

== Biography ==
Gomidas Keumurdjian was born in Constantinople, the son of an Armenian priest. He studied under a learned Vardapet and, before being ordained a Deacon, was married at about the age of twenty and eventually fathered seven children. Like his father, he too became a parish priest of the Armenian Apostolic Church and was stationed at the Church of St. George in Galata. His preaching attracted large audiences of not only Armenians, but also Ottoman Greeks and so many Muslims that Ter Gomidas had to regularly preach sermons in the Turkish language. He was also an author of Christian poetry and composed a verse paraphrase of the Acts of the Apostles.

There was, with the encouragement of French Jesuit and Capuchin missionaries, a movement within the various Eastern Orthodox and Oriental Orthodox Churches that favored reunion with Rome. Aided considerably by the extremely high level of education, rooted in both Medieval Scholasticism and Renaissance humanism that had been demanded before the ordination of Catholic priests after the Counter-Reformation, this movement was extremely successful. So many Eastern Christians were being won over to the Eastern Catholic Churches in Istanbul alone that Dr. Paul Rycaut, the Anglican chaplain to the British Ambassador to the Sublime Porte, commented, "So far have the Latins the advantage over the Greeks, as riches hath over poverty, or learning over ignorance."

In 1694, at the age of forty, Ter Gomidas and his family converted to the Armenian Catholic Church. Along with fellow priests Mekhitar Sebastatsi and Khatchatour Arakelian, Ter Gomidas became almost immediately one of the driving forces behind the Eastern Catholic movement among the Ottoman Armenians.

Even though Catholic and Miaphysite Armenian priests and laity both ministered to and attended the same parishes side by side, the steady growth of the Eastern Catholic Churches ultimately triggered an intensive anti-Catholic religious persecution by the Ottoman State at the insistence of the hierarchs of the Oriental Orthodox Churches. This was escalated against Catholic Armenians quite radically after Avedik I, the recently deposed Armenian Patriarch of Constantinople, was abducted in 1706 by the orders of Charles d'Argental, Comte de Fériol, the French ambassador to the Sublime Porte. Patriarch Avedik, who has since been proposed as a suspect for the famous Man in the Iron Mask, was smuggled to Marseille and then imprisoned at Mont-Saint-Michel and in the Bastille for stealing letters from the embassy's diplomatic pouch and lèse majesté against King Louis XIV.

Meanwhile, the Comte de Fériol repeatedly sent warnings that Ter Gomidas' life was in danger and offered to help him and his family escape the Ottoman Empire. Based on his own dreams and those reported to him by others, however, Ter Gomidas believed that it was God's will for him to remain at his parish ministry in Galata, even if it meant his own martyrdom.

== Martyrdom ==
On the evening of 23 October 1707 (according to the Julian Calendar) or 3 November 1707 (according to the Gregorian Calendar), Ter Gomidas was arrested by the newly appointed Patriarch Hovhannes VII, who also ordered the arrests of several Armenian bishops, 40 priests, and 180 laity.

Along with eight other Armenian priests who were also suspected of conversion to Catholicism, Ter Gomidas was brought to trial before an Armenian millet court for treason against the Sultan and disturbing the Armenian people's peace by becoming "Franks". Ter Gomidas, acting as, "spokesman for the group, asserted that they had indeed become Catholics, but not Franks. Catholicism meant religion, not nationality. His logic failed to convince the court and he and the eight others were taken to the court of a Turkish Qadi and there presented as traitors."

The Qadi was at first reluctant to proceed with the case, until Patriarch Hovhannes also accused Ter Gomidas of secretly instructing and then baptizing large numbers of Muslims and then arranging for the Comte de Fériol to smuggle them out of the Ottoman Empire so that his converts could practice their new faith openly. In response, Ter Gomidas was sentenced to death for treason against Sultan Ahmet III and for violating the precepts of Sharia Law governing the aiding of apostasy. As was customary in the Ottoman Empire at the time, the Qadi offered Ter Gomidas and his eight priestly codefendants a full pardon and their freedom in return for their immediate conversion to Islam. Although the other eight priests immediately agreed, only Ter Gomidas refused, saying, "I will not exchange my gold for your copper."

Accompanied by his wife and children and a crowd of three thousand witnesses, Ter Gomidas was led out of prison on 5 November 1707 to the Samatya quarter of Istanbul. Like the many other martyred priests under the Caesars, Ter Gomidas was followed to the place of execution by his wife and children. Ter Gomidas' wife encouraged him to remain firm, while his sister, Irena, begged Ter Gomidas not to bereave his family. Irena urged her brother to instead pretend to convert to Islam, while remaining a crypto-Christian.

Unmoved, Ter Gomidas continued until he reached the crossroads called Parmak Kapu, where he was ordered to kneel. Ter Gomidas did so, facing Jerusalem, much to the dismay of the crowd, who repeatedly called in vain for him to turn and face Mecca instead. When the executioner approached with a drawn sword and also urged Ter Gomidas to save his life through conversion to Islam, Ter Gomidas replied, "No, do your work", and began reciting the Nicene Creed in the Classical Armenian liturgical language. His prayer only ceased when he was beheaded.

== Legacy ==
After his death, Ter Gomidas was buried in the Armenian cemetery of Constantinople, where a mnemósynon was offered for him by Greek Orthodox priests of the Ecumenical Patriarchate, because no Armenian Catholic priest dared to come out of hiding to do so. His body was later re-exhumed and taken for veneration to the Jesuit novitiate at Lyon, where it was lost during the Reign of Terror.

Due to the covert operations of the Comte de Fériol, Donald Attwater has termed Ter Gomidas, "a double victim, of the malice of his enemies and of the un-scrupulosity of his friends, for the intrigues of the second gave pretext and occasion to the first, though doubtless they would have found others."

The execution of Ter Gomidas, however, caused such outrage even among Miaphysite Armenians that the Comte de Fériol was able to arrange, through judicious bribery of the Sultan's courtiers and officials, to have Patriarch Hovhannes deposed and replaced by Patriarch Sahag I, who was known to be a moderate. The persecution of Catholic Armenians according ceased, but only temporarily.

According to Donald Attwater, to encourage the Catholic movement among the Ottoman Armenians, the Vatican had granted the extremely rare privilege of Communicatio in sacris between the Catholic and Armenian Apostolic Churches with the hope that acceptance of the Council of Chalcedon, the Council of Florence, and full communion could ultimately be achieved. The religious persecution of Catholic Armenians by the Armenian Apostolic Church and the House of Osman, however, ultimately made this impossible. For this reason, Abraham Petros I Ardzivian became the first Patriarch of Cilicia and head of the Armenian Catholic Church in 1742.

Until the 1915 Armenian Genocide destroyed the historically large Armenian Catholic community in Istanbul, the anniversary of Blessed Gomidas' martyrdom was commemorated every year with a religious procession to the site of his death. Now, due to widespread anti-Armenian sentiment, the few Catholics Armenians who remain living in Istanbul keep a much lower profile. Along with an unknown number of Hidden Armenians, as of 2008 the official population of the Armenian Catholic Archeparchy of Istanbul, which looks after all surviving Catholic Armenians in Turkey, numbered only 3,650.

== Veneration ==
On 23 June 1929, Pope Pius XI beatified Keumurdjian and his feast day is celebrated every year on 5 November.

A chapel dedicated to Blessed Gomidas is located at the left transept of the Church of San Nicola da Tolentino agli Orti Sallustiani in Rome. The image above the altar, Preaching of the Blessed Gomidas, was painted by Mario Barberis in 1929, the year of Keumurdjian's beatification. Another painting, depicting his martyrdom, is at the Church of Santa Maria della Scala.

Devotion to Blessed Gomidas is still practiced by Armenian Catholics in Istanbul.

== Family ==
One of his sons was Jean de Carbognano (c.1706-1763), who, after becoming an orphan, was taken in and educated by Latin Rite missionnaires. He entered the service of the Kingdom of Naples as a dragoman. His own son, Cosimo de Carbognano (1749-1807), entered the service of the Kingdom of Naples and later of the King of Spain and became Knight of the Order of the Golden Spur. He published in Latin the principles of Turkish grammar for the use of Catholic missionaries in the Ottoman Empire.
