= Augustin de La Balme =

French soldier (1733–1780)

- Born: August 28, 1733 near Saint-Antoine-l'Abbaye, France
- Died: November 5, 1780 (aged 47); Near present-day Columbia City, Indiana
- Military career
- Allegiance: France
- Branch: Cavalry
- Rank: Colonel (United States)
- Conflicts: La Balme's Defeat

Augustin Mottin de La Balme (French pronunciation: [oɡystɛ̃ mɔtɛ̃ də la balm]; 28 August 1733 – 5 November 1780) was a French soldier who served in Europe during the Seven Years' War and in the North America during the American Revolutionary War. His attempt to capture Fort Detroit in 1780 ended in defeat when he was ambushed by forces under Chief Little Turtle.

== Seven Years' War ==
Augustin Mottin was born 29 August 1733, in the French Alps near Saint-Antoine. He was the 9th of 13 children born to Antoine Mottin, a tanner, and Marguerite Reynaud. Augustin served as a trooper in the 1st Company of the Gardes du Corps du Roi during the Seven Years' War. He fought at the Battle of Minden.

Following the war, Augustin studied horsemanship, eventually becoming master at the Gendarmerie's Riding School in Lunéville. Mottin was promoted to Fourrier-Major in 1766 and retired with a pension in 1773. Using the assumed name "Mottin de La Balme," he wrote a book on horsemanship in 1773, titled Essai sur l'équitation ou principes raisonnés sur l'Art de monter et de dresser les chevaux. He followed with a book on cavalry tactics in 1776.

== American Revolution ==
Augustin de La Balme received a letter of recommendation from Benjamin Franklin and left for the United States to assist in the American Revolution. He arrived with a group of French volunteers that included the Marquis de Lafayette, and expressed a "love of liberty" as the motivation for his service. In 1777, he was appointed as the Continental Army's Inspector General of Cavalry. Due to his performance in the 1777 Battle of Brandywine, however, Casimir Pulaski was made a Major General over all cavalry, including La Balme, who was not at the battle. When he learned that he would no longer be in command of the United States Cavalry, La Balme resigned in October 1777.

=== Western Campaign ===
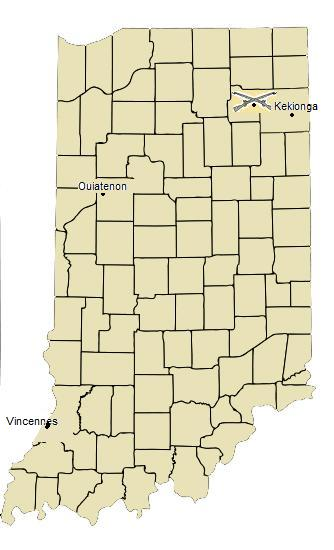

In 1780, allegedly under secret orders from General Washington, but as likely acting on his own, La Balme traveled down the Ohio River to Kaskaskia. The success of General Clark's capture of Fort Sackville at Vincennes inspired La Balme to attempt a similar feat against the British at Fort Detroit. La Balme arrived in Kaskaskia as a French officer and was "greeted as Masiah" by the local Canadien residents, who had been living under British rule for over a decade. He represented himself as a representative of Louis XVI of France and gathered a list of grievances from residents living under the rule of the Virginians, which was to be delivered to the French Ambassador at Fort Pitt. La Balme openly disdained Clark, whom he considered an uneducated woodsman. He coordinated a diversionary attack against Fort St. Joseph, then began his journey to Detroit, recruiting militia from among the Canadian citizens of Kaskaskia, Cahokia, and Vincennes. At Vincennes, he started up the Wabash River with the expectation of adding to his force from the Canadian villages of Ouiatenon (present-day West Lafayette, Indiana) and Kekionga (present-day Fort Wayne). La Balme expected Canadian residents at Fort Detroit to join him once they arrived. La Balme kept the French ambassador, Anne-César de La Luzerne, updated on his movements, and the expedition marched under a French flag.

La Balme's mounted force moved so quickly that it had little opposition until reaching Kekionga, where La Balme had planned to arrest Charles Beaubien, the British agent. Beaubien and many of the Miami were not there, however, so the force raised the French flag and raided British stores for two weeks while awaiting reinforcements that never arrived. Upon learning of the return of a Miami hunting party to Kekionga, Le Balme departed to raid another trading post on the Eel River. La Balme left twenty French soldiers to guard the captured stores at Kekionga and marched his force out over the Eel River trail.

The Miami Indians, learning of the intrusion, destroyed the small group of men left at Kekionga. The group of twenty French soldiers left at Kekionga were slaughtered to a man. Chief Little Turtle, who lived in a village along the Eel River, received permission from the Kekionga Miami to lead an attack. He gathered available warriors and attacked La Balme in camp at dawn on 5 November before he reached the Eel River trading post and just 3 miles from Little Turtle's village. La Balme and his men fortified themselves on the banks of the river but were only able to fire one volley before being overwhelmed. The ensuing battle was entirely one-sided; only a few survivors managed to escape. Augustin de La Balme died in the battle known as La Balme's Defeat.

=== Legacy ===
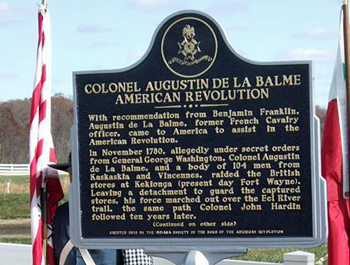

Although La Balme's expedition failed, it did cause considerable concern for the British. Major de Peyster subsequently deployed a detachment of British Rangers to protect Kekionga. Fort Detroit would remain under British control until the Jay Treaty was ratified in 1796. (Detroit was again surrendered to the British in the War of 1812, but was returned after the war.) The British commander at Detroit, Major Arent DePeyster, thought La Balme had survived and recorded a log entry dated 13 November:

A detachment of Canadians from the Illinois and Post Vincennes arrived Kekionga about 10 days ago, and entered the village, took the horses, destroyed the horned cattle and plundered a store I allowed to be kept there for the convenience of the Indians, soon after assembled and attacked the Canadians, led by a French colonel. … The Miami resisting the fire of the enemy, had five of their party killed, being, however, more resolute than savages are in general, they beat off the enemy, killed 30 and took La Balme prisoner with his papers ... I expect the Colonel in every hour …

- The Spanish Governor at St. Louis, Francisco Cruzat, wrote
  … I am very sorry for what has happened to Monsieur La Balme … [he] having, perhaps, attempted with imprudence an undertaking which needed more time, more strength and better circumstances …
