= 2020 Ypres Rally =

2020 edition of Ypres Rally

2020 Rally Belgium: 56. Renties Ypres Rally Belgium 2020
- Part of the 2020 World Rally Championship
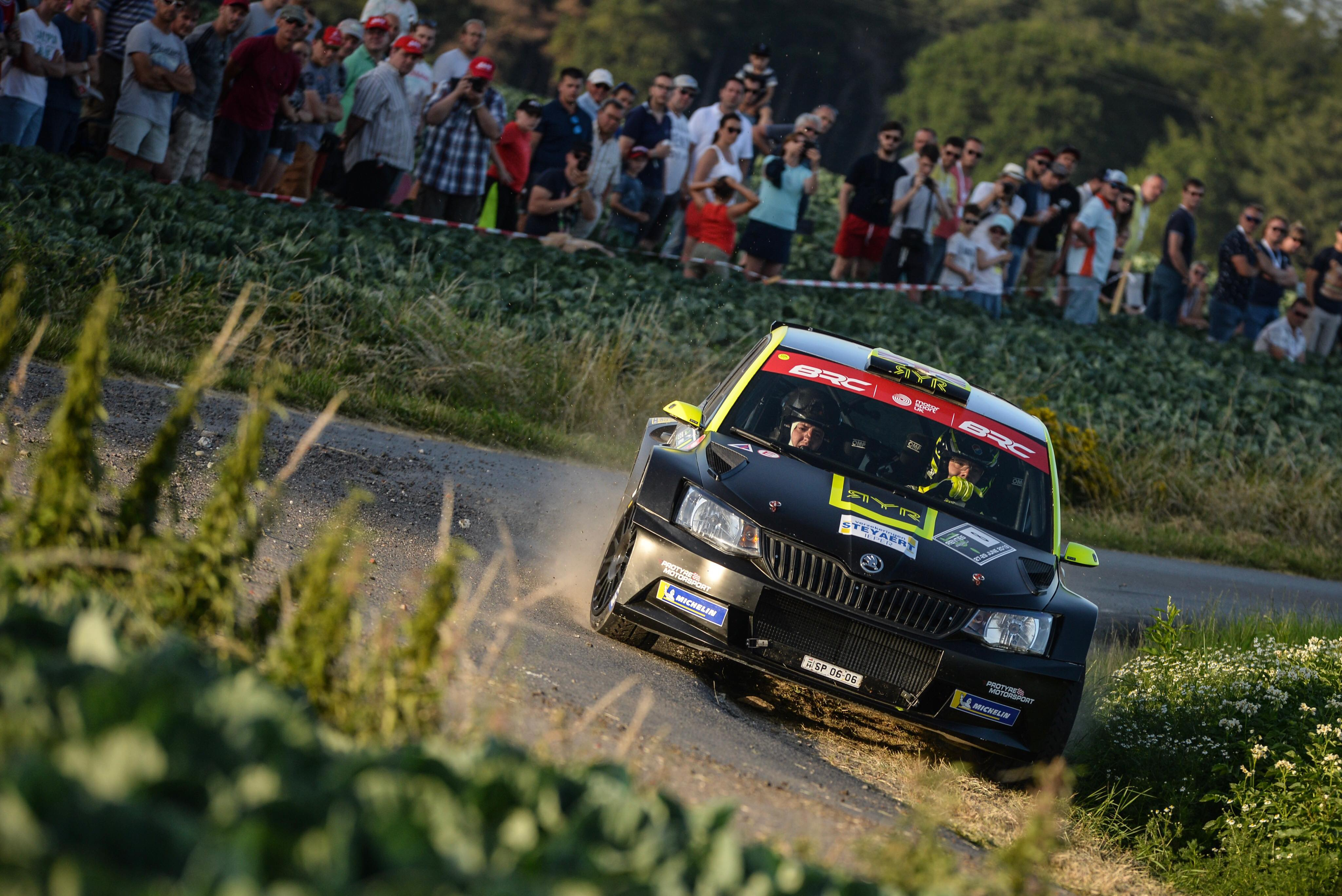
- Ypres Rally features narrow asphalt lanes and big ditches.
- Host country: Belgium
- Rally base: Ypres, West Flanders
- Dates run: 20 – 22 November 2020
- Start location: Zonnebeke, West Flanders
- Finish location: Stavelot, Liège
- Stages: 23 (265.69 km; 165.09 miles)
- Stage surface: Tarmac
- Transport distance: 633.66 km (393.74 miles)
- Overall distance: 899.35 km (558.83 miles)

Statistics
- Cancellation: Rally cancelled due to COVID-19 pandemic.

The 2020 Rally Belgium (also known as Renties Ypres Rally Belgium 2020) was a motor racing event for rally cars that was scheduled to hold between 20 and 22 November 2020, but was cancelled due to the COVID-19 pandemic. It was set to mark the fifty-sixth running of Ypres Rally and was planned to be the seventh round of the 2020 World Rally Championship, World Rally Championship-2 and World Rally Championship-3. It was also going to be the final round of the Junior World Rally Championship. The 2020 event was set to be based in Ypres in West Flanders and was scheduled to be contested over twenty-three special stages. The rally was planned to cover a total competitive distance of 265.69 km (165.09 mi).

== Background ==
=== Schedule changes and event inclusion ===
Following the cancellation of 2020 Rally Japan, the Ypres Rally of Belgium replaced Rally Japan to hold the seventh round of the championship. This would mark the Ypres Rally run as a WRC event for the first time. The country was set to become the thirty-fourth nation to stage a championship round in the WRC. Unfortunately, the rally was eventually announced to be called off due to the COVID-19 pandemic.

=== Route ===
The first two days of action would take place in the area around Ypres, while Sunday's final leg would be focused on the iconic Circuit de Spa-Francorchamps in Stavelot, with the rally-closing Power Stage featuring the famous Eau Rouge-Raidillon section of the track. This meant the Sunday's route would run alongside the 2020 World RX of Benelux of the World Rallycross Championship.

==== Itinerary ====
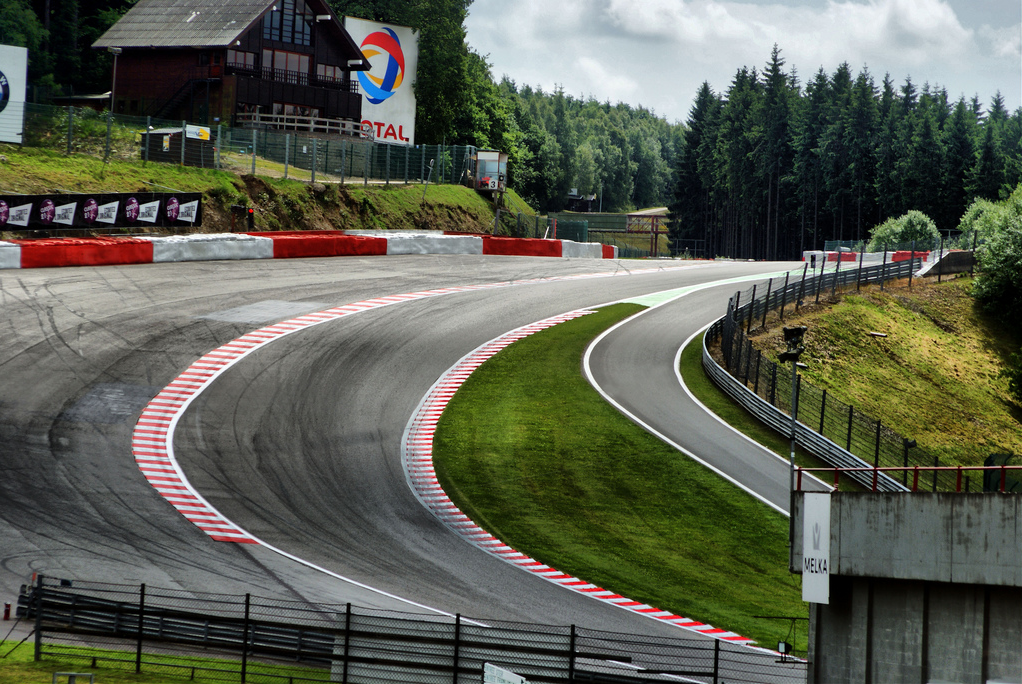
The rally's final stage was set to take action in the Eau Rouge-Raidillon section of Circuit de Spa-Francorchamps track.

All dates and times are BET (UTC+1).

Date	Time	No.	Stage name	Distance
N/A	08:31	—	Langemark [Shakedown]	9.81 km
Leg 1 — 104.71 km
N/A	13:38	SS1	Zonnebeke 1	9.48 km
N/A	14:31	SS2	Wijtschate 1	12.49 km
N/A	15:09	SS3	Kemmelberg 1	13.13 km
N/A	15:59	SS4	Reninge 1	11.82 km
N/A	16:36	SS5	Vieteren	10.87 km
N/A	19:08	SS6	Zonnebeke 2	9.48 km
N/A	20:01	SS7	Wijtschate 2	12.49 km
N/A	20:39	SS8	Kemmelberg 2	13.13 km
N/A	21:27	SS9	Reninge 2	11.82 km
Leg 2 — 114.06 km
N/A	09:38	SS10	Watou 1	14.02 km
N/A	10:39	SS11	Dikkebus 1	12.53 km
N/A	11:20	SS12	Westouter 1	8.16 km
N/A	12:08	SS13	Middelhoek-Mesen 1	7.95 km
N/A	12:46	SS14	Zillebeke 1	14.37 km
N/A	15:08	SS15	Watou 2	14.02 km
N/A	16:09	SS16	Dikkebus 2	12.53 km
N/A	16:50	SS17	Westouter 2	8.16 km
N/A	17:38	SS18	Middelhoek-Mesen 2	7.95 km
N/A	18:16	SS19	Zillebeke 2	14.37 km
Leg 3 — 46.92 km
N/A	09:08	SS20	Circuit de Spa 1	10.43 km
N/A	10:04	SS21	Ster	9.25 km
N/A	10:49	SS22	Bellevaux	14.62 km
N/A	12:18	SS23	Circuit de Spa 2 [Power Stage]	12.62 km

Previous rally: N/A	2020 FIA World Rally Championship	Next rally: N/A
Previous rally: 2019 Ypres Rally	2020 Ypres Rally	Next rally: 2021 Ypres Rally
