= 2020 Rally Japan =

2020 edition of Rally Japan

2020 Rally Japan: 7. Rally Japan
- Part of the 2020 World Rally Championship
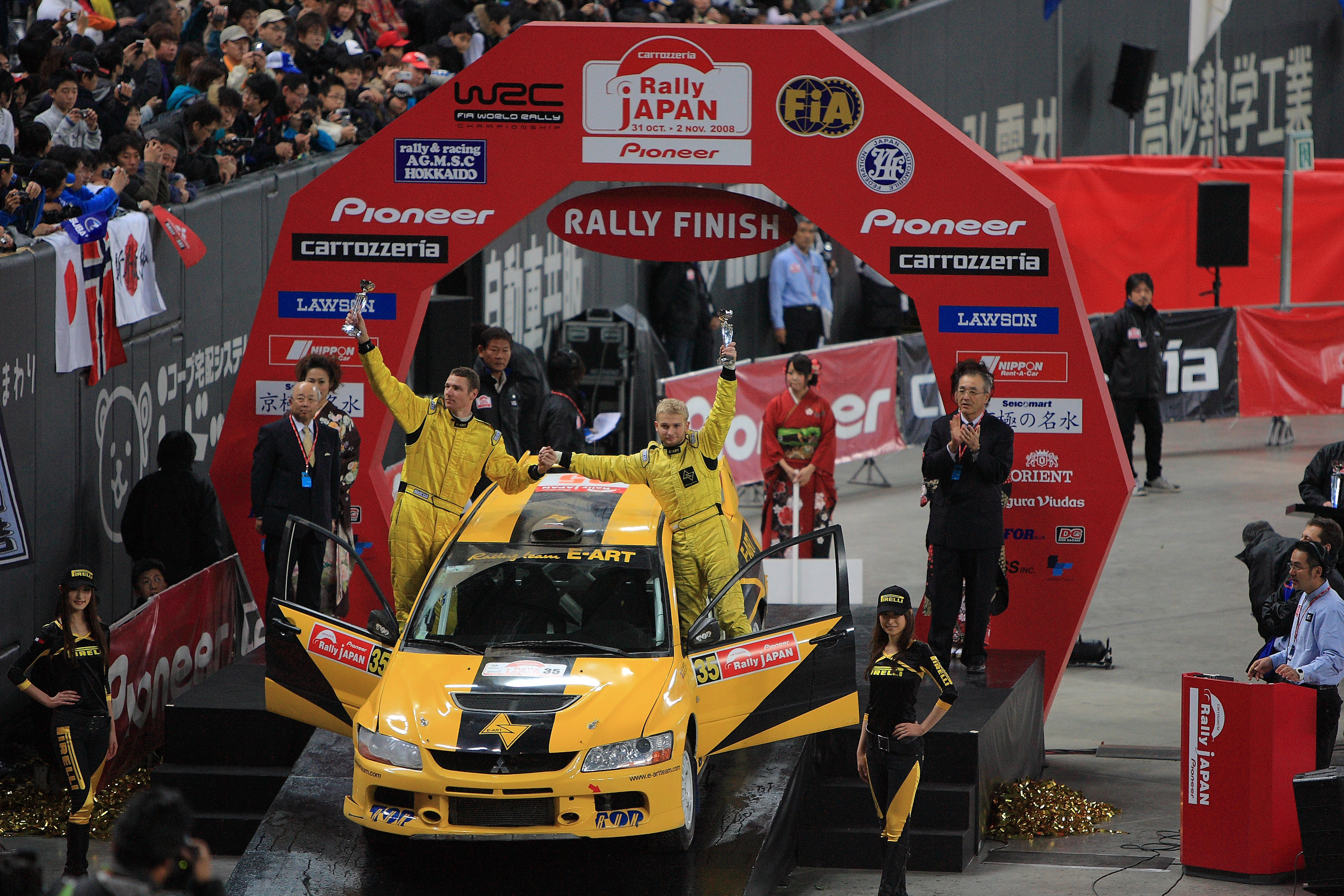
- Rally Japan was replaced by Ypres Rally as a result of the COVID-19 pandemic.
- Host country: Japan
- Rally base: Nagoya, Chūbu
- Held on: Scheduled for 19–22 November 2020
- Start location: Aichi Commemorative Park, Nagoya
- Finish location: Aichi Commemorative Park, Nagoya
- Stages: 19 (307.78 km; 191.25 miles)
- Stage surface: Tarmac
- Transport distance: 715.77 km (444.76 miles)
- Overall distance: 1,023.55 km (636.00 miles)

Statistics
- Cancellation: Rally cancelled due to border restrictions.

The 2020 Rally Japan (also known as the Rally Japan 2020) was a motor racing event for rally cars that was scheduled to be held over four days between 19 and 22 November 2020, but was cancelled due to the COVID-19 pandemic. It was set to mark the seventh running of Rally Japan and planned to be the final round of the 2020 World Rally Championship, World Rally Championship-2 and World Rally Championship-3. The 2020 event was scheduled to be based in Nagoya in Chūbu.

Sébastien Ogier and Julien Ingrassia were the defending rally winners. Citroën World Rally Team, the team they drove for in 2010, were the reigning manufacturers' winners, but would not defending their titles after parent company Citroën withdrew from the sport.

== Background ==
=== Route ===
==== Itinerary ====
All dates and times are JST (UTC+9).

Date	Time	No.	Stage name	Distance
—N/a	08:56	—	Expo Park R Short [Shakedown]	4.78 km
Leg 1 — 153.68 km
—N/a	07:33	SS1	Isegami Tunnel 1	23.82 km
—N/a	08:36	SS2	Inabu Dam 1	21.38 km
—N/a	09:34	SS3	Shitara Town 1	31.64 km
—N/a	13:37	SS4	Isegami Tunnel 2	23.82 km
—N/a	14:40	SS5	Inabu Dam 2	21.38 km
—N/a	15:38	SS6	Shitara Town 2	31.64 km
Leg 2 — 103.86 km
—N/a	07:23	SS7	Nukata Forest 1	20.63 km
—N/a	08:08	SS8	Lake Mikawa 1	20.06 km
—N/a	09:04	SS9	Shinshiro City 1	7.65 km
—N/a	10:30	SS10	SSS Okazaki Central Park 1	1.20 km
—N/a	13:45	SS11	SSS Okazaki Central Park 2	1.20 km
—N/a	14:23	SS12	Nukata Forest 2	20.63 km
—N/a	15:08	SS13	Lake Mikawa 2	20.06 km
—N/a	16:04	SS14	Shinshiro City 2	7.65 km
—N/a	18:46	SS15	Expo Park R Short	4.78 km
Leg 3 — 50.24 km
—N/a	08:43	SS16	Ena City	21.47 km
—N/a	09:36	SS17	Nenoue Plateau	11.63 km
—N/a	11:08	SS18	Expo Park 1	8.57 km
—N/a	13:18	SS19	Expo Park 2 [Power Stage]	8.57 km

=== Preparation and cancellation ===
Rally Japan was scheduled to return to the calendar for the first time since 2010, replacing Rally Australia as the final round of the championship. The rally was scheduled to move its headquarters from Hokkaidō to a new base in Nagoya and was to be run on tarmac rather than gravel. A candidate event had run in 2019. However, in response to the national COVID-19 pandemic, the Japanese government had increased the country's border restrictions, which led to the cancellation of the rally. The vacant spot left by the rally was taken by Belgium.

Previous rally: N/A	2020 FIA World Rally Championship	Next rally: N/A
Previous rally: 2010 Rally Japan	2020 Rally Japan	Next rally: ~~2021 Rally Japan~~; 2022 Rally Japan
