= 2020 Wales Rally GB =

Rally car race

2020 Wales Rally GB: 76. Wales Rally GB
- Part of the 2020 World Rally Championship
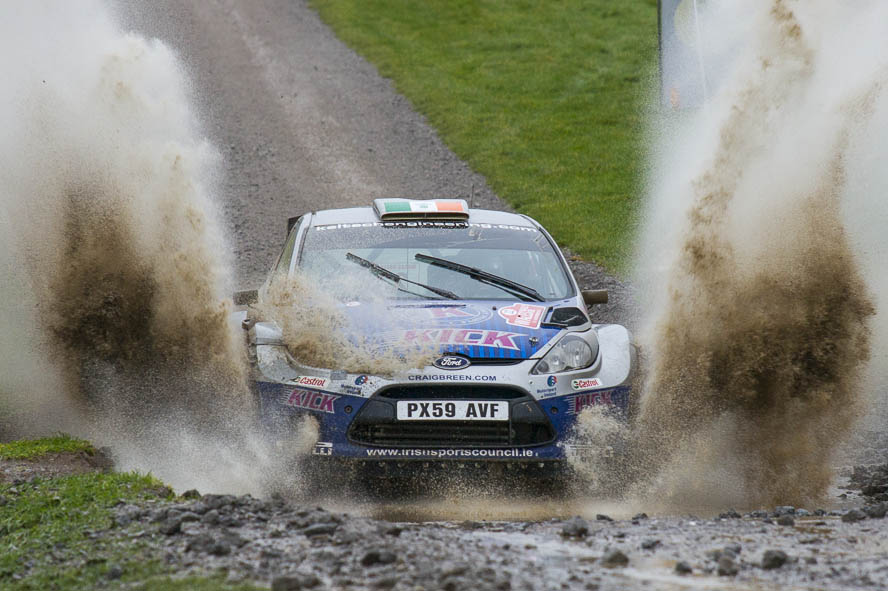
- The rally was the fifth event of the season cancelled due to the COVID-19 pandemic.
- Host country: United Kingdom
- Rally base: Deeside, Flintshire
- Held on: Scheduled for 29 October – 1 November 2020
- Stage surface: Gravel

Statistics
- Cancellation: Rally cancelled due to COVID-19 pandemic.

The 2020 Wales Rally GB (also known as the Wales Rally GB 2020) was a motor racing event for rally cars that was scheduled to be held over four days between 29 October and 1 November 2020, but was cancelled due to the COVID-19 pandemic for the first time since 1967 which was cancelled due to foot and mouth crisis. It was set to mark the seventy-sixth running of Wales Rally GB and planned to be the twelfth round of the 2020 World Rally Championship, World Rally Championship-2 and World Rally Championship-3. It was also planned to run as the fourth round of the 2020 Junior World Rally Championship. The 2020 event was scheduled to be based in Deeside in Flintshire.

Ott Tänak and Martin Järveoja were the defending rally winners. The team they drove for in 2019, Toyota Gazoo Racing WRT, were the defending manufacturers' winners. Kalle Rovanperä and Jonne Halttunen were the defending winners in the World Rally Championship-2 category, (Note: The championship was known as the World Rally Championship-2 Pro in 2019.) but they would not defend their titles as they were promoted to the higher class. In the World Rally Championship-3 category, Petter Solberg and Phil Mills were the reigning rally winners, but they would not defend their titles either as they were retired from the sport. (Note: The championship was known as the World Rally Championship-2 in 2019.) Tom Kristensson and Henrik Appelskog were the reigning rally winners in the Junior World Rally Championship.

== Notes ==
Previous rally: N/A	2020 FIA World Rally Championship	Next rally: N/A
Previous rally: 2019 Wales Rally GB	2020 Wales Rally GB	Next rally: TBD
