= 2020 WRC2 Championship =

Rally championship organised by FIA

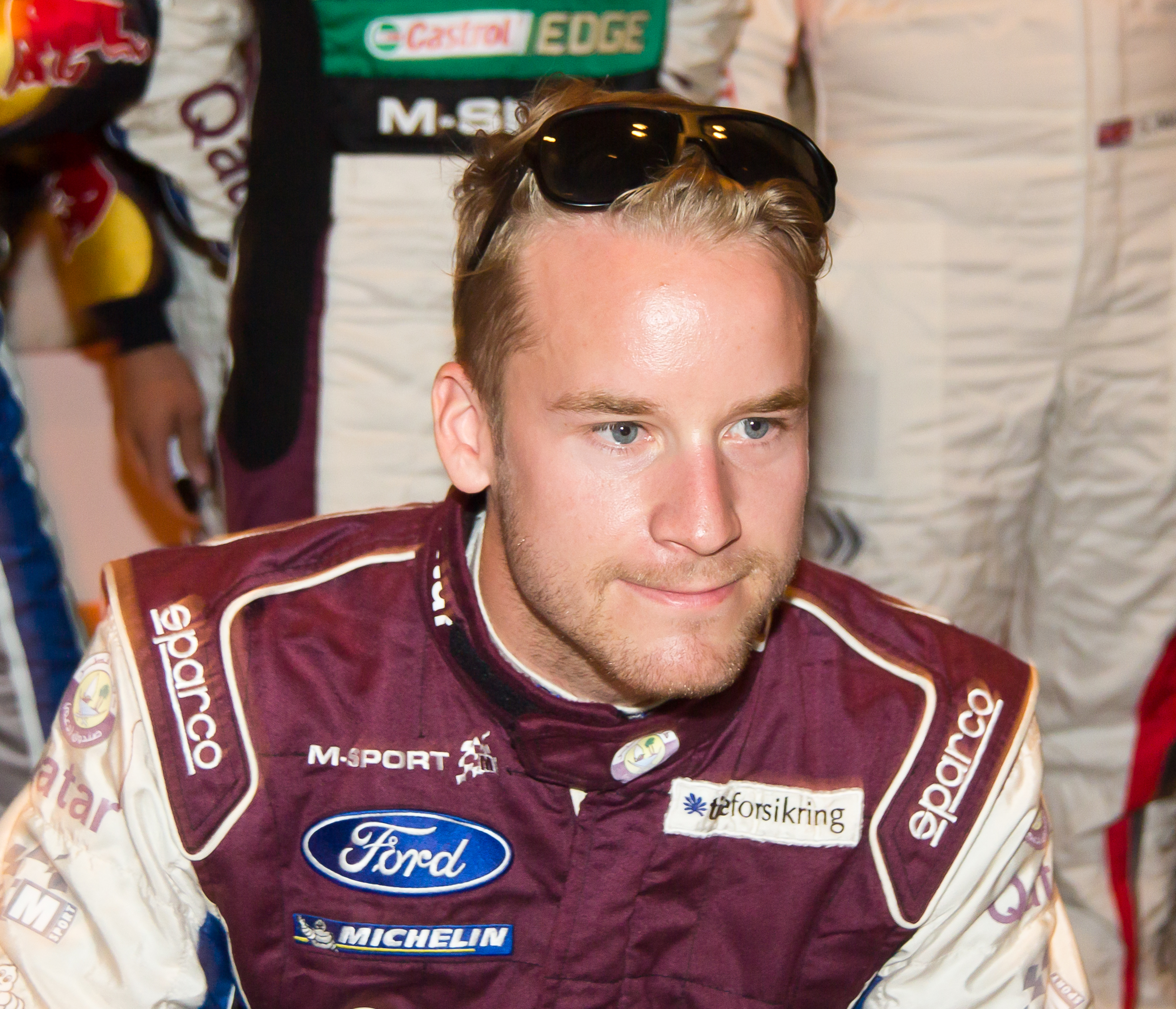
Mads Østberg won the 2020 WRC-2 category.

The 2020 FIA WRC2 Championship was the eighth season of WRC2, a rallying championship organised and governed by the Fédération Internationale de l'Automobile as the second-highest tier of international rallying. The category was open to cars entered by manufacturers and complying with R5 regulations.

Kalle Rovanperä and Jonne Halttunen were the reigning drivers' and co-drivers' champions, (Note: Rovanperä and Halttunen won their titles when the championship was known as WRC2 Pro.) but they did not defend their titles as they were contesting the World Rally Championship with Toyota.

At the conclusion of the championship, Mads Østberg and Torstein Eriksen won the Drivers' and Co-Drivers' championships, while Toksport WRT won the teams' title.

== Calendar ==
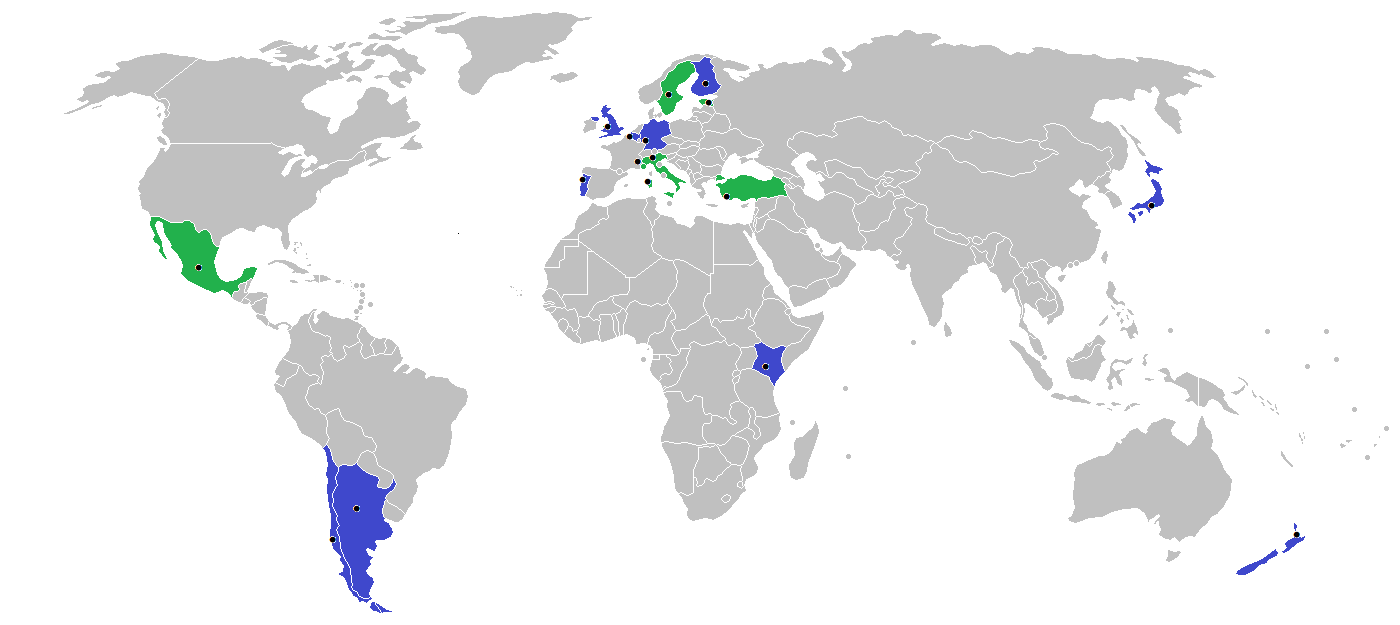
A map showing the locations of the rallies in the 2020 championship. Contested events are in green, while cancelled events are in blue. Event headquarters are marked with a black dot.

The 2020 championship was due to be contested over thirteen rounds in Europe, Africa, Asia, the Middle East, North and South America, and Oceania, but the calendar was reduced to seven rounds due to the COVID-19 pandemic.

Round	Start date	Finish date	Rally	Rally headquarters	Surface	Stages	Distance	Ref.
1	23 January	26 January	(Monaco) Rallye Automobile Monte Carlo	Gap, Provence-Alpes-Côte d'Azur (Note: The rally base of the Monte Carlo Rally was located in France.)	Mixed (Note: The Monte Carlo Rally is run on a tarmac and snow surface.)	16	304.28 km	
2	13 February	16 February	Rally Sweden	Torsby, Värmland	Snow	11	171.64 km (Note: The route of Rally Sweden was shortened from 301.26 km over 19 stages to 9 stages totalling 148.55 km. The route was shortened due to a lack of snow and bad weather conditions.)	
3	12 March	15 March	(Mexico) Rally Guanajuato México	León, Guanajuato	Gravel	21	268.84 km (Note: The route of Rally Mexico was shortened by 56.01 km.)	
4	4 September	6 September	Rally Estonia	Tartu, Tartu County	Gravel	17	232.64 km	
5	18 September	20 September	Rally of Turkey	Marmaris, Muğla	Gravel	12	223.00 km	
6	8 October	11 October	(Italy) Rally Italia Sardegna	Alghero, Sardinia	Gravel	16	238.84 km	
7	3 December	6 December	(Italy) ACI Rally Monza	Monza, Lombardy	Tarmac	16	239.20 km	

The following rounds were included on the original calendar published by WRC Promoter GmbH, but were later cancelled:

Start date	Finish date	Rally	Rally headquarters	Surface	Stages	Distance	Cancellation reason	Ref.
16 April	19 April	Rally Chile	Concepción, Biobío	Gravel	—N/a	—N/a	Political unrest	
23 April (Note: The running dates of Rally Argentina were initially scheduled to be 30 April to 3 May.)	26 April	Rally Argentina	Villa Carlos Paz, Córdoba	Gravel	16	322.36 km	COVID-19 pandemic	
21 May	24 May	Rally de Portugal	Matosinhos, Porto	Gravel	22	331.10 km	COVID-19 pandemic	
16 July	19 July	Safari Rally Kenya	Nairobi	Gravel	18	315.12 km	COVID-19 pandemic	
6 August	9 August	Rally Finland	Jyväskylä, Central Finland	Gravel	24	321.87 km	COVID-19 pandemic	
3 September	6 September	Rally New Zealand	Auckland, Te Ika-a-Māui	Gravel	—N/a	—N/a	COVID-19 pandemic	
15 October	18 October	(Germany) ADAC Rallye Deutschland	Bostalsee, Saarland	Tarmac	—N/a	—N/a	COVID-19 pandemic	
29 October	1 November	(United Kingdom) Wales Rally GB	Llandudno, Conwy	Gravel	—N/a	—N/a	COVID-19 pandemic	
19 November	22 November	Rally Japan	Nagoya, Chūbu	Tarmac	19	307.78 km	COVID-19 pandemic	
20 November	22 November	Renties Ypres Rally Belgium	Ypres, West Flanders	Tarmac	23	265.69 km	COVID-19 pandemic	

=== Calendar changes ===
With the addition of Rally Chile to the calendar in 2019, the FIA opened the tender process for new events to join the championship in 2020. Bids to revive Rally Japan and the Safari Rally were received, and candidate events were run in 2019. Both events were accepted to the 2020 calendar, as was a proposal to revive Rally New Zealand. However, none of the aforementioned events were run due to the COVID-19 pandemic.

- The Safari Rally was scheduled to be run as a World Championship event for the first time since 2002. The event was to be based in the Kenyan capital Nairobi and feature stages around Lake Naivasha. In contrast to the event's traditional endurance format, which featured stages hundreds of kilometres long, the 2020 Safari Rally was planned to follow a compact route to comply with FIA regulations mandating the maximum route distance.
- Rally Japan was scheduled to return to the calendar for the first time since 2010, replacing Rally Australia as the final round of the championship. The rally was scheduled to move away from its original headquarters in Hokkaidō to a new base in Nagoya and was to be run on tarmac rather than gravel.
- Rally New Zealand was scheduled to return to the calendar for the first time since 2012. The event was planned to return to Auckland.

The addition of these events saw the Tour de Corse and the Rallies of Catalunya and Australia removed from the calendar. Organisers of Rally Catalunya agreed to forfeit their place on the 2020 calendar as part of a rotation system that will see European events host rallies in two out of three calendar years. The Tour de Corse was removed in response to concerns from teams about the logistics of visiting Corsica, while Rally Australia was removed as the event's base in a regional centre rather than a major metropolitan area meant that the rally struggled to attract spectators. Rally Chile was included on the original calendar, but was later removed in the face of ongoing political unrest in the country. The FIA sought a replacement event to ensure that the calendar retained its planned fourteen rounds, but were unable to do so.

The Rallies in Italy were postponed as a result of the COVID-19 pandemic. Events in Argentina, Portugal, Kenya, Finland, New Zealand, Germany, Great Britain and Japan were cancelled. Organisers of the championship announced that they were considering adding events to the schedule that had not been part of the original calendar. Estonia, Belgium, Latvia, Croatia and Czech Republic were among the countries who had expressed interest hosting the event.

The running date of Rally Turkey was moved forward by a week, which facilitated the opportunity for additional rounds. Further calendar options included Ypres Rally and Croatia Rally. Following the cancellation of Rallye Deutschland, the running date of Rally Sardegna moved forward by three weeks. This decision was intended to avoid the clash with the 2020 Emilia Romagna Grand Prix of Formula One.

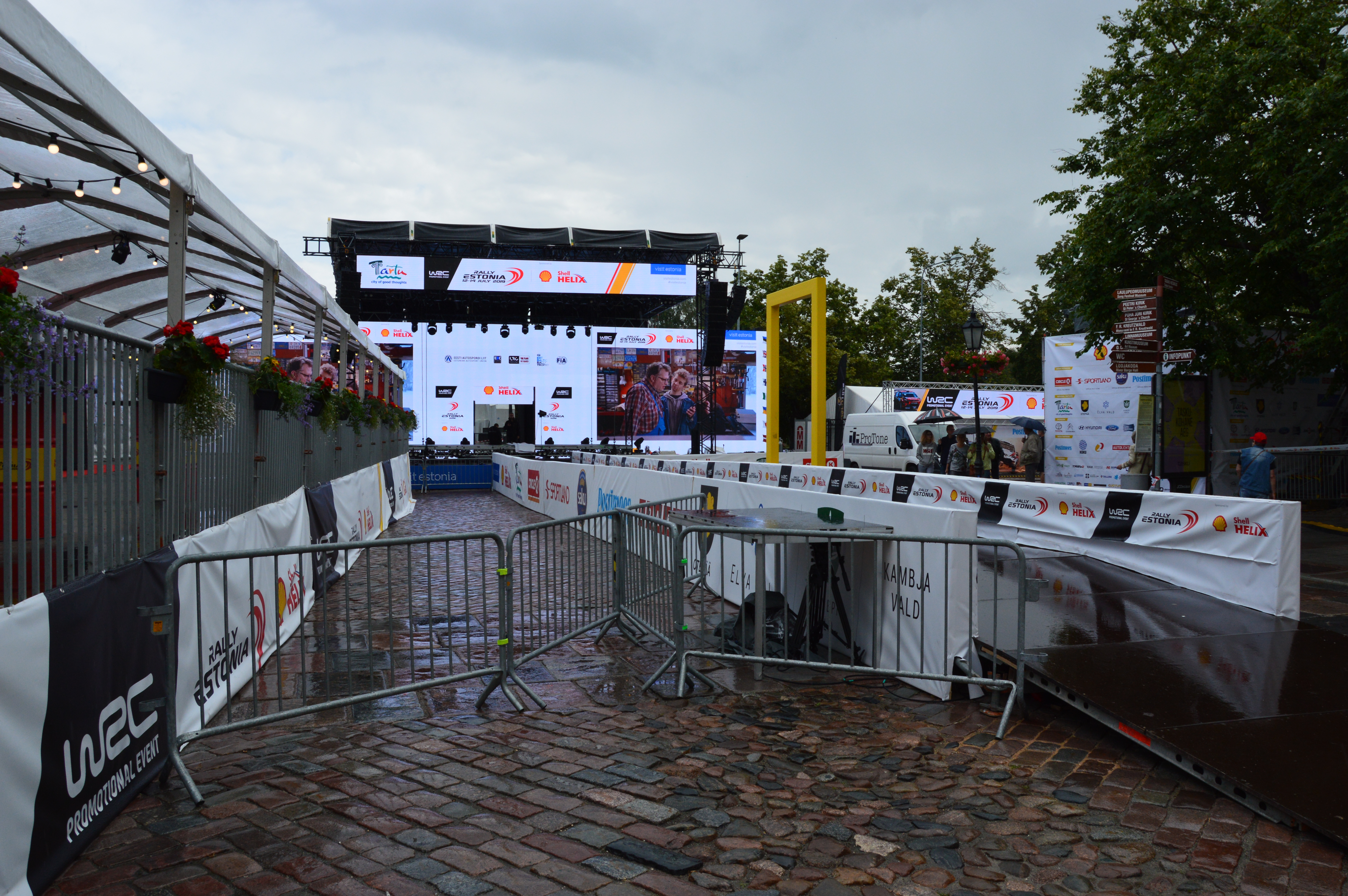
Estonia (Rally headquarter Tartu pictured) was the thirty-third country to host a World Rally Championship rally.

On 2 July 2020, it was announced that the season would return with an updated calendar. The season restarted with newcomers Rally Estonia hosting the resuming round between 4 and 6 September. The country became the thirty-third nation to stage a championship round in the WRC.

Following the cancellation of Rally Japan, it was announced that Ypres Rally, officially Renties Ypres Rally Belgium, would replace Rally Japan to hold the seventh round of the season. The Sunday's route would feature the iconic Circuit de Spa-Francorchamps in Stavelot, which would run with the 2020 World RX of Benelux of the World Rallycross Championship. Belgium was set to be the thirty-fourth country to hold a WRC event, but were unable to do so as the rally was eventually called off due to the COVID-19 pandemic.

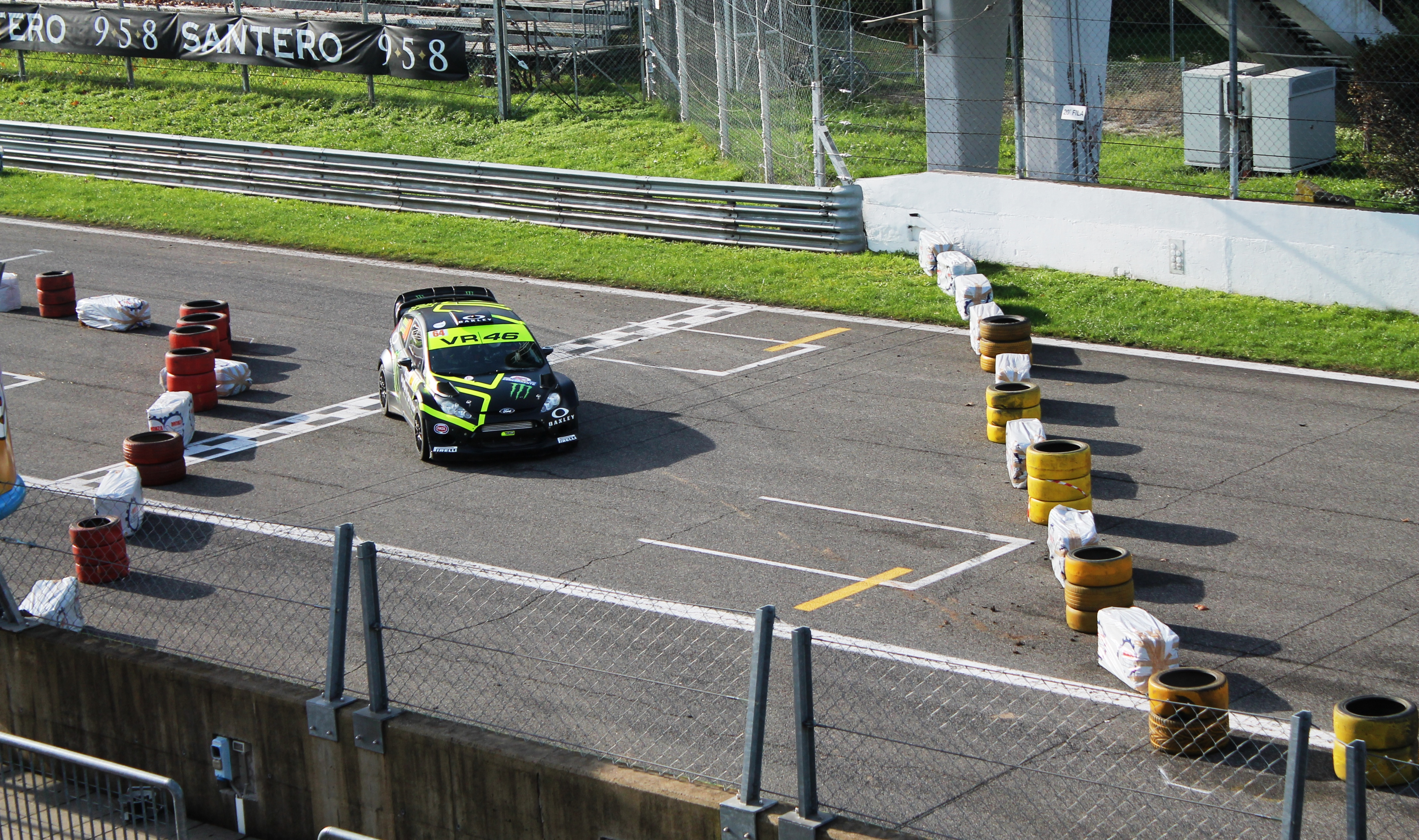
Calendar newcomer Rally Monza was the season's finale.

Rally Monza was announced to be the final round of the season on 9 October. This meant Italy staged two WRC events in one season as the country also stages the Sardinia rally. The rally was based in the famous Autodromo Nazionale di Monza circuit near Milan, where the Italian Grand Prix is held every year.

=== Route changes ===
Prior to the Rally Sweden, it was confirmed that the route for the rally had to be shortened due to a lack of snow. The route of Rally Mexico was shortened to allow teams time to pack up and return to their headquarters before several European nations imposed travel bans in a bid to manage the pandemic.

== Entries ==
The following teams and crews that entered in the 2020 WRC2:

Entrant	Car	Driver name	Co-driver name	Rounds
(France) PH-Sport	Citroën C3 R5	(Norway) Mads Østberg	(Norway) Torstein Eriksen	1–2, 4, 6–7
(South Korea) Hyundai Motorsport N	Hyundai i20 R5	(Russia) Nikolay Gryazin	(Russia) Yaroslav Fedorov	1–3
(South Korea) Hyundai Motorsport N	Hyundai i20 R5	(Russia) Nikolay Gryazin	(Russia) Konstantin Aleksandrov	4, 6
(South Korea) Hyundai Motorsport N	Hyundai i20 R5	(Norway) Ole Christian Veiby	(Sweden) Jonas Andersson	1–4, 6
(United Kingdom) M-Sport Ford WRT	Ford Fiesta R5 Mk. II	(France) Adrien Fourmaux	(Belgium) Renaud Jamoul	1–2, 4–7
(United Kingdom) M-Sport Ford WRT	Ford Fiesta R5 Mk. II	(United Kingdom) Rhys Yates	(United Kingdom) James Morgan	1–2
(Germany) Toksport WRT	Škoda Fabia R5 Evo	(Sweden) Pontus Tidemand	(Sweden) Patrik Barth	2–7
(Germany) Toksport WRT	Škoda Fabia R5 Evo	(Norway) Eyvind Brynildsen	(Austria) Ilka Minor	4–6
(Germany) Toksport WRT	Škoda Fabia R5 Evo	(Czech Republic) Jan Kopecký	(Czech Republic) Jan Hloušek	7

=== Summary ===
Citroën's factory team entered selected rounds of the 2019 championship, but did not compete in 2020 after the company withdrew from rallying. The Citroën C3 R5 remained available to independent teams. PH Sport ran one C3 R5 for Mads Østberg and Torstein Eriksen.

M-Sport Ford WRT committed two cars to the championship for crews led by Adrien Fourmaux and Rhys Yates. Gus Greensmith and co-driver Elliott Edmondson, who drove for the team in 2019, did not contest the championship as they joined the sport's premier class.

Hyundai Motorsport entered the championship under the name Hyundai Motorsport N. The team entered two Hyundai i20 R5s, one for Nikolay Gryazin and Yaroslav Fedorov, and the other for Ole Christian Veiby and Jonas Andersson.

Toksport WRT became the first independent team to join the championship. The team entered a Škoda Fabia R5 Evo for 2017 WRC2 Championship drivers' champion, Pontus Tidemand.

Škoda announced that they would not enter a works team, arguing that Škoda Motorsport had proven themselves as a team and that the company would instead turn to supporting independent teams and drivers in 2020. Similarly, Volkswagen did not enter a works team. The company cancelled all of its petrol-powered motorsport programmes to focus on electric racing, but would allow development of the Volkswagen Polo GTI R5 to continue.

== Changes ==
In 2019, the existing WRC2 championship was split into two championships for manufacturer teams and privateers. However, this structure was found to be too confusing, and so the category was re-structured for the 2020 season. Professional crews contested WRC2 and privateers in WRC3.

== Results and standings ==
=== Season summary ===
Round	Event	Winning driver	Winning co-driver	Winning entrant	Winning time	Report	Ref.
1	(Monaco) Rallye Automobile Monte Carlo	(Norway) Mads Østberg	(Norway) Torstein Eriksen	(France) PH-Sport	3:25:19.4	Report	
2	Rally Sweden	(Norway) Mads Østberg	(Norway) Torstein Eriksen	(France) PH-Sport	1:15:53.1	Report	
3	(Mexico) Rally Guanajuato México	(Sweden) Pontus Tidemand	(Sweden) Patrik Barth	(Germany) Toksport WRT	2:58:16.9	Report	
4	Rally Estonia	(Norway) Mads Østberg	(Norway) Torstein Eriksen	(France) PH-Sport	2:08:10.9	Report	
5	Marmaris Rally of Turkey	(Sweden) Pontus Tidemand	(Sweden) Patrik Barth	(Germany) Toksport WRT	2:56:02.4	Report	
6	(Italy) Rally Italia Sardegna	(Sweden) Pontus Tidemand	(Sweden) Patrik Barth	(Germany) Toksport WRT	2:51:58.4	Report	
7	(Italy) ACI Rally Monza	(Norway) Mads Østberg	(Norway) Torstein Eriksen	(France) PH-Sport	2:21:18.4	Report	

=== Scoring system ===
Points are awarded to the top ten classified finishers in each event. Unlike the World Rally Championship, extra points are not awarded for the Power Stage.

Position	1st	2nd	3rd	4th	5th	6th	7th	8th	9th	10th
Points	25	18	15	12	10	8	6	4	2	1

=== FIA WRC2 Championship for Drivers ===
(Results key)

Pos.	Driver	MON (Monaco)	SWE (Sweden)	MEX (Mexico)	EST (Estonia)	TUR (Turkey)	ITA (Italy)	MNZ (Italy)	Points
1	(Norway) Mads Østberg	1	1		1		4	1	112
2	(Sweden) Pontus Tidemand		3	1	3	1	1	2	108
3	(France) Adrien Fourmaux	2	4		2	2	Ret	4	78
4	(Norway) Ole Christian Veiby	Ret	2	3	Ret		2		51
5	(Russia) Nikolay Gryazin	3	6	2	5		Ret		51
6	(Norway) Eyvind Brynildsen				4	3	3		42
7	(United Kingdom) Rhys Yates	4	5						22
8	(Czech Republic) Jan Kopecký							3	15
Pos.	Driver	MON (Monaco)	SWE (Sweden)	MEX (Mexico)	EST (Estonia)	TUR (Turkey)	ITA (Italy)	MNZ (Italy)	Points

=== FIA WRC2 Championship for Co-Drivers ===
(Results key)

Pos.	Co-Driver	MON (Monaco)	SWE (Sweden)	MEX (Mexico)	EST (Estonia)	TUR (Turkey)	ITA (Italy)	MNZ (Italy)	Points
1	(Norway) Torstein Eriksen	1	1		1		4	1	112
2	(Sweden) Patrik Barth		3	1	3	1	1	2	108
3	(Belgium) Renaud Jamoul	2	4		2	2	Ret	4	78
4	(Sweden) Jonas Andersson	Ret	2	3	Ret		2		51
5	(Austria) Ilka Minor				4	3	3		42
6	(Russia) Yaroslav Fedorov	3	6	2					41
7	(United Kingdom) James Morgan	4	5						22
8	(Czech Republic) Jan Hloušek							3	15
9	(Russia) Konstantin Aleksandrov				5		Ret		10
Pos.	Co-Driver	MON (Monaco)	SWE (Sweden)	MEX (Mexico)	EST (Estonia)	TUR (Turkey)	ITA (Italy)	MNZ (Italy)	Points

=== FIA WRC2 Championship for Teams ===
(Results key)

Pos.	Team	MON (Monaco)	SWE (Sweden)	MEX (Mexico)	EST (Estonia)	TUR (Turkey)	ITA (Italy)	MNZ (Italy)	Points
1	(Germany) Toksport WRT		3	1	3	1	1		147
1	(Germany) Toksport WRT				4	3	3		147
2	(France) PH-Sport	1	1		1		4	1	112
3	(South Korea) Hyundai Motorsport N	3	2	2	5		2		102
3	(South Korea) Hyundai Motorsport N	Ret	6	3	Ret		Ret		102
4	(United Kingdom) M-Sport Ford WRT	2	4		2	2	Ret		88
4	(United Kingdom) M-Sport Ford WRT	4	5						88
Pos.	Team	MON (Monaco)	SWE (Sweden)	MEX (Mexico)	EST (Estonia)	TUR (Turkey)	ITA (Italy)	MNZ (Italy)	Points
