= 2020 WRC3 Championship =

2020 season of the FIA World Rally Championship-3

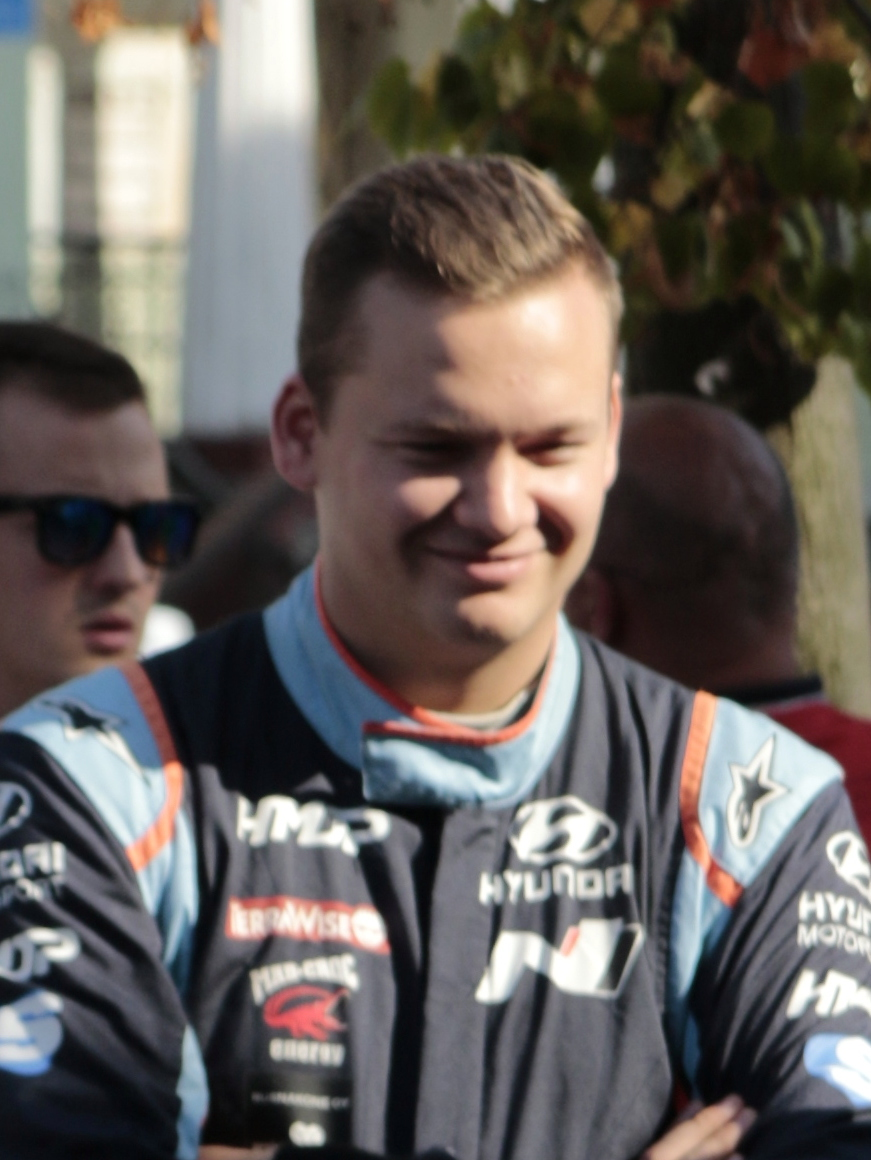
Jari Huttunen won the 2020 WRC3 category.

The 2020 FIA WRC3 Championship was the seventh season of WRC3, a rallying championship organised and governed by the Fédération Internationale de l'Automobile. It was open to privately-entered cars complying with Group Rally2 regulations.

No WRC3 championship took place in 2019, however eligibility in 2020 was similar to the 2019 WRC2 Championship for privateers, whereas the 2020 WRC2 Championship continued the team and manufacturer eligibility of 2019 WRC2 Pro Championship.

Jari Huttunen and Mikko Lukka won the 2020 WRC3 titles.

== Calendar ==
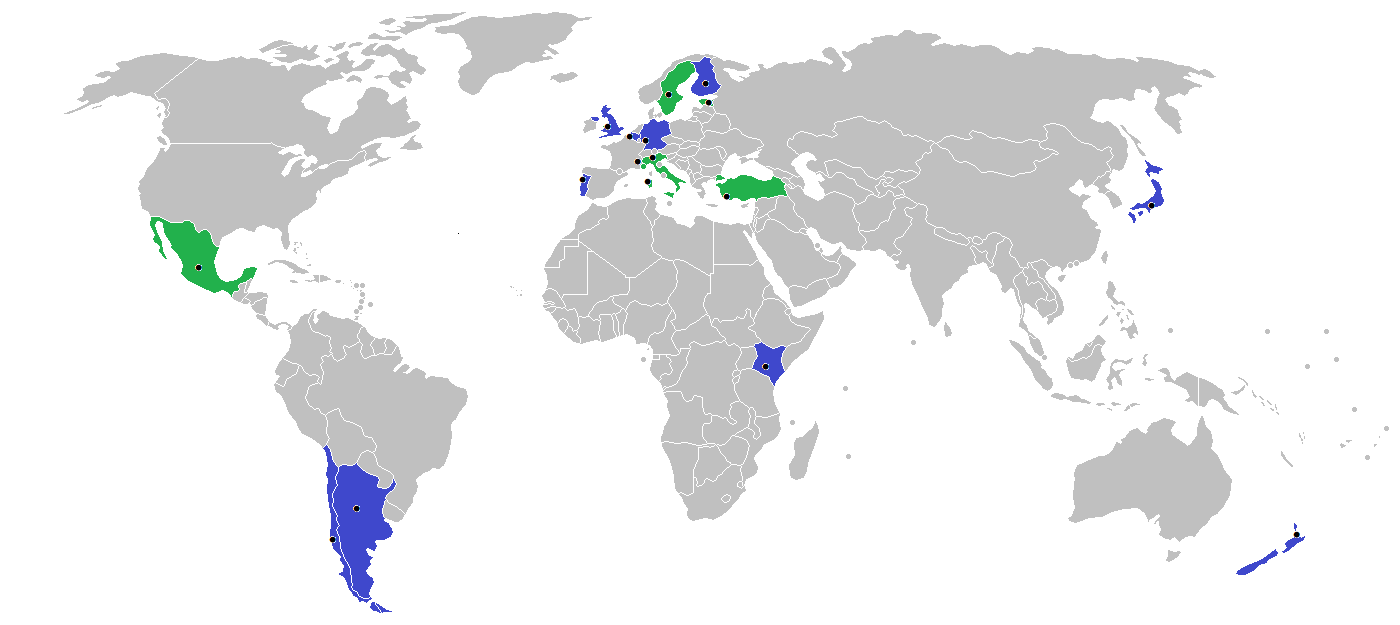
A map showing the locations of the rallies in the 2020 championship. Contested events are in green, while cancelled events are in blue. Event headquarters are marked with a black dot.

The 2020 championship was due to be contested over thirteen rounds in Europe, Africa, Asia, the Middle East, North and South America, and Oceania, but the calendar was reduced to seven rounds due to the COVID-19 pandemic.

Round	Start date	Finish date	Rally	Rally headquarters	Surface	Stages	Distance	Ref.
1	23 January	26 January	(Monaco) Rallye Automobile Monte Carlo	Gap, Provence-Alpes-Côte d'Azur (Note: The rally base of the Monte Carlo Rally was located in France.)	Mixed (Note: The Monte Carlo Rally is run on a tarmac and snow surface.)	16	304.28 km	
2	13 February	16 February	Rally Sweden	Torsby, Värmland	Snow	11	171.64 km (Note: The route of Rally Sweden was shortened from 301.26 km over 19 stages to 9 stages totalling 148.55 km. The route was shortened due to a lack of snow and bad weather conditions.)	
3	12 March	15 March	(Mexico) Rally Guanajuato México	León, Guanajuato	Gravel	21	268.84 km (Note: The route of Rally Mexico was shortened by 56.01 km.)	
4	4 September	6 September	Rally Estonia	Tartu, Tartu County	Gravel	17	232.64 km	
5	18 September	20 September	Rally of Turkey	Marmaris, Muğla	Gravel	12	223.00 km	
6	8 October	11 October	(Italy) Rally Italia Sardegna	Alghero, Sardinia	Gravel	16	238.84 km	
7	3 December	6 December	(Italy) ACI Rally Monza	Monza, Lombardy	Tarmac	16	239.20 km	

The following rounds were included on the original calendar published by WRC Promoter GmbH, but were later cancelled:

Start date	Finish date	Rally	Rally headquarters	Surface	Stages	Distance	Cancellation reason	Ref.
16 April	19 April	Rally Chile	Concepción, Biobío	Gravel	—N/a	—N/a	Political unrest	
23 April (Note: The running dates of Rally Argentina were initially scheduled to be 30 April to 3 May.)	26 April	Rally Argentina	Villa Carlos Paz, Córdoba	Gravel	16	322.36 km	COVID-19 pandemic	
21 May	24 May	Rally de Portugal	Matosinhos, Porto	Gravel	22	331.10 km	COVID-19 pandemic	
16 July	19 July	Safari Rally Kenya	Nairobi	Gravel	18	315.12 km	COVID-19 pandemic	
6 August	9 August	Rally Finland	Jyväskylä, Central Finland	Gravel	24	321.87 km	COVID-19 pandemic	
3 September	6 September	Rally New Zealand	Auckland, Te Ika-a-Māui	Gravel	—N/a	—N/a	COVID-19 pandemic	
15 October	18 October	(Germany) ADAC Rallye Deutschland	Bostalsee, Saarland	Tarmac	—N/a	—N/a	COVID-19 pandemic	
29 October	1 November	(United Kingdom) Wales Rally GB	Llandudno, Conwy	Gravel	—N/a	—N/a	COVID-19 pandemic	
19 November	22 November	Rally Japan	Nagoya, Chūbu	Tarmac	19	307.78 km	COVID-19 pandemic	
20 November	22 November	Renties Ypres Rally Belgium	Ypres, West Flanders	Tarmac	23	265.69 km	COVID-19 pandemic	

=== Calendar changes ===
With the addition of Rally Chile to the calendar in 2019, the FIA opened the tender process for new events to join the championship in 2020. Bids to revive Rally Japan and the Safari Rally were received, and candidate events were run in 2019. Both events were accepted to the 2020 calendar, as was a proposal to revive Rally New Zealand. However, none of the aforementioned events were run due to the COVID-19 pandemic.

- The Safari Rally was scheduled to be run as a World Championship event for the first time since 2002. The event was to be based in the Kenyan capital Nairobi and feature stages around Lake Naivasha. In contrast to the event's traditional endurance format, which featured stages hundreds of kilometres long, the 2020 Safari Rally was planned to follow a compact route to comply with FIA regulations mandating the maximum route distance.
- Rally Japan was scheduled to return to the calendar for the first time since 2010, replacing Rally Australia as the final round of the championship. The rally was scheduled to move away from its original headquarters in Hokkaidō to a new base in Nagoya and was to be run on tarmac rather than gravel.
- Rally New Zealand was scheduled to return to the calendar for the first time since 2012. The event was planned to return to Auckland.

The addition of these events saw the Tour de Corse and the Rallies of Catalunya and Australia removed from the calendar. Organisers of Rally Catalunya agreed to forfeit their place on the 2020 calendar as part of a rotation system that will see European events host rallies in two out of three calendar years. The Tour de Corse was removed in response to concerns from teams about the logistics of visiting Corsica, while Rally Australia was removed as the event's base in a regional centre rather than a major metropolitan area meant that the rally struggled to attract spectators. Rally Chile was included on the original calendar, but was later removed in the face of ongoing political unrest in the country. The FIA sought a replacement event to ensure that the calendar retained its planned fourteen rounds, but were unable to do so.

The Rallies in Italy were postponed as a result of the COVID-19 pandemic. Events in Argentina, Portugal, Kenya, Finland, New Zealand, Germany, Great Britain and Japan were cancelled. Organisers of the championship announced that they were considering adding events to the schedule that had not been part of the original calendar. Estonia, Belgium, Latvia, Croatia and Czech Republic were among the countries who had expressed interest hosting the event.

The running date of Rally Turkey was moved forward by a week, which facilitated the opportunity for additional rounds. Further calendar options included Ypres Rally and Croatia Rally. Following the cancellation of Rallye Deutschland, the running date of Rally Sardegna moved forward by three weeks. This decision was intended to avoid the clash with the 2020 Emilia Romagna Grand Prix of Formula One.

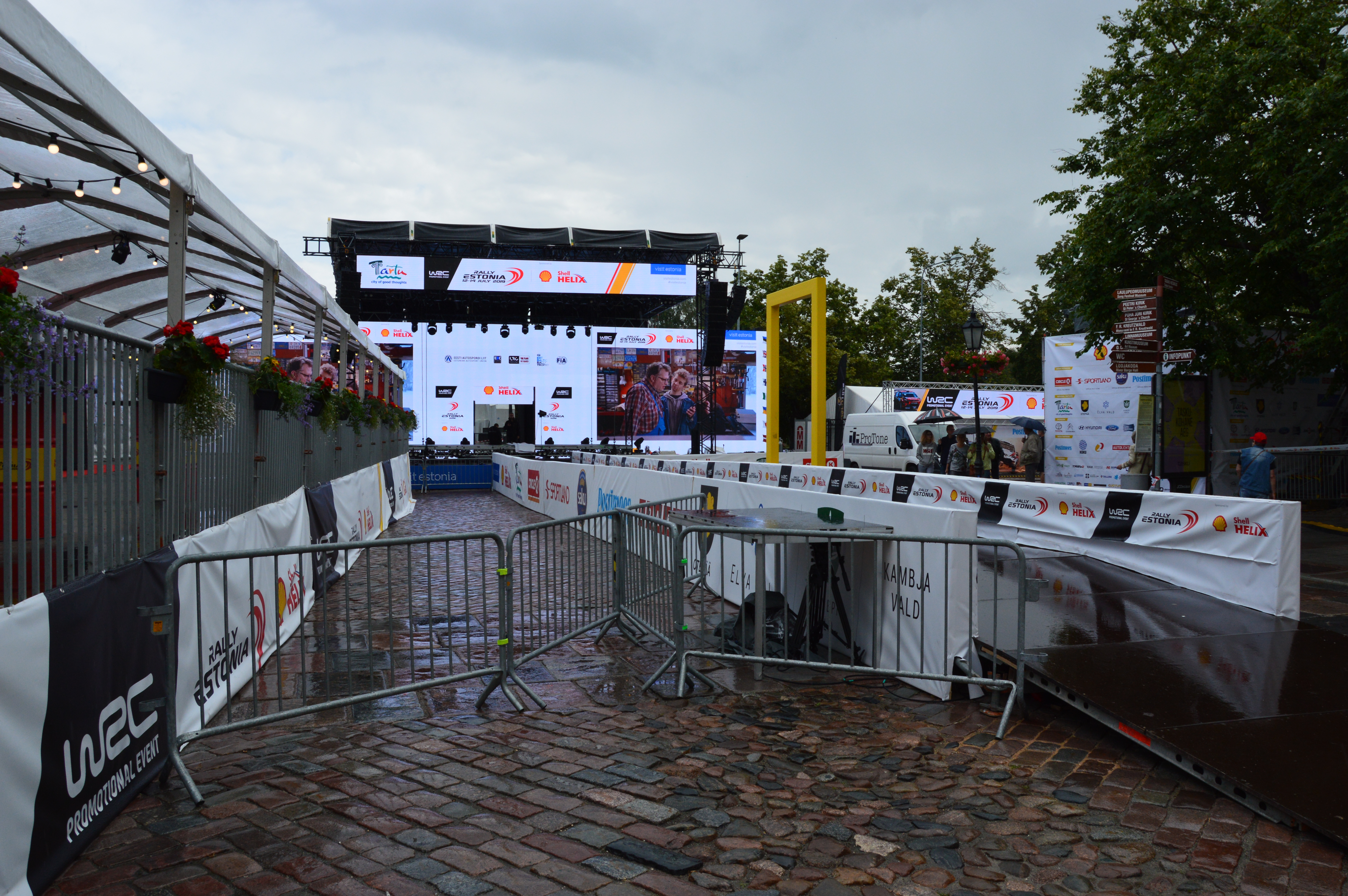
Estonia (Rally headquarter Tartu pictured) was the thirty-third country to host a World Rally Championship rally.

On 2 July 2020, it was announced that the season would return with an updated calendar. The season restarted with newcomers Rally Estonia hosting the resuming round between 4 and 6 September. The country became the thirty-third nation to stage a championship round in the WRC.

Following the cancellation of Rally Japan, it was announced that Ypres Rally, officially Renties Ypres Rally Belgium, would replace Rally Japan to hold the seventh round of the season. The Sunday's route would feature the iconic Circuit de Spa-Francorchamps in Stavelot, which would run with the 2020 World RX of Benelux of the World Rallycross Championship. Belgium was set to be the thirty-fourth country to hold a WRC event, but were unable to do so as the rally was eventually called off due to the COVID-19 pandemic.

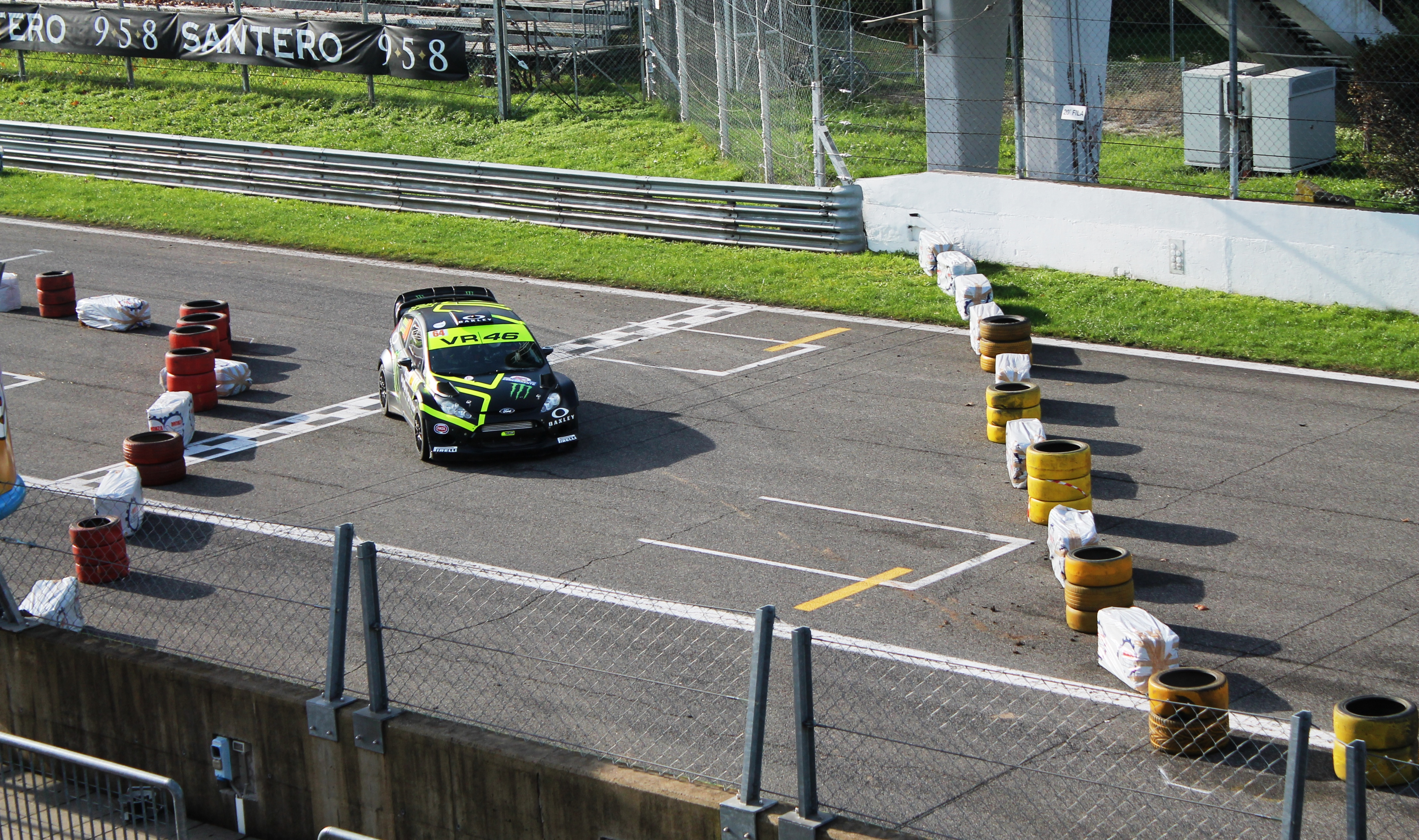
Calendar newcomer Rally Monza was the season's finale.

Rally Monza was announced to be the final round of the season on 9 October. This meant Italy staged two WRC events in one season as the country also stages the Sardinia rally. The rally was based in the famous Autodromo Nazionale di Monza circuit near Milan, where the Italian Grand Prix is held every year.

=== Route changes ===
Prior to the Rally Sweden, it was confirmed that the route for the rally had to be shortened due to a lack of snow. The route of Rally Mexico was shortened to allow teams time to pack up and return to their headquarters before several European nations imposed travel bans in a bid to manage the pandemic.

== Entries ==
The following crews compete in the 2020 WRC3:

Entrant	Driver name (Note: Under the Sporting Regulations, each car is entered under the driver's name.)	Co-driver name	Car	Rounds
(Italy) Motorsport Italia	(Brazil) Paulo Nobre	(Brazil) Gabriel Morales	Škoda Fabia R5	1–3, 5
(Italy) Motorsport Italia	(Portugal) Diogo Salvi	(Portugal) Hugo Magalhães	Škoda Fabia R5	5
(France) CHL Sport Auto	(France) Yoann Bonato	(France) Benjamin Boulloud	Citroën C3 R5	1
(France) Saintéloc Junior Team	(France) Eric Camilli	(France) François-Xavier Buresi	Citroën C3 R5	1, 6
(France) Saintéloc Junior Team	(United States) Sean Johnston	(United States) Alex Kihurani	Citroën C3 R5	4–6
(Belgium) DG Sport Compétition	(France) Nicolas Ciamin	(France) Yannick Roche	Citroën C3 R5	1, 4, 6
(Belgium) DG Sport Compétition	(Spain) Pepe Lopéz	(Spain) Borja Rozada	Citroën C3 R5	1
(United Kingdom) M-Sport Ford World Rally Team	(Italy) "Pedro"	(Italy) Emmanuele Baldaccini	Ford Fiesta R5 Mk. II	1, 5–6
(United Kingdom) M-Sport Ford World Rally Team	(Chile) Alberto Heller	(Argentina) José Díaz	Ford Fiesta R5 Mk. II	3
(United Kingdom) M-Sport Ford World Rally Team	(Chile) Alberto Heller	(Spain) Marc Martí	Ford Fiesta R5 Mk. II	5–6
(United Kingdom) M-Sport Ford World Rally Team	(Spain) Jan Solans	(Spain) Mauro Barreiro	Ford Fiesta R5 Mk. II	4–6
(Belgium) BMA Autosport	(Luxembourg) Grégoire Munster	(Belgium) Louis Louka	Škoda Fabia R5	1
(South Korea) Hyundai Motorsport N	(Luxembourg) Grégoire Munster	(Belgium) Louis Louka	Hyundai i20 R5	2, 4, 7
(South Korea) Hyundai Motorsport N	(Finland) Jari Huttunen	(Finland) Mikko Lukka	Hyundai i20 R5	2, 4, 6–7
(France) PH Sport	(France) Yohan Rossel	(France) Benoît Fulcrand	Citroën C3 R5	1, 4, 6–7
(France) Sarrazin Motorsport	(France) Stéphane Sarrazin	(France) Kévin Parent	Hyundai i20 R5	1
(Italy) Hyundai Rally Team Italia	(Italy) Umberto Scandola	(Italy) Guido D'Amore	Hyundai i20 R5	1–2, 6–7
(Italy) Bernini Rally	(Italy) Andrea Nucita	(Italy) Bernardo Di Caro	Hyundai i20 R5	1
(Spain) Calm Compéticio	(Spain) Miguel Díaz-Aboitiz	(Spain) Diego Sanjuan	Škoda Fabia R5	1–2
(Italy) PA Racing	(Italy) Enrico Brazzoli	(Italy) Maurizio Barone	Škoda Fabia R5	1, 7
(Sweden) Kristoffersson Motorsport	(Sweden) Johan Kristoffersson	(Norway) Stig Rune Skjærmoen	Volkswagen Polo GTI R5	2
(Finland) TGS Worldwide	(Estonia) Rainer Aus	(Estonia) Simo Koskinen	Škoda Fabia R5	4
(Finland) TGS Worldwide	(Finland) Eerik Pietarinen	(Finland) Antti Linnaketo	Škoda Fabia R5	4
(Finland) TGS Worldwide	(Finland) Eerik Pietarinen	(Finland) Miikka Anttila	Škoda Fabia R5 Evo	2
(Finland) TGS Worldwide	(Finland) Emil Lindholm	(Finland) Mikael Korhonen	Škoda Fabia R5 Evo	2
Eurosol Racing Team Hungary	(Finland) Emil Lindholm	(Finland) Mikael Korhonen	Škoda Fabia R5 Evo	7
Eurosol Racing Team Hungary	(Norway) Andreas Mikkelsen	(Norway) Anders Jæger	Škoda Fabia R5 Evo	7
(Czech Republic) Škoda Motorsport	(Sweden) Oliver Solberg	(Republic of Ireland) Aaron Johnston	Škoda Fabia R5 Evo	2, 6–7
(Sweden) PSRX	(Sweden) Oliver Solberg	(Republic of Ireland) Aaron Johnston	Volkswagen Polo GTI R5	3–4
(Latvia) Sports Racing Technologies	(Estonia) Raul Jeets	(Estonia) Andrus Toom	Škoda Fabia R5 Evo	2, 4
(Estonia) Red Grey Team	(Estonia) Roland Poom	(Estonia) Ken Järveoja	Ford Fiesta R5	2
(Estonia) Red Grey Team	(Estonia) Roland Poom	(Estonia) Erik Lepikson	Ford Fiesta R5 Mk. II	4
(Estonia) Red Grey Team	(Russia) Radik Shaymiev	(Russia) Alexey Arnautov	Ford Fiesta R5 Mk. II	4
(Estonia) Red Grey Team	(Russia) Radik Shaymiev	(Russia) Maxim Tsvetkov	Ford Fiesta R5	3
(Czech Republic) Kresta Racing	(Czech Republic) Filip Mareš	(Czech Republic) Jan Hloušek	Škoda Fabia R5 Evo	2
(Poland) Barlinek Synthos Rally Team	(Poland) Michał Sołowow	(Poland) Maciek Baran	Škoda Fabia R5	2
(Belgium) SXM Compétition	(Sweden) Joakim Roman	(Sweden) Alexander Glavsjö	Škoda Fabia R5	2
(Italy) Delta Rally	(Italy) Giacomo Costenaro	(Italy) Justin Bardini	Škoda Fabia R5	2
(Italy) Delta Rally	(Italy) Alberto Battistolli	(Italy) Fabrizia Pons	Škoda Fabia R5	2
(Italy) Delta Rally	(Italy) Alberto Battistolli	(Italy) Simone Scattolin	Škoda Fabia R5 Evo	6
(Poland) Lotos Rally Team	(Poland) Kajetan Kajetanowicz	(Poland) Maciek Szczepaniak	Škoda Fabia R5 Evo	3–7
(Spain) Race Seven	(Mexico) Benito Guerra	(Spain) Daniel Cué	Škoda Fabia R5	3
Citroën Rally Team Hungary	(Bolivia) Marco Bulacia	(Italy) Giovanni Bernacchini	Citroën C3 R5	3
Citroën Rally Team Hungary	(Bolivia) Marco Bulacia	(Argentina) Marcelo Der Ohannesian	Citroën C3 R5	4–7
Citroën Rally Team Hungary	(Turkey) Yağiz Avci	(Turkey) Onur Vatansever	Citroën C3 R5	5
(Mexico) Triviño Rally Team	(Mexico) Ricardo Triviño	(Spain) Marc Martí	Škoda Fabia R5	3
(Italy) GB Motors	(Italy) Gianluca Linari	(Italy) Nicola Arena	Ford Fiesta R5	3
(Germany) Toksport World Rally Team	(Chile) Emilio Fernández	(Argentina) Rubén García	Škoda Fabia R5 Evo	3–6
(Republic of Ireland) McKenna Motorsport	(Republic of Ireland) Barry McKenna	(Republic of Ireland) James Fulton	Škoda Fabia R5	3
(Finland) Printsport	(Estonia) Karl Kruuda	(Australia) Dale Moscatt	Volkswagen Polo GTI R5	4
(Finland) Printsport	(Saudi Arabia) Rakan Al-Rashed	(Portugal) Hugo Magalhães	Volkswagen Polo GTI R5	4
(Estonia) Kaur Motorsport	(Estonia) Egon Kaur	(Estonia) Silver Simm	Škoda Fabia R5 Evo	4
(Estonia) OT Racing	(Estonia) Priit Koik	(Estonia) Uku Heldna	Ford Fiesta R5	4
(Estonia) ALM Motorsport	(Estonia) Georg Linnamäe	(Ukraine) Volodymyr Korsia	Volkswagen Polo GTI R5	4
(Estonia) ALM Motorsport	(Estonia) Gustav Kruuda	(Estonia) Ken Järveoja	Volkswagen Polo GTI R5	4
(Poland) Plon Rally Team	(Poland) Jarosław Koltun	(Poland) Ireneusz Pleskot	Ford Fiesta R5 Mk. II	4
(Turkey) BC Vision Motorsport	(Turkey) Burak Çukurova	(Turkey) Burak Akcay	Škoda Fabia R5	5
(Turkey) Neo Motorspor	(Turkey) Uğur Soylu	(Turkey) Mehmet Köleoğlu	Škoda Fabia R5	5
(Italy) Free Rally Service	(Italy) Luciano Cobbe	(Italy) Fabio Turco	Škoda Fabia R5 Evo	6
(Italy) Metior Sport	(Belgium) Cédric De Cecco	(Belgium) Jérôme Humblet	Škoda Fabia R5 Evo	7
(Republic of Ireland) Motorsport Ireland Rally Academy	(Republic of Ireland) Josh McErlean	(United Kingdom) Keaton Williams	Hyundai i20 R5	7
(Italy) G. Car Sport Racing	(Italy) Giacomo Ogliari	(Italy) Giacomo Ciucci	Citroën C3 R5	7

== Changes ==
In 2019, the championship was run as the WRC2, while the category known as the WRC2 Pro was for professional crews entered by manufacturer teams. However, the multi-class structure was found to be too confusing, and so the category was re-structured for the 2020 season. Professional crews contested the WRC2 and privateers contested WRC3.

== Results and standings ==
=== Season summary ===
Round	Event	Winning driver	Winning co-driver	Winning entrant	Winning time	Report	Ref.
1	(Monaco) Rallye Automobile Monte Carlo	(France) Eric Camilli	(France) François-Xavier Buresi	(France) Saintéloc Junior Team	3:24:39.8	Report	
2	Rally Sweden	(Finland) Jari Huttunen	(Finland) Mikko Lukka	(South Korea) Hyundai Motorsport N	1:15:46.1	Report	
3	(Mexico) Rally Guanajuato México	(Bolivia) Marco Bulacia	(Italy) Giovanni Bernacchini	Citroën Rally Team Hungary	3:01:25.1	Report	
4	Rally Estonia	(Sweden) Oliver Solberg	(Republic of Ireland) Aaron Johnston	(Sweden) PSRX	2:07:32.2	Report	
5	Marmaris Rally of Turkey	(Poland) Kajetan Kajetanowicz	(Poland) Maciek Szczepaniak	(Poland) Lotos Rally Team	2:55:38.2	Report	
6	(Italy) Rally Italia Sardegna	(Finland) Jari Huttunen	(Finland) Mikko Lukka	(South Korea) Hyundai Motorsport N	2:50:19.2	Report	
7	(Italy) ACI Rally Monza	(Norway) Andreas Mikkelsen	(Norway) Anders Jæger	Eurosol Racing Team Hungary	2:19:47.2	Report	

=== Scoring system ===
Points were awarded to the top ten classified finishers in each event. Unlike the World Rally Championship, points are not awarded for the Power Stage.

Position	1st	2nd	3rd	4th	5th	6th	7th	8th	9th	10th
Points	25	18	15	12	10	8	6	4	2	1

=== FIA WRC3 Championship for Drivers ===
(Results key)

Pos.	Driver	MON (Monaco)	SWE (Sweden)	MEX (Mexico)	EST (Estonia)	TUR (Turkey)	ITA (Italy)	MNZ (Italy)	Points
1	(Finland) Jari Huttunen		1		2		1	3	83
2	(Bolivia) Marco Bulacia			1	4	2	3	6	70
3	(Poland) Kajetan Kajetanowicz			4	Ret	1	2	5	65
4	(Sweden) Oliver Solberg		5	Ret	1		6	2	61
5	(Finland) Emil Lindholm		2					4	30
6	(France) Nicolas Ciamin	2			6		9		28
7	(Norway) Andreas Mikkelsen							1	25
8	(France) Eric Camilli	1					Ret		25
9	(Chile) Emilio Fernández			2	Ret	7	10		25
10	(Chile) Alberto Heller			Ret		4	5		22
11	(Italy) Umberto Scandola	8	WD				4	Ret	16
12	(France) Yoann Bonato	3							15
13	(Sweden) Johan Kristoffersson		3						15
14	(Mexico) Ricardo Triviño			3					15
15	(Estonia) Egon Kaur				3				15
16	(Turkey) Yağiz Avci					3			15
17	(France) Yohan Rossel	4			9		11	10	15
18	(Finland) Eerik Pietarinen		4		16				12
19	(Mexico) Benito Guerra			5					10
20	(Estonia) Karl Kruuda				5				10
21	(Turkey) Burak Cukurova					5			10
22	(Luxembourg) Grégoire Munster	5	WD		11			Ret	10
23	(Czech Republic) Filip Mareš		6						8
24	(Spain) Jan Solans				12	6	Ret		8
25	(Italy) Enrico Brazzoli	6						11	8
26	(Republic of Ireland) Josh McErlean							7	6
27	(Spain) Miguel Díaz-Aboitiz	7	WD						6
28	(Estonia) Raul Jeets		7		Ret				6
29	(Estonia) Rainer Aus				7				6
30	(Italy) Alberto Battistolli						7		6
31	(Belgium) Cédric De Cecco							8	4
32	(Italy) "Pedro"	Ret				8	Ret		4
33	(Poland) Michał Sołowow		8						4
34	(United States) Sean Johnston				8	Ret	Ret		4
35	(Italy) Luciano Cobbe						8		4
36	(Italy) Giacomo Ogliari							9	2
37	(Brazil) Paulo Nobre	9	WD	WD		WD	WD		2
38	(Sweden) Joakim Roman		9						2
39	(Estonia) Priit Koik				10				1
Pos.	Driver	MON (Monaco)	SWE (Sweden)	MEX (Mexico)	EST (Estonia)	TUR (Turkey)	ITA (Italy)	MNZ (Italy)	Points

=== FIA WRC3 Championship for Co-Drivers ===
(Results key)

Pos.	Co-Driver	MON (Monaco)	SWE (Sweden)	MEX (Mexico)	EST (Estonia)	TUR (Turkey)	ITA (Italy)	MNZ (Italy)	Points
1	(Finland) Mikko Lukka		1		2		1	3	83
2	(Poland) Maciek Szczepaniak			4	Ret	1	2	5	65
3	(Republic of Ireland) Aaron Johnston		5	Ret	1		6	2	61
4	(Argentina) Marcelo Der Ohannesian				4	2	3	6	53
5	(Spain) Marc Martí			3		4	5		37
6	(Finland) Mikael Korhonen		2					4	30
7	(France) Yannick Roche	2			6		9		28
8	(France) François-Xavier Buresi	1					Ret		25
9	(Italy) Giovanni Bernacchini			1					25
10	(Norway) Anders Jæger							1	25
11	(Argentina) Rubén García			2	Ret	7	10		25
12	(Italy) Guido D'Amore	8	WD				4	Ret	16
13	(France) Benjamin Boulloud	3							15
14	(Norway) Stig Rune Skjærmoen		3						15
15	(Estonia) Silver Simm				3				15
16	(Turkey) Onur Vatansever					3			15
17	(France) Benoît Fulcrand	4			9		11	10	15
18	(Finland) Miikka Anttila		4						12
19	(Belgium) Louis Louka	5	WD		11			Ret	10
20	(Spain) Daniel Cué			5					10
21	(Australia) Dale Moscatt				5				10
22	(Turkey) Burak Akcay					5			10
23	(Italy) Maurizio Barone	6						11	8
24	(Czech Republic) Jan Hloušek		6						8
25	(Spain) Mauro Barreiro				12	6	Ret		8
26	(Spain) Diego Sanjuan	7	WD						6
27	(Estonia) Andrus Toom		7		Ret				6
28	(Estonia) Simo Koskinen				7				6
29	(Italy) Simone Scattolin						6		8
30	(United Kingdom) Keaton Williams							7	6
31	(Italy) Emmanuele Baldaccini	Ret				8	Ret		4
32	(Poland) Maciek Baran		8						4
33	(United States) Alex Kihurani				8	Ret	Ret		4
34	(Italy) Fabio Turco						8		4
35	(Belgium) Jérôme Humblet							8	4
36	(Brazil) Gabriel Morales	9	WD	WD		WD			2
37	(Sweden) Alexander Glavsjö		9						2
38	(Italy) Giacomo Ciucci							9	2
39	(Estonia) Uku Heldna				10				1
Pos.	Co-Driver	MON (Monaco)	SWE (Sweden)	MEX (Mexico)	EST (Estonia)	TUR (Turkey)	ITA (Italy)	MNZ (Italy)	Points
