= 2020 Rally Finland =

Motor rally competition

2020 Rally Finland: 70. Neste Rally Finland
- Part of the 2020 World Rally Championship
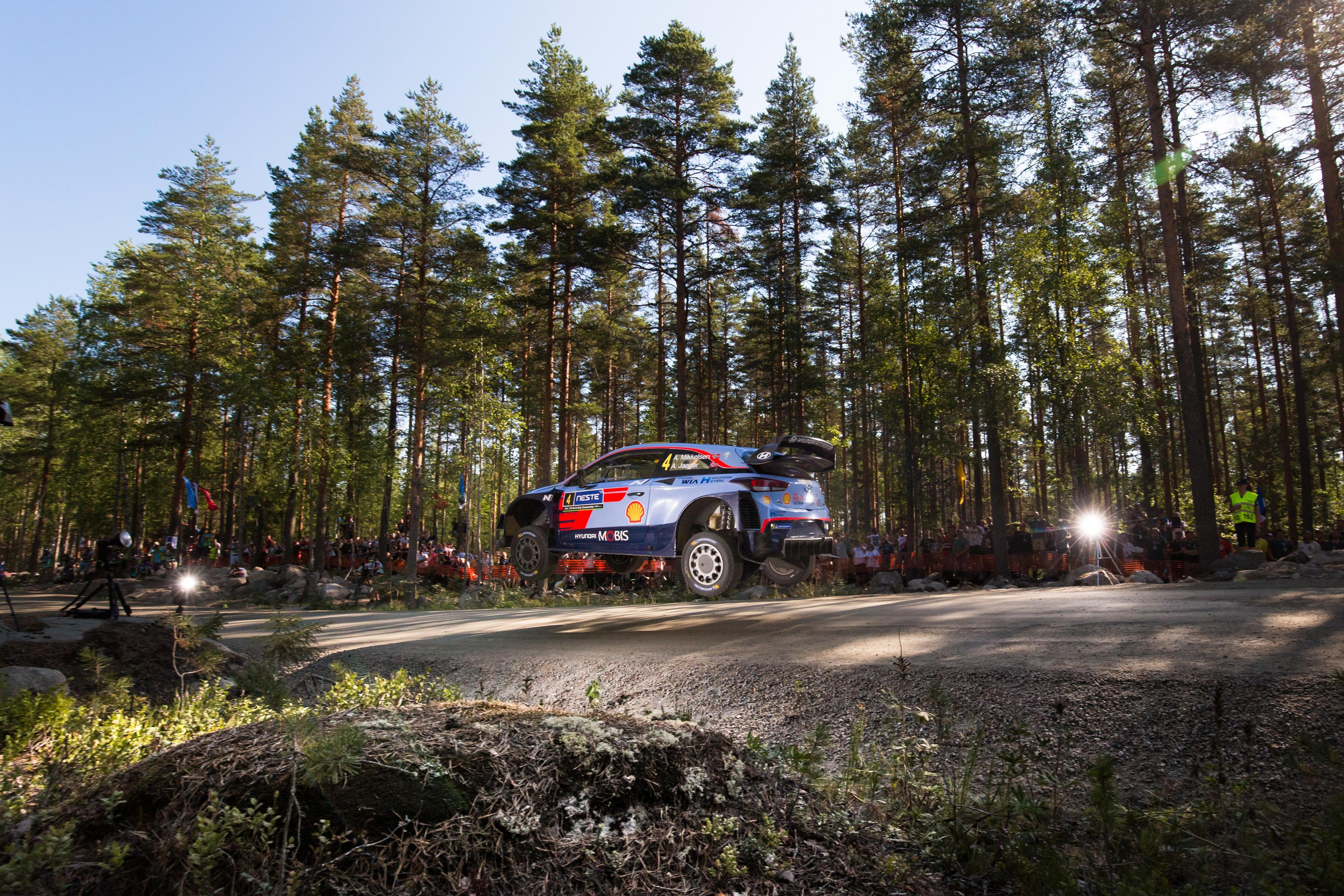
- Rally Finland was the third event called off due to the COVID-19 pandemic in 2020.
- Host country: Finland
- Rally base: Jyväskylä, Keski-Suomi
- Held on: Scheduled for 6–9 August 2020
- Start location: Jyväskylä, Keski-Suomi
- Finish location: Jyväskylä, Keski-Suomi
- Stages: 24 (321.87 km; 200.00 miles)
- Stage surface: Gravel

Statistics
- Cancellation: Rally cancelled due to COVID-19 pandemic.

The 2020 Rally Finland (also known as the Neste Rally Finland 2020) was a motor racing event for rally cars that was scheduled to be held over four days between 6 and 9 August 2020, but was cancelled due to the COVID-19 pandemic. It was set to mark the seventieth running of Rally Finland and planned to be the eighth round of the 2020 World Rally Championship, World Rally Championship-2 and World Rally Championship-3. It was also planned to run as the third round of the 2020 Junior World Rally Championship. The 2020 event was scheduled to be based in Jyväskylä in Keski-Suomi and consisted of twenty-four special stages covering a total competitive distance of 321.87 km (200.00 mi).

Ott Tänak and Martin Järveoja were the defending rally winners. The team they drove for in 2019, Toyota Gazoo Racing WRT, were the defending manufacturers' winners. Kalle Rovanperä and Jonne Halttunen were the defending winners in the World Rally Championship-2 category, (Note: The championship was known as the World Rally Championship-2 Pro in 2019.) but they would not defend their titles as they were promoted to the higher class. In the World Rally Championship-3 category, Nikolay Gryazin and Yaroslav Fedorov were the reigning rally winners, but they would not defend their titles either as they were promoted to WRC-2 class. (Note: The championship was known as the World Rally Championship-2 in 2019.) Tom Kristensson and Henrik Appelskog were the reigning rally winners in the Junior World Rally Championship.

== Background ==
=== Route ===
==== Itinerary ====
All dates and times are EEST (UTC+3).

Date	Time	No.	Stage name	Distance
—N/a	09:01	—	Vesala [Shakedown]	4.04 km
Leg 1 — 131.42 km
—N/a	19:00	SS1	Harju 1	2.31 km
—N/a	8:08	SS2	Laukaa 1	11.75 km
—N/a	9:08	SS3	Ruuhimäki 1	11.12 km
—N/a	10:08	SS4	Laukaa 2	11.75 km
—N/a	11:08	SS5	Ruuhimäki 2	11.12 km
—N/a	13:46	SS6	Humalamäki 1	5.85 km
—N/a	14:39	SS7	Ässämäki 1	12.28 km
—N/a	15:42	SS8	Sahloinen — Moksi 1	22.40 km
—N/a	16:48	SS9	Humalamäki 2	5.85 km
—N/a	17:41	SS10	Ässämäki 2	12.28 km
—N/a	18:44	SS11	Sahloinen — Moksi 2	22.40 km
—N/a	20:00	SS12	Harju 2	2.31 km
Leg 2 — 143.09 km
—N/a	8:08	SS13	Pihlajakoski 1	14.42 km
—N/a	9:11	SS14	Päijälä 1	22.87 km
—N/a	10:08	SS15	Kakaristo 1	18.70 km
—N/a	10:52	SS16	Arvaja 1	13.46 km
—N/a	14:43	SS17	Pihlajakoski 2	14.42 km
—N/a	15:46	SS18	Päijälä 2	22.87 km
—N/a	16:46	SS19	Kakaristo 2	18.70 km
—N/a	17:24	SS20	Arvaja 2	13.46 km
—N/a	19:08	SS21	Laajavuori 1	4.19 km
Leg 3 — 47.36 km
—N/a	9:08	SS22	Oittila 1	19.34 km
—N/a	11:21	SS23	Oittila 2	19.34 km
—N/a	13:18	SS24	Laajavuori 2 [Power Stage]	8.68 km

== Notes ==
Previous rally: N/A	2020 FIA World Rally Championship	Next rally: N/A
Previous rally: 2019 Rally Finland	2020 Rally Finland	Next rally: 2021 Rally Finland
