= 2020 Rallye Deutschland =

2020 edition of Rallye Deutschland

2020 Rallye Deutschland: 38. ADAC Rallye Deutschland
- Part of the 2020 World Rally Championship
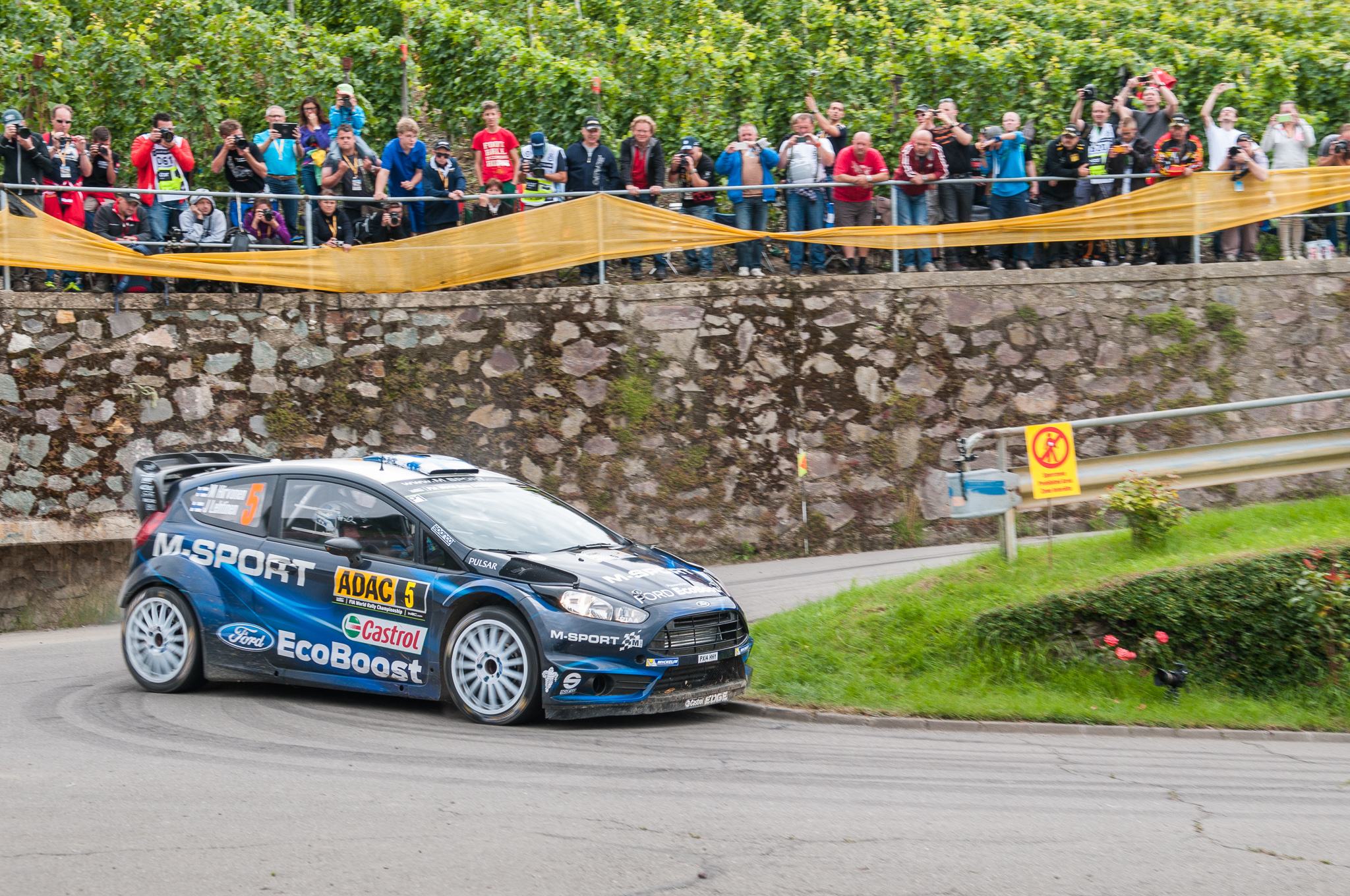
- The rally was the eighth event of the season cancelled due to the COVID-19 pandemic.
- Host country: Germany
- Rally base: Bostalsee, Saarland
- Held on: Scheduled for 15–18 October 2020
- Stage surface: Tarmac

Statistics
- Cancellation: Rally cancelled due to COVID-19 pandemic.

The 2020 Rallye Deutschland (also known as the ADAC Rallye Deutschland 2020) was a motor racing event for rally cars that was scheduled to be held over four days between 15 and 18 October 2020, but was cancelled due to the COVID-19 pandemic. It was set to mark the thirty-eighth running of Rallye Deutschland and planned to be the twelfth round of the 2020 World Rally Championship, World Rally Championship-2 and World Rally Championship-3. It was also planned to run as the final round of the 2020 Junior World Rally Championship. The 2020 event was scheduled to be based in Bostalsee in Saarland.

Ott Tänak and Martin Järveoja were the defending rally winners. The team they drove for in 2019, Toyota Gazoo Racing WRT, were the defending manufacturers' winners. Jan Kopecký and Pavel Dresler were the defending winners in the World Rally Championship-2 category. (Note: The championship was known as the World Rally Championship-2 Pro in 2019.) In the World Rally Championship-3 category, Fabian Kreim and Tobias Braun were the reigning rally winners. (Note: The championship was known as the World Rally Championship-2 in 2019.)

== Notes ==
Previous rally: N/A	2020 FIA World Rally Championship	Next rally: N/A
Previous rally: 2019 Rallye Deutschland	2020 Rallye Deutschland	Next rally: TBD
