= 2020 Rally New Zealand =

2020 edition of Rally New Zealand

2020 Rally New Zealand: 40. Rally New Zealand
- Part of the 2020 World Rally Championship
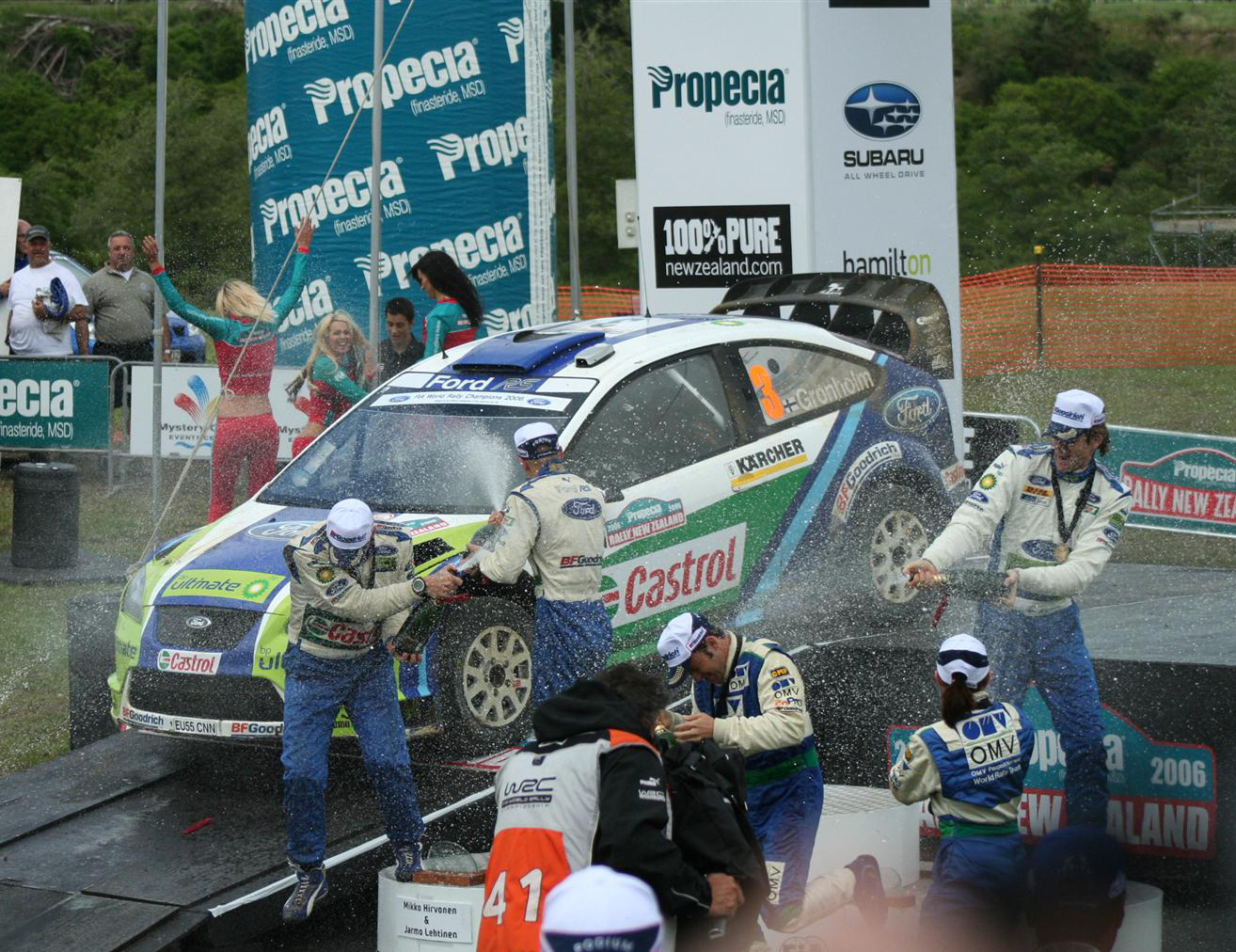
- Rally New Zealand's return to the World Rally Championship was cancelled as a result of the COVID-19 pandemic.
- Host country: New Zealand
- Rally base: Auckland, Auckland Region
- Held on: Scheduled for 3–6 September 2020
- Stage surface: Gravel

Statistics
- Cancellation: Rally cancelled due to COVID-19 pandemic.

The 2020 Rally New Zealand (also known as the Rally New Zealand 2020) was a motor racing event for rally cars that was scheduled to be held over four days between 3 and 6 September 2020, but was cancelled due to the COVID-19 pandemic. It was set to mark the forty-fifth running of Rally New Zealand and planned to be the ninth round of the 2020 World Rally Championship, World Rally Championship-2 and World Rally Championship-3. The 2020 event was scheduled to be based in Auckland in Auckland Region.

Sébastien Loeb and Daniel Elena were the overall reigning rally winners. Citroën Total World Rally Team, the team they drove for in 2012, when Rally New Zealand held a World Rally Championship event last time, were the defending manufacturers' winners. However, they would not defend the rally either as they withdrew from the championship at the end of 2019.

== Background ==
=== Preparation and cancellation ===
The rally had been planned to be the mark of Rally New Zealand after an eight-year absence from the championship, sharing a spot with Rally Australia in the WRC calendar since 2020. However, concerns regarding whether the rally should be held were raised in response to the COVID-19 pandemic. On 4 June 2020, it was officially announced that the rally would not be held in 2020, but a 2021 event is expected.

Previous rally: N/A	2020 FIA World Rally Championship	Next rally: N/A
Previous rally: 2012 Rally New Zealand	2020 Rally New Zealand	Next rally: 2022 Rally New Zealand
