= 2020 Rally de Portugal =

2020 edition of Rally de Portugal

2020 Rally de Portugal: 54. Vodafone Rally de Portugal
- Part of the 2020 World Rally Championship
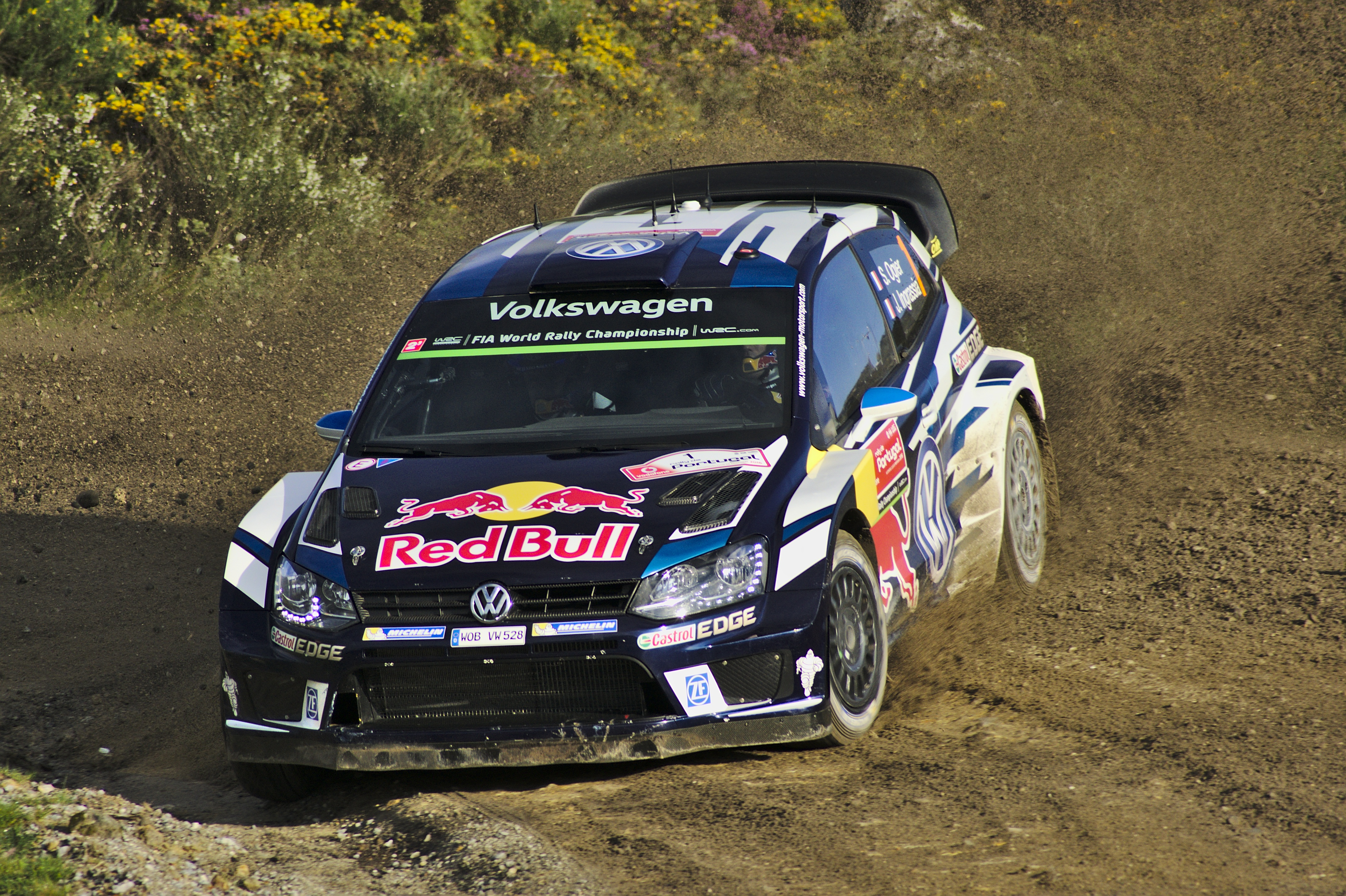
- The rally is famous for its huge rocks and deep ruts.
- Host country: Portugal
- Rally base: Matosinhos, Porto
- Held on: Scheduled for 21–24 May 2020
- Start location: Lousã, Coimbra
- Finish location: Fafe, Braga
- Stages: 22 (331.10 km; 205.74 miles)
- Stage surface: Gravel
- Transport distance: 1,250.46 km (777.00 miles)
- Overall distance: 1,581.56 km (982.74 miles)

Statistics
- Cancellation: Rally cancelled due to COVID-19 pandemic.

The 2020 Rally de Portugal (also known as the Vodafone Rally de Portugal 2020) was a motor racing event for rally cars that was scheduled to be held over four days between 21 and 24 May 2020, but was cancelled due to the COVID-19 pandemic. It was set to mark the fifty-fourth running of Rally de Portugal and planned to be the fifth round of the 2020 World Rally Championship, World Rally Championship-2 and World Rally Championship-3. The 2020 event was scheduled to be based in Matosinhos in Porto and consisted of twenty-two special stages covering a total competitive distance of 331.10 km (205.74 mi).

Ott Tänak and Martin Järveoja were the defending rally winners. Toyota Gazoo Racing WRT, the team they drove for in 2019, were the defending manufacturers' winners. Kalle Rovanperä and Jonne Halttunen were the defending winners in the World Rally Championship-2 category, (Note: The championship was known as the World Rally Championship-2 Pro in 2019.) but they would not defend their titles as they were promoted to the higher class. In the World Rally Championship-3 category, Pierre-Louis Loubet and Vincent Landais were the reigning rally winners. (Note: The championship was known as the World Rally Championship-2 in 2019.)

== Background ==
=== Route ===
==== Itinerary ====
All dates and times were WEST (UTC+1).

Date	Time	No.	Stage name	Distance
—N/a	08:00	—	Paredes [Shakedown]	4.60 km
Leg 1 — 122.76 km
—N/a	08:08	SS1	Lousã 1	12.35 km
—N/a	09:08	SS2	Góis 1	19.46 km
—N/a	10:08	SS3	Arganil 1	18.77 km
—N/a	12:31	SS4	Lousã 2	12.35 km
—N/a	13:31	SS5	Góis 2	19.46 km
—N/a	14:31	SS6	Arganil 2	18.77 km
—N/a	15:58	SS7	Mortágua	18.24 km
—N/a	19:03	SS8	Lousada	3.36 km
Leg 2 — 141.68 km
—N/a	08:08	SS9	Vieira do Minho 1	20.59 km
—N/a	09:08	SS10	Cabeceiras de Basto 1	22.22 km
—N/a	10:28	SS11	Amarante 1	30.36 km
—N/a	15:03	SS12	Vieira do Minho 2	20.59 km
—N/a	16:03	SS13	Cabeceiras de Basto 2	22.22 km
—N/a	17:23	SS14	Amarante 2	30.36 km
—N/a	19:03	SS15	Porto Street Stage 1	1.95 km
—N/a	19:28	SS16	Gaia Street Stage 2	1.95 km
Leg 3 — 58.10 km
—N/a	07:08	SS17	Felgueiras 1	7.08 km
—N/a	08:03	SS18	Montim 1	8.71 km
—N/a	08:58	SS19	Fafe 1	11.18 km
—N/a	09:53	SS20	Felgueiras 2	7.08 km
—N/a	10:48	SS21	Montim 2	8.71 km
—N/a	12:18	SS22	Fafe 2 [Power Stage]	11.18 km

== Notes ==
Previous rally: N/A	2020 FIA World Rally Championship	Next rally: N/A
Previous rally: 2019 Rally de Portugal	2020 Rally de Portugal	Next rally: 2021 Rally de Portugal
