= 2020 Safari Rally =

2020 edition of Safari Rally

2020 Safari Rally: 68. KCB Safari Rally Kenya
- Part of the 2020 World Rally Championship
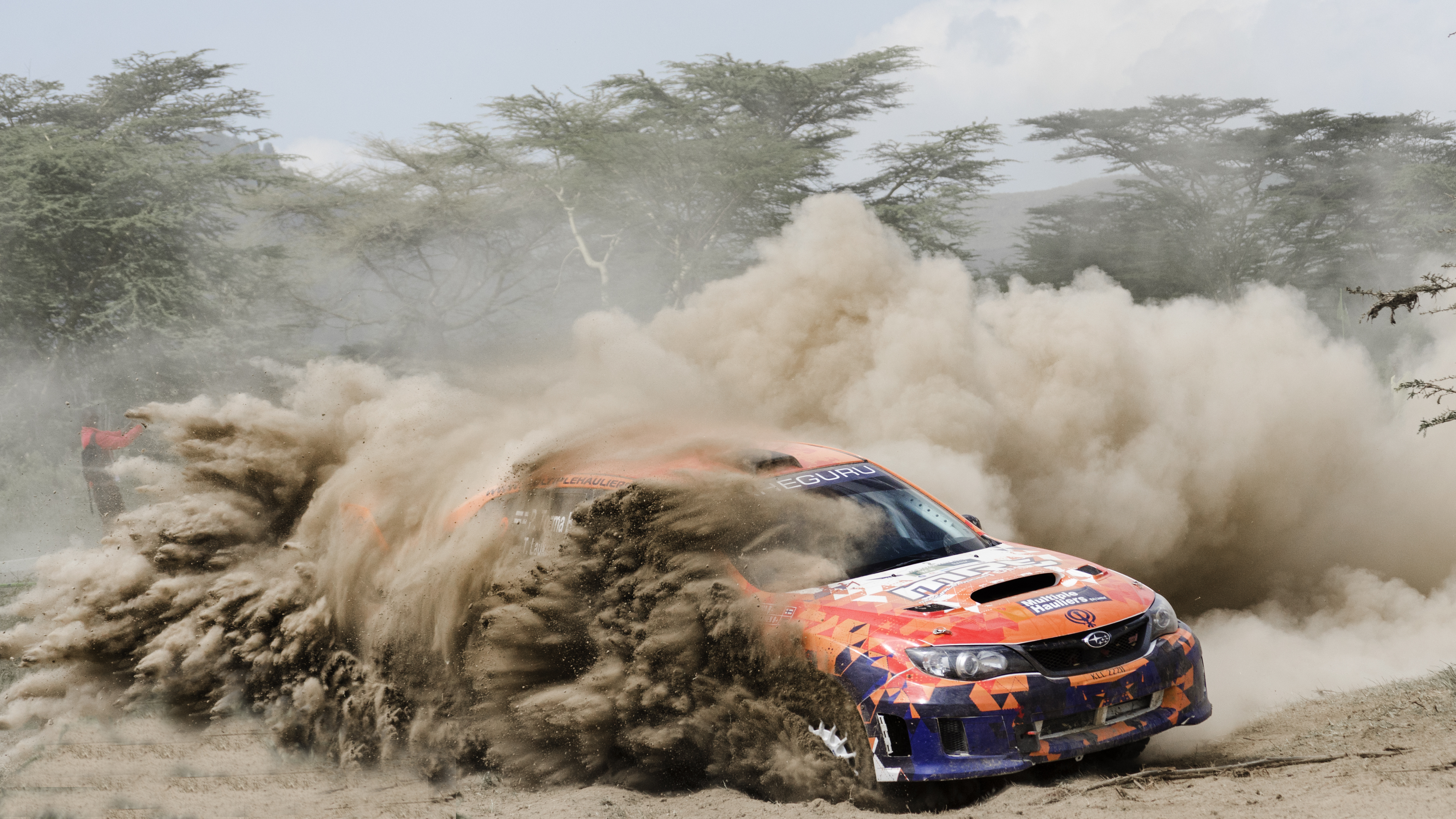
- The return of Rally Kenya was delayed to 2021 due to the COVID-19 pandemic.
- Host country: Kenya
- Rally base: Nairobi, Nairobi County
- Held on: Scheduled for 16–19 July 2020
- Start location: Kasarani, Nairobi
- Finish location: Hell's Gate National Park, Naivasha
- Stages: 18 (315.12 km; 195.81 miles)
- Stage surface: Gravel
- Transport distance: 709.98 km (441.16 miles)
- Overall distance: 1,025.10 km (636.97 miles)

Statistics
- Cancellation: Rally cancelled due to COVID-19 pandemic.

The 2020 Safari Rally (also known as the KCB Safari Rally Kenya 2020) was a motor racing event for rally cars that was scheduled to be held over four days between 16 and 19 July 2020, but was cancelled due to the COVID-19 pandemic. It was set to mark the sixty-eighth running of Safari Rally and planned to be the seventh round of the 2020 World Rally Championship, World Rally Championship-2 and World Rally Championship-3. The 2020 event was scheduled to be based in Nairobi in Nairobi County and consisted of eighteen special stages covering a total competitive distance of 315.12 km (195.81 mi).

Colin McRae and Nicky Grist were the overall reigning rally winners, but they would not defend their titles as they were no longer active in the sport. Ford World Rally Team, the team they drove for in 2002, when Safari Rally held a World Rally Championship event last time, were the defending manufacturers' winners. However, they would not defend the rally either as they withdrew from the championship at the end of 2012.

== Background ==
=== Route ===
The itinerary was shortened around 500 km (310.7 miles).

==== Itinerary ====
All dates and times were EAT (UTC+3).

Date	Time	No.	Stage name	Distance
—N/a	13:01	—	KWS Naivasha [Shakedown]	5.30 km
Leg 1 — 136.08 km
—N/a	14:08	SS1	Super Special Kasarani	4.80 km
—N/a	08:20	SS2	Chui Lodge 1	13.34 km
—N/a	09:16	SS3	Kedong 1	33.43 km
—N/a	10:29	SS4	Oserian 1	18.87 km
—N/a	13:34	SS5	Chui Lodge 2	13.34 km
—N/a	14:30	SS6	Kedong 2	33.43 km
—N/a	15:43	SS7	Oserian 2	18.87 km
Leg 2 — 131.94 km
—N/a	08:08	SS8	Elmentaita 1	14.64 km
—N/a	09:08	SS9	Soysambu 1	20.33 km
—N/a	10:22	SS10	Sleeping Warrior 1	31.00 km
—N/a	14:08	SS11	Elmentaita 2	14.64 km
—N/a	15:08	SS12	Soysambu 2	20.33 km
—N/a	16:22	SS13	Sleeping Warrior 2	31.00 km
Leg 3 — 51.90 km
—N/a	07:55	SS14	Loldia 1	11.27 km
—N/a	09:08	SS15	Hells Gate 1	10.39 km
—N/a	10:44	SS16	Malewa	8.58 km
—N/a	11:27	SS17	Loldia 2	11.27 km
—N/a	13:18	SS18	Hells Gate 2 [Power Stage]	10.39 km

=== Preparation and cancellation ===
The return of the Safari Rally was long pushed by the FIA president Jean Todt. A candidate event was successfully run in 2019, with WRC safety delegate Michèle Mouton visited the rally. On 27 September 2019, the rally was officially announced to be a part of the championship for the first time since 2002. However, the COVID-19 pandemic delayed its return to the championship to 2021.

Previous rally: N/A	2020 FIA World Rally Championship	Next rally: N/A
Previous rally: 2002 Safari Rally	2020 Safari Rally	Next rally: 2021 Safari Rally
