= 2020 Junior WRC Championship =

The 2020 FIA Junior WRC Championship was the eighth season of Junior WRC, a rallying championship governed by the Fédération Internationale de l'Automobile, running in support of the World Rally Championship. The championship was open to drivers under the age of thirty—although no such restriction existed for co-drivers—competing in identical one-litre Ford Fiesta R2s built and maintained by M-Sport. The championship was contested over four selected WRC rounds with the winning crew awarded a new Ford Fiesta R5 car, 200 tyres, free registration into the 2021 WRC3 Championship and five free rally entries. The championship offered an additional prize of €15,000 to the highest-placed rookie driver to fund a drive in the 2021 Junior WRC Championship.

Tom Kristensson and Joakim Sjöberg won the driver and co-driver championships, while Sweden sealed back-to-back Nations' Trophies.

== Calendar ==
The 2020 Junior WRC Championship calendar consisted of four events taken from the 2020 World Rally Championship.

Round	Start date	Finish date	Rally	Rally headquarters	Surface	Stages	Distance	Ref.
1	13 February	16 February	Rally Sweden	Torsby, Värmland	Snow	11	171.64 km (Note: The route of Rally Sweden was shortened from 301.26 km over 19 stages to 11 stages totalling 171.64 km. The route was shortened due to a lack of snow.)	
2	4 September	6 September	Rally Estonia	Tartu, Tartu County	Gravel	17	232.64 km	
3	8 October	11 October	(Italy) Rally Italia Sardegna	Alghero, Sardinia	Gravel	20	308.57 km	
4	3 December	6 December	(Italy) ACI Rally Monza	Monza, Brianza	Tarmac	16	241.37 km	

=== Calendar changes ===
The 2020 calendar was revised from the 2019 schedule. The Tour de Corse and Wales Rally GB were removed from the calendar, while events in Chile and Germany were added in their place. However, Rally Chile was later cancelled in the face of ongoing political unrest in the country, and Wales Rally GB was added back onto the calendar. Rally Italia Sardegna was postponed in response to the COVID-19 pandemic. A new calendar was revised after the championship was interrupted by six months. Ypres Rally was set to be the season's finale, but were unable to do so as the rally was cancelled due to the COVID-19 pandemic. The finale moved to Monza instead.

== Entries ==
The following crews entered into the championship:

Entrant	Drivers	Co-drivers	Rounds
Fabio Andolfi	(Italy) Fabio Andolfi	(Italy) Savoia Stefano	All
Jon Armstrong	(United Kingdom) Jon Armstrong	(Republic of Ireland) Noel O'Sullivan	1
Raul Baidu	(Romania) Raul Badiu	(Romania) Gabriel Lazar	1–2
Ruairi Bell	(United Kingdom) Ruairi Bell	(United Kingdom) Darren Garrod	1, 3-4
Ruairi Bell	(United Kingdom) Ruairi Bell	(United Kingdom) Matthew Edwards	2
Tommaso Ciuffi	(Italy) Tommaso Ciuffi	(Italy) Nicolo Gonella	1
Lauri Joona	(Finland) Lauri Joona	(Finland) Ari Koponen	1
Tom Kristensson Motorsport	(Sweden) Tom Kristensson	(Sweden) Joakim Sjöberg	All
Pontus Lönnström	(Sweden) Pontus Lönnström	(Sweden) Stefan Gustavsson	1–2
Catie Munnings	(United Kingdom) Catie Munnings	(Sweden) Ida Lidebjer-Granberg	1
Enrico Oldrati	(Italy) Enrico Oldrati	(Italy) Elia de Guio	1–3
Team Flying Finn	(Finland) Sami Pajari	(Finland) Marko Salminen	All
Marco Pollara	(Italy) Marco Pollara	(Italy) Maurizio Messina	1–3
LMT Autosporta Akademija	(Latvia) Mārtiņš Sesks	(Latvia) Renars Francis	All
PS 110% AB	(Norway) Oscar Solberg	(Sweden) Jim Hjerpe	1
Estonian Autosport Junior Team	(Estonia) Ken Torn	(Estonia) Kauri Pannas	1–2
Robert Virves	(Estonia) Robert Virves	(Estonia) Sander Pruul	2
Fabrizio Zaldivar	(Paraguay) Fabrizio Zaldívar	(Argentina) Fernando Mussano	1–3
Fabrizio Zaldivar	(Paraguay) Fabrizio Zaldívar	(Spain) Rogelio Peñate	4

== Results and standings ==
=== Season summary ===
Round	Event	Winning driver	Winning co-driver	Winning time	Report	Ref.
1	Rally Sweden	(Sweden) Tom Kristensson	(Sweden) Joakim Sjöberg	1:22:51.3	Report	
2	Rally Estonia	(Latvia) Mārtiņš Sesks	(Latvia) Renars Francis	2:21:20.5	Report	
3	(Italy) Rally Italia Sardegna	(Sweden) Tom Kristensson	(Sweden) Joakim Sjöberg	3:07:49.1	Report	
4	(Italy) ACI Rally Monza	(Sweden) Tom Kristensson	(Sweden) Joakim Sjöberg	2:35:21.4	Report	

=== Scoring system ===
Points are awarded to the top ten classified finishers. An additional point is given for every stage win. 1.5-time bonus points were awarded for both drivers' and co-drivers' championships at the season's finale.

Position	1st	2nd	3rd	4th	5th	6th	7th	8th	9th	10th
Points	25	18	15	12	10	8	6	4	2	1

=== FIA Junior WRC Championship for Drivers ===
(Results key)

Pos.	Driver	SWE (Sweden)	EST (Estonia)	ITA (Italy)	MNZ (Italy)	Points
1	(Sweden) Tom Kristensson	1^{3}	Ret^{1}	1^{4}	1^{7}	100.5
2	(Latvia) Mārtiņš Sesks	2^{1}	1^{3}	3^{5}	Ret^{1}	69
3	(Finland) Sami Pajari	4^{1}	2^{8}	5^{6}	4^{4}	66
4	(Paraguay) Fabrizio Zaldívar	6	6	2	2	53
5	(United Kingdom) Ruairi Bell	7	4	Ret	3^{2}	42.5
6	(Italy) Marco Pollara	10	5	6		19
7	(Estonia) Ken Torn	3	Ret^{3}			18
8	(Italy) Enrico Oldrati	11	7	4		18
9	(Estonia) Robert Virves		3^{2}			17
10	(Romania) Raul Badiu	5^{2}	8			16
11	(Sweden) Pontus Lönnström	8^{2}	Ret			6
12	(Finland) Lauri Joona	9				2
–	(Italy) Tommaso Ciuffi	12				–
–	(Norway) Oscar Solberg	13				–
–	(United Kingdom) Catie Munnings	14				–
–	(Italy) Fabio Andolfi	Ret	Ret	DNS	Ret	–
–	(United Kingdom) Jon Armstrong	Ret				–
Pos.	Driver	SWE (Sweden)	EST (Estonia)	ITA (Italy)	MNZ (Italy)	Points

=== FIA Junior WRC Championship for Co-Drivers ===
(Results key)

Pos.	Co-Driver	SWE (Sweden)	EST (Estonia)	ITA (Italy)	MNZ (Italy)	Points
1	(Sweden) Joakim Sjöberg	1^{3}	Ret^{1}	1^{4}	1^{7}	100.5
2	(Latvia) Renars Francis	2^{1}	1^{3}	3^{5}	Ret^{1}	69
3	(Finland) Marko Salminen	4^{1}	2^{8}	5^{6}	4^{4}	66
4	(Argentina) Fernando Mussano	6	6	2		34
5	(United Kingdom) Darren Garrod	7		Ret	3^{2}	30.5
6	(Italy) Maurizio Messina	10	5	6		19
7	(Spain) Rogelio Peñate				2	18
8	(Estonia) Kauri Pannas	3	Ret^{3}			18
9	(Italy) Elia de Guio	11	7	4		18
10	(Estonia) Sander Pruul		3^{2}			17
11	(Romania) Gabriel Lazar	5^{2}	8			16
12	(United Kingdom) Matthew Edwards		4			12
13	(Sweden) Stefan Gustavsson	8^{2}	Ret			6
14	(Finland) Ari Koponen	9				2
–	(Italy) Nicolo Gonella	12				–
–	(Sweden) Jim Hjerpe	13				–
–	(Sweden) Ida Lidebjer-Granberg	14				–
–	(Italy) Stefano Savoia	Ret	Ret	DNS	Ret	–
–	(Republic of Ireland) Noel O'Sullivan	Ret				–
Pos.	Co-Driver	SWE (Sweden)	EST (Estonia)	ITA (Italy)	MNZ (Italy)	Points

=== FIA Junior WRC Trophy for Nations ===
(Results key)

Pos.	Nation	SWE (Sweden)	EST (Estonia)	ITA (Italy)	MNZ (Italy)	Points
1	Sweden	1	Ret	1	1	75
2	Latvia	2	1	3	Ret	58
3	Paraguay	6	6	2	2	52
4	Finland	4	2	5	4	52
5	United Kingdom	7	4	Ret	3	33
6	Estonia	3	3			30
7	Italy	8	5	4	Ret	26
8	Romania	5	7			16
9	Norway	9				2
Pos.	Nation	SWE (Sweden)	EST (Estonia)	ITA (Italy)	MNZ (Italy)	Points
