= Rally Japan =

Rally competition held in Japan

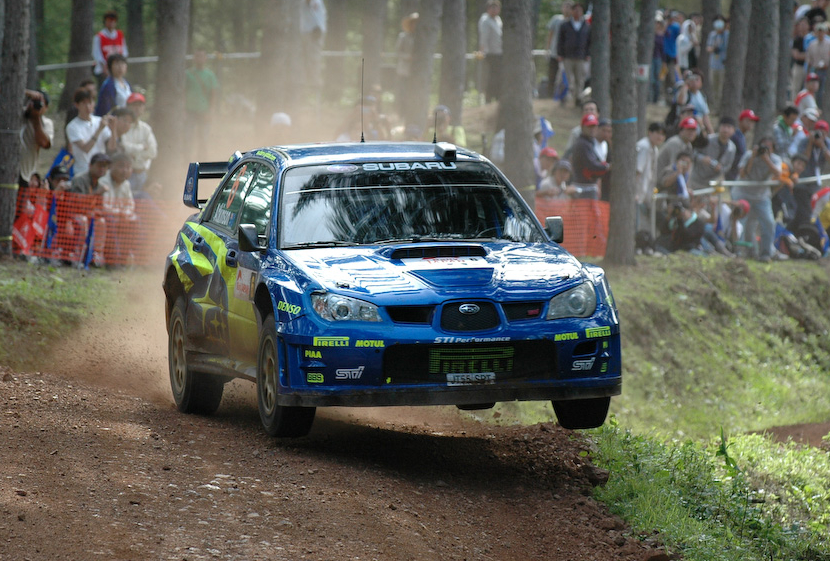
- Chris Atkinson driving his Subaru Impreza WRC in 2006 Rally Japan.
- Genre: Rallying
- Frequency: Annual
- Location: Chūbu region
- Country: Japan
- Inaugurated: 2004
- Website: www.rally-japan.jp

Rally Japan (ラリージャパン) is a rally competition held in Hokkaidō, Japan. The event made its debut in the FIA World Rally Championship during the 2004 season. From 2004 to 2007, the event was held on the twisty and narrow gravel roads of the Tokachi region near Obihiro. For the 2008 season, the event was moved to the region close to Sapporo, Hokkaidō's main city. Rally Japan was not held in 2009, but returned in 2010 for one year. Rally Japan was planned to return in 2020 to the new location of Nagoya, but was cancelled on August 19 due to COVID-19 pandemic in Japan. It was cancelled again in 2021, and returned as the last rally of the season in 2022.

== History ==
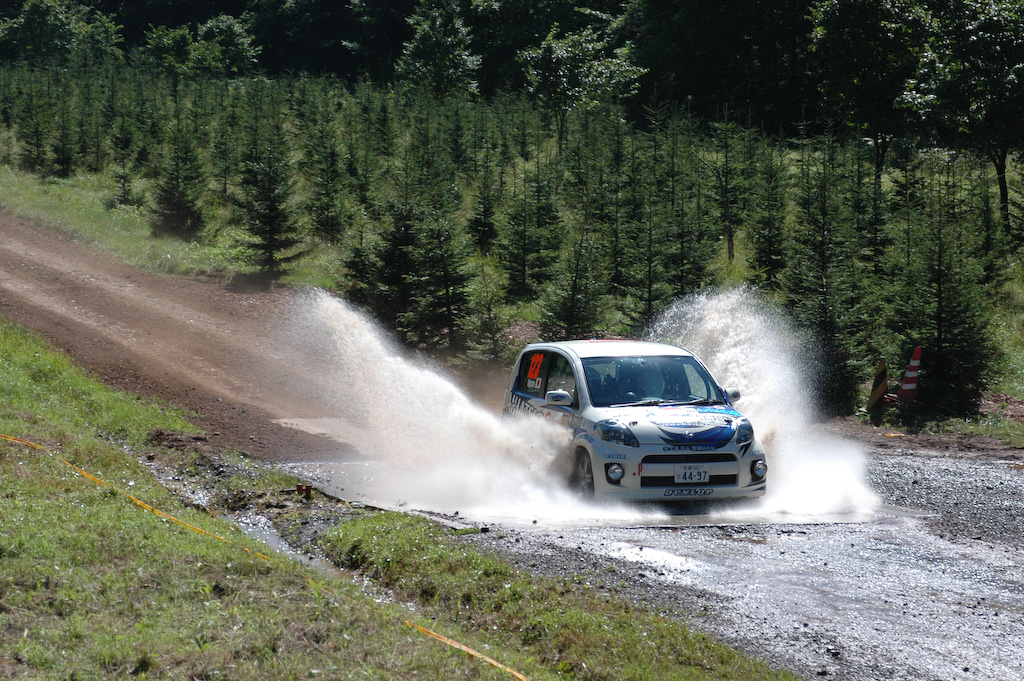
A Daihatsu competitor during a stage in Rikubetsu in 2006.

Rally Hokkaido was first organised as part of the 2002 Asia-Pacific Rally Championship on the northern island of Hokkaidō. After two successful rallies the event was renamed Rally Japan and promoted to the 2004 World Rally Championship schedule. The rally was won by the 2003 world champion Petter Solberg of the Subaru World Rally Team. For 2005 the World and Asia-Pacific Rally events were split into two separate event with the APRC round returning to the Rally Hokkaido name.

The 2005 Rally Japan was held on September 30 through October 2. Headquarters and the service park were located in and near Obihiro, Hokkaidō. The rally was won by Marcus Grönholm in a Peugeot 307 WRC 1:22.1 ahead of Sébastien Loeb in a Citroën Xsara WRC. This was the last of the three world rally wins for the 307 WRC, and also the last win for the Peugeot factory team. The 2006 event was won by Loeb 5.6 seconds ahead of Grönholm.

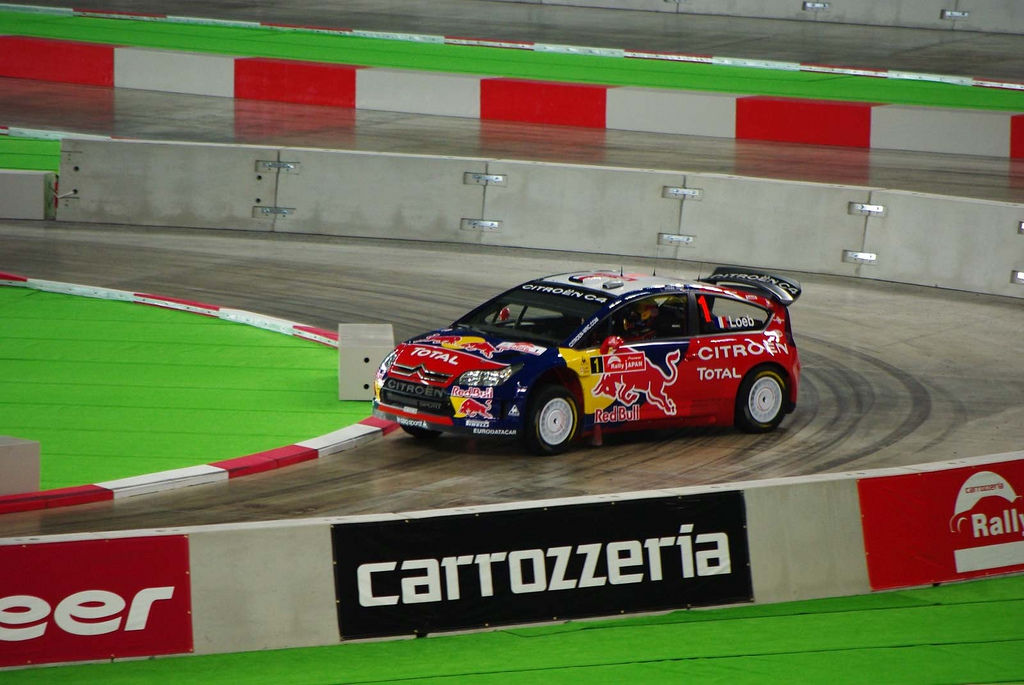
Sébastien Loeb at the Sapporo Dome during the 2008 event.

Rally Japan was the fourteenth rally on the World Rally Championship schedule for the 2007 season. It featured 27 special stages, and was won by Mikko Hirvonen of BP Ford World Rally Team. This win was third in Hirvonen's career as a top level rally driver. The 2007 edition of the event was also remarkable for the retirements of both 2007 title contenders on the same rally; Marcus Grönholm retired on the first day of the rally after heavily damaging the roll cage of his Ford Focus RS WRC 07 on stage four. Sébastien Loeb retired on the next leg of the rally after his co-driver Daniel Elena called out the wrong pace note instruction for the first time in ten years.

In December 2007, Rally Japan organisers announced that for the 2008 WRC season the event will move from Obihiro to Sapporo, the biggest city in Hokkaidō. The 2008 Rally Japan featured 29 stages, including five super specials at the Sapporo Dome. The event saw Hirvonen take his second win in Japan in a row, ahead of his teammate Jari-Matti Latvala and Citroën Total's Sébastien Loeb, who secured a record fifth title with his third-place finish. The rally also featured a bad crash by François Duval, which injured his co-driver Patrick Pivato.

The 2022 Rally Japan saw the event returns to the calendar for the first time since 2010. The rally moved its headquarters from Hokkaidō to a new base in Nagoya and is run on tarmac rather than gravel. In October 2024, it was announced that the organizers signed a five-year extension with WRC Promoter GmbH, meaning the rally would stay on the World Rally Championship calendar until 2028.

== Past winners ==
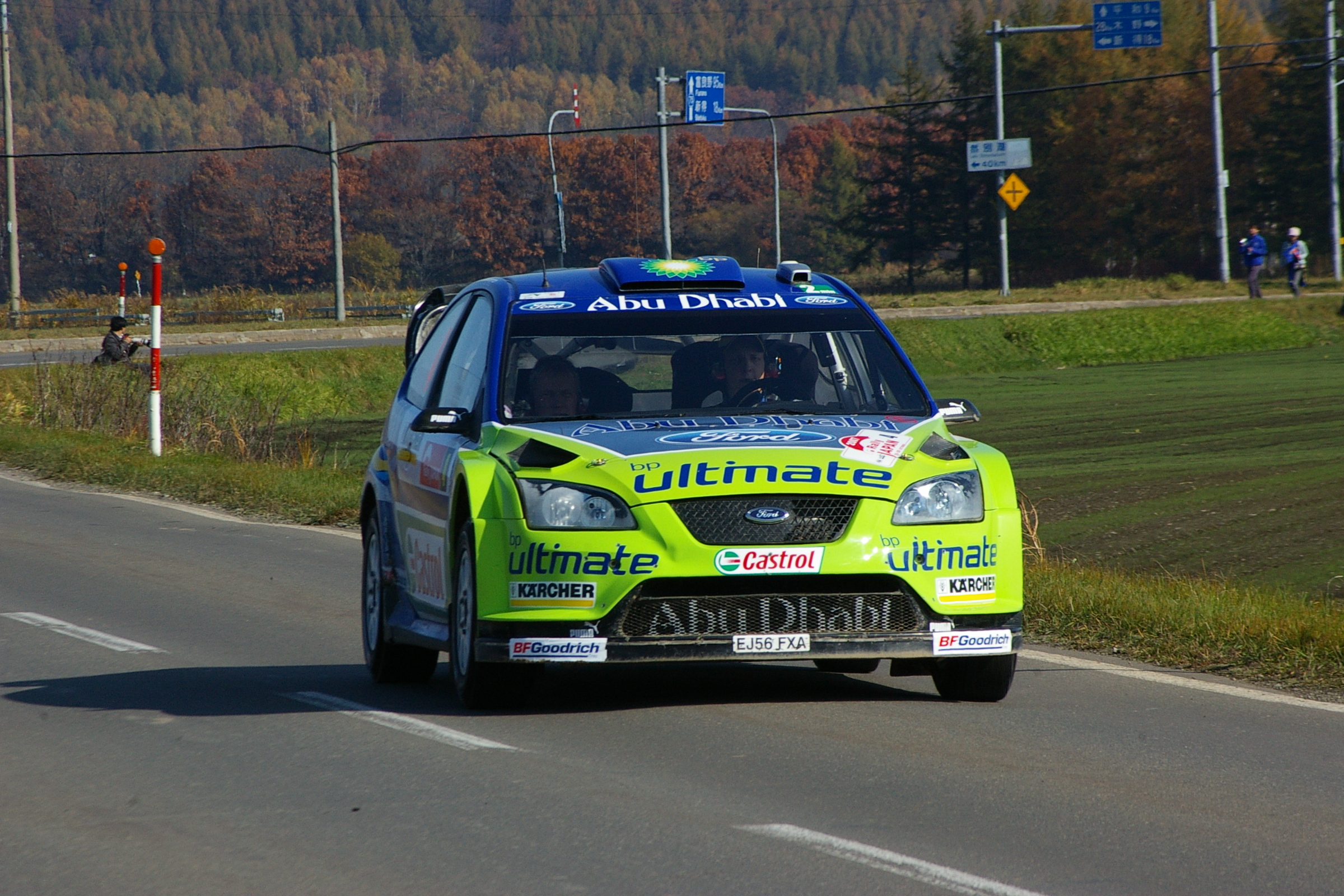
Mikko Hirvonen during a road section of the 2007 Rally Japan.

Season	Driver Co-driver	Car	Event report
2004	(Norway) Petter Solberg (Wales) Phil Mills	(Japan) Subaru Impreza WRC 2004	Report
2005	(Finland) Marcus Grönholm (Finland) Timo Rautiainen	(France) Peugeot 307 WRC	Report
2006	(France) Sébastien Loeb (Monaco) Daniel Elena	(France) Citroën Xsara WRC	Report
2007	(Finland) Mikko Hirvonen (Finland) Jarmo Lehtinen	(United Kingdom) Ford Focus RS WRC 07	Report
2008	(Finland) Mikko Hirvonen (Finland) Jarmo Lehtinen	(United Kingdom) Ford Focus RS WRC 08	Report
2010	(France) Sébastien Ogier (France) Julien Ingrassia	(France) Citroën C4 WRC	Report
2011–2019	Not held		
2020–2021	Cancelled		
2022	(Belgium) Thierry Neuville (Belgium) Martijn Wydaeghe	(South Korea) Hyundai i20 N Rally1	Report
2023	(United Kingdom) Elfyn Evans (United Kingdom) Scott Martin	(Japan) Toyota GR Yaris Rally1	Report
2024	(United Kingdom) Elfyn Evans (United Kingdom) Scott Martin	(Japan) Toyota GR Yaris Rally1	Report
2025	(France) Sébastien Ogier (France) Vincent Landais	(Japan) Toyota GR Yaris Rally1	Report
2026	(United Kingdom) Elfyn Evans (United Kingdom) Scott Martin	(Japan) Toyota GR Yaris Rally1	Report
