= Ypres Rally =

Rallying competition in Belgium

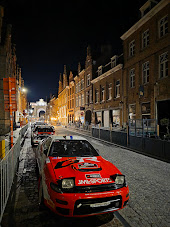
- Status: Active
- Genre: Motorsporting event
- Frequency: Annual
- Location: Ypres
- Country: Belgium
- Inaugurated: 1965
- Website: ypresrally.com

The Belgium Ypres Westhoek Rally (BYWR) is a rally race held since 1965 in Ypres, Belgium. It was founded by Frans Thévelin and has been included in the European Rally Championship, the Belgian Rally Championship, the British Rally Championship, and the Intercontinental Rally Challenge. It was a round of the 2021 World Rally Championship and the 2022 World Rally Championship replacing the cancelled Rally GB.

In its history, the rally has had some famous pilots and co-pilots participating, such as Didier Auriol, Colin McRae, Alister McRae, Juha Kankkunen, François Duval, Michèle Mouton, Jean Todt, Armin Schwarz and Ari Vatanen among others. It was hosted for 44 years by A.C. Targa Florio from 1965 till 2008. It is currently hosted by Super Stage under management of Alain Penasse.

The Ypres Historic Rally is a classic rally held since 1993, and is a round of the European Historic Rally Championship.

== Winners ==
| Year | Driver | Car |
|---|---|---|
| 1965 | (Belgium) Jean Pierre Vandermeersch | Austin Cooper |
| 1966 | (Belgium) Hubert Saelens | Lotus Elan |
| 1967 | (Belgium) "Hervé" | Lotus Elan |
| 1968 | (Belgium) "Vandyck" | BMW 2002 |
| 1969 | (Belgium) Gilbert Staepelare | Ford Cortina |
| 1970 | (Belgium) Gilbert Staepelare | Ford Escort |
| 1971 | (Belgium) "Pedro" | BMW 2002 |
| 1972 | (Belgium) Gilbert Staepelare | Ford Escort |
| 1973 | (Belgium) "Pedro" | BMW 2002 |
| 1974 | (Belgium) Gilbert Staepelare | Ford Escort |
| 1975 | (Belgium) Bernard Mordacq | Porsche Carrera |
| 1976 | (Germany) Walter Röhrl | Opel Kadett GT/E |
| 1977 | (France) Bernard Darniche | Lancia Stratos HF |
| 1978 | (United Kingdom) Tony Pond | Triumph TR8 |
| 1979 | (France) Bernard Béguin | Porsche Carrera |
| 1980 | (United Kingdom) Tony Pond | Triumph TR8 |
| 1981 | (France) Jean-Claude Andruet | Ferrari 308 GTB |
| 1982 | (Belgium) Marc Duez | Porsche 911 SC |
| 1983 | (Italy) Massimo Biasion | Lancia 037 Rally |
| 1984 | (Finland) Henri Toivonen | Porsche 911 SC |
| 1985 | (France) Jean Ragnotti | Renault R5 Maxi Turbo |
| 1986 | (Belgium) Robert Droogmans | Ford RS200 |
| 1987 | (United Kingdom) Jimmy McRae | Ford Sierra RS Cosworth |
| 1988 | (Belgium) Robert Droogmans | Ford Sierra RS Cosworth |
| 1989 | (Belgium) Robert Droogmans | Ford Sierra RS Cosworth |
| 1990 | (Belgium) Robert Droogmans | Lancia Delta Integrale |
| 1991 | (Belgium) Patrick Snijers | Ford Sierra Cosworth 4x4 |
| 1992 | (Belgium) Patrick Snijers | Ford Sierra Cosworth 4x4 |
| 1993 | (Belgium) Patrick Snijers | Ford Escort RS Cosworth |
| 1994 | (Belgium) Patrick Snijers | Ford Escort RS Cosworth |
| 1995 | (Belgium) Renaud Verreydt | Toyota Celica GT-Four |
| 1996 | (Belgium) Freddy Loix | Toyota Celica GT-Four ST205 |
| 1997 | (Belgium) Freddy Loix | Toyota Celica GT-Four ST205 |
| 1998 | (Belgium) Freddy Loix | Toyota Corolla WRC |
| 1999 | (Belgium) Freddy Loix | Mitsubishi Carisma GT |
| 2000 | (Denmark) Henrik Lundgaard | Toyota Corolla WRC |
| 2001 | (Belgium) Pieter Tsjoen | Toyota Corolla WRC |
| 2002 | (Belgium) Bruno Thiry | Peugeot 206 WRC |
| 2003 | (Belgium) Bruno Thiry | Peugeot 206 WRC |
| 2004 | (Belgium) Larry Cols | Renault Clio S1600 |
| 2005 | (Belgium) Kris Princen | Renault Clio S1600 |
| 2006 | (Italy) Giandomenico Basso | Fiat Punto Abarth S2000 |
| 2007 | (Italy) Luca Rossetti | Peugeot 207 S2000 |
| 2008 | (Belgium) Freddy Loix | Peugeot 207 S2000 |
| 2009 | (United Kingdom) Kris Meeke | Peugeot 207 S2000 |
| 2010 | (Belgium) Freddy Loix | Škoda Fabia S2000 |
| 2011 | (Belgium) Freddy Loix | Škoda Fabia S2000 |
| 2012 | (Finland) Juho Hänninen | Škoda Fabia S2000 |
| 2013 | (Belgium) Freddy Loix | Škoda Fabia S2000 |
| 2014 | (Belgium) Freddy Loix | Škoda Fabia S2000 |
| 2015 | (Belgium) Freddy Loix | Škoda Fabia R5 |
| 2016 | (Belgium) Freddy Loix | Škoda Fabia R5 |
| 2017 | (Netherlands) Kevin Abbring | Peugeot 208 R5 |
| 2018 | (Belgium) Thierry Neuville | Hyundai i20 R5 |
| 2019 | (Republic of Ireland) Craig Breen | Volkswagen Polo GTI R5 |
| 2020 | Cancelled due to COVID-19 pandemic | |
| 2021 | (Belgium) Thierry Neuville | Hyundai i20 Coupe WRC |
| 2022 | (Estonia) Ott Tänak | Hyundai i20 N Rally1 |
| 2023 | (France) Adrien Fourmaux | Ford Fiesta Rally2 |
| 2024 | (France) Stéphane Lefebvre | Hyundai i20 N Rally2 |
| 2025 | (France) Stéphane Lefebvre | Toyota GR Yaris Rally2 |
| 2026 | (France) Stéphane Lefebvre | Toyota GR Yaris Rally2 |
