= Boss =

Boss may refer to:

== Animals ==
- The Boss (bear), a wild grizzly bear in Canada
- Boss, the bone shield of an African buffalo's horns
- Boss, the bony mass on the skull of some dinosaurs from family Ceratopsidae

== Arts and entertainment ==
=== Architecture ===
- Boss (architecture), a protruding stone, often decoratively carved
- Lifting boss, a knob or protrusion left by masons on blocks to facilitate levering or lifting

=== Fictional characters ===
- Boss (Mazinger), from the anime Mazinger Z
- Boss Hogg, the main villain of the television show The Dukes of Hazzard
- Pointy-haired Boss, the office nemesis of cartoon character Dilbert
- The Boss (Metal Gear), in the video game Metal Gear Solid 3: Snake Eater
- Boss, the narrator of A Connecticut Yankee in King Arthur's Court
- "The Boss", Nicolas Lucifer III, from the animated series The Baskervilles
- "The Boss" (simply known as "playa" in the first game), the main character of the Saints Row series

=== Film ===
- Boss (2006 film), an Indian Telugu-language film
- Boss (2011 film), an Indian Kannada-language film
- Boss: Born to Rule, a 2013 Indian Bengali-language film starring Jeet
  - Boss 2, its 2017 sequel
- Boss Nigger, a 1975 western that also goes by the name Boss
- Boss (2013 Hindi film), an Indian Hindi-language film starring Akshay Kumar
- Boss (2025 film), South Korean action comedy
- The Boss (1915 film), a silent film based on the play by Edward Sheldon
- The Boss (1956 film), an American film by Byron Haskin
- The Boss (1973 film) or Il Boss, an Italian crime film
- The Boss (1975 film), a blaxploitation film
- The Boss, a 2005 short film starring Jennifer Sciole
- The Boss (2016 film), an American comedy starring Melissa McCarthy
- Sivaji: The Boss, a 2007 Indian film by S. Shankar

=== Music ===
==== Bands ====
- Boss (Australian band), a 1980s hard rock band
- The Boss (band), a South Korean boy band

==== Albums ====
- Boss (album), by Magik Markers, 2007
- The Boss (Diana Ross album), 1979
- The Boss (Jimmy Smith album), 1968
- The Boss (Timati album), 2009

==== Songs ====
- "Boss" (Fifth Harmony song), 2014
- "Boss" (Lil Pump song), 2017
- "Boss" (NCT U song), 2018
- "Boss", by the Carters from Everything Is Love, 2018
- "Boss" by Mirror, 2021
- "The Boss" (Diana Ross song), 1979
- "The Boss" (Rick Ross song), 2008
- "The Boss", by James Brown from the soundtrack Black Caesar, 1973
- "The Boss", by A. R. Rahman from the soundtrack Sivaji, 2007

=== Television ===
- Boss (TV series), a 2011 US series starring Kelsey Grammer
- The Boss (TV series) or The Peter Principle, a British television sitcom
- "Boss", an episode of Life's Work
- Bimorphic Organisational Systems Supervisor, a fictional supercomputer in the Doctor Who television serial The Green Death

=== Other uses in arts and entertainment ===
- Boss (video games), a particularly powerful enemy or opponent in a video game
- Boss Radio, a 1960s pop radio format
- Boss: Richard J. Daley of Chicago, a 1971 book by Mike Royko
- The Boss, a 1911 Broadway play by Edward Sheldon
- BOSS: Baap of Special Services, a 2019 web series

== Companies and brands ==
- Boss Audio, a company that manufactures audio equipment for automotive and marine applications
- Boss Corporation, a company that manufactures guitar accessories and audio equipment
- Hugo Boss, often stylised as BOSS, a German fashion house
- Boss Coffee, a brand of Japanese coffee-flavored beverages

== Occupations ==
- Supervisor, often referred to as boss
- Air boss, more formally, air officer, the person in charge of aircraft operations on an aircraft carrier
- Crime boss, the head of a criminal organization
- Fire boss, a person in charge of mine safety
- Pit boss, the person who looks after the employees who work in a casino pit
- Political boss, a person who controls a political region or constituency

== People ==
=== As a real name ===
- Boss (surname)
- Boss Mustapha (born 1956), Secretary of the Nigerian government from 2017 to 2023

=== As a nickname or stage name ===
==== Athletes ====
- Lance Armstrong ("Le Boss", born 1971), former professional cyclist
- Sasha Banks (born 1992), American professional wrestler
- Tomás Boy ("El Jefe", 1951–2022), Mexican professional football player and coach
- Bobby Lashley (born 1976), American professional wrestler
- Helmut Rahn ("Der Boss", 1929–2003), German football player
- Andrew Reynolds (skateboarder) (born 1978), American professional skateboarder
- George Steinbrenner (1930–2010), owner of the New York Yankees baseball team
- Jos Verstappen (born 1972), Dutch Formula One driver

==== Musicians ====
- Boss (rapper) (née Lichelle Laws, 1969–2024), American rapper
- Gene Ammons ("The Boss", 1925–1974), American jazz musician and songwriter
- Ross the Boss Friedman (born 1954), guitarist of The Dictators and Manowar
- Diana Ross ("The Boss", born 1944), American singer and actress
- Rick Ross ("The Boss", born 1976), American rapper
- Bruce Springsteen ("The Boss", born 1949), American singer and songwriter

==== Politicians ====
- Richard J. Daley (1902–1976), mayor of Chicago, Illinois, US
- Alexander Robey Shepherd (1835–1902), Washington, D.C.
- William M. Tweed (1823–1878), notoriously corrupt New York City politician

==== Other people ====
- Joe Lycett, English comedian, television presenter and painter who briefly changed his name to Hugo Boss
- Ernest Shackleton (1874–1922), Anglo-Irish explorer

=== As a ring name ===
- Ray Traylor (1963–2004), American professional wrestler, one of whose ring names was "The Boss"

== Places ==
- Boss, Missouri, US, an unincorporated community
- Boss, Texas, US, an unincorporated community
- Boss (crater), a lunar crater

== Politics ==
- Bureau of State Security (B.O.S.S.), a South African state security agency from 1966 to 1980
- Bosnian Party (BOSS), a political party in Bosnia and Herzegovina
- Bosniak-Serb Alliance (BOSS), a political party in Serbia

== Science and technology ==
=== Astronomy ===
- Boss General Catalogue, an early 20th century star catalog
- Baryon Oscillation Spectroscopic Survey
- BOSS Great Wall, the largest known galaxy wall
- Big Occultable Steerable Satellite, a system for observing distant planets

=== Electronics and computing ===
- BOSS (molecular mechanics) (Biochemical and Organic Simulation System), a molecular modeling program
- Balanced Optical SteadyShot, an image stabilization technology used in Sony video cameras
- Bharat Operating System Solutions, a Linux distribution developed by NRCFOSS/C-DAC, India
- "Boss", nickname of the robot that won the 2007 DARPA Grand Challenge
- Yahoo! Search BOSS, a web services platform initiative

=== Other uses in science and technology ===
- Boss (geology), a body of igneous rock
- Boss (engineering), term for a protrusion type feature
- BOSS (molecular mechanics) (Biochemical and Organic Simulation System), a molecular modeling program
- Bride of sevenless, a promoter for the sevenless gene
- Boss 302, a Ford Modular engine

== Sport ==
- A series of modified Ford engines used for NASCAR racing, including:
  - Ford Boss 302 engine
  - Boss 351
  - Boss 429
- BOSS GP, a European motor racing series

== Other uses ==
- Shield boss, the domed metal centre to a shield
- Boss, the hub of a propeller
- Boulder Outdoor Survival School (BOSS), in Boulder, Utah
- The Boss (roller coaster), at Six Flags St. Louis, Missouri

== See also ==
- Bos (disambiguation)
- Big Boss (disambiguation)
- Snoop Dogg ("The Boss Dogg", born 1971), American rapper and record producer
- Vic Sotto, Filipino television personality nicknamed "Bossing"
