= Bos (disambiguation) =

Bos is a genus of domestic cattle.

Bos, BOS, or BoS may also refer to:

== Places ==
- Boş (Hungarian: Bós), a village in Hunedoara, Hunedoara County, Romania
- Bos (river)
- Baku Olympic Stadium, Azerbaijan
- Bowen Orbital Spaceport, Abbot Point, Bowen, Queensland, Australia
- BOS, IATA location identifier for Logan International Airport, Boston, Massachusetts, USA
- BOS, Amtrak station code for South Station, Boston, Massachusetts, USA

== Companies and organizations ==
- BOS, ICAO airline designator for Level Airlines
- Band-operated schools, a type of school in Canada managed by a First Nations government
- Bilbao Orkestra Sinfonikoa, a symphony orchestra in Bilbao, Basque Country
- B.O.S. Better Online Solutions, an Israeli RFID company
- Board of Studies, NSW state education board, Australia
- Boeddhistische Omroep Stichting, a Dutch public broadcaster
- Borneo Orangutan Survival, foundation
- British Orthodontic Society

=== Fictional groups ===
- Brotherhood of Steel, a faction in the Fallout franchise

== Business and management ==
- Business operating system (management), a standard collection of business processes
- Business Operating System (software), a cross-platform operating system
- Behavioral Observation Scale, used for employee performance appraisal

== Other ==
- bos, the ISO 639 alpha-3 code for the Bosnian language
- Bos (film)
- Bos (surname)
- BOS Ice Tea, a South African brand of ice tea
- Background Oriented Schlieren, an optical flow visualization technique
- Balance of system, components of a photovoltaic system besides panels
- Basic oxygen steelmaking
- Batavian Eastern Railway Company (Dutch: Bataviasche Oosterspoorweg Maatschapij)
- BOS/360, operating system for System/360 computers developed by IBM
- Liebherr BOS series, type of offshore cranes

== See also ==
- Boss (disambiguation)
- Bo (disambiguation)
