= Hugo Boss (disambiguation) =

Hugo Boss is a German clothing company headquartered in Metzingen.

Hugo Boss may also refer to:

- Hugo Boss (businessman) (1885–1948), German businessman, founder of the Hugo Boss clothing company and supporting member of the Nazi Party
- Joe Lycett (born 1988), British comedian who briefly changed his name to Hugo Boss in 2020 in protest against the company

== See also ==
- Hugo Boss Prize, an art prize administered by the Guggenheim Foundation
- Hugo Boss Foursomes, a golfing pairs competition of the defunct Asian Matchplay Championship event
- Boss (disambiguation)
- Boss (surname)
