= Liebherr RL series =

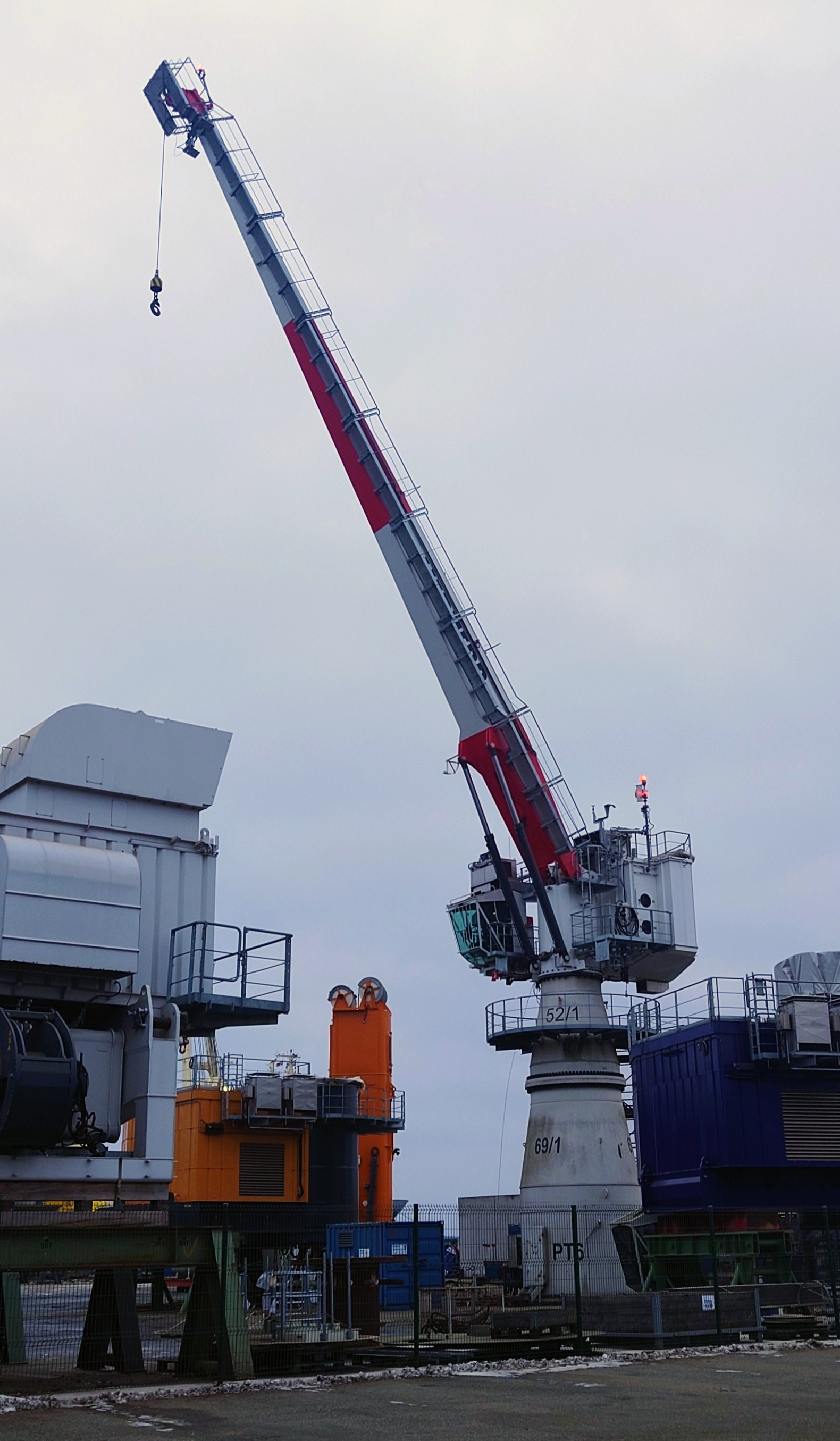
- Liebherr Ram luffing crane

Overview
- Manufacturer: Liebherr-Rostock GmbH
- Assembly: Rostock, Germany; Nenzing, Austria (formerly)

Powertrain
- Engine: electric motor
- Transmission: hydrostatic

Dimensions
- Length: 45–48 m (148–157 ft) (RL 2600)

The Liebherr RL series (short for Ram Luffing) is a family of offshore cranes manufactured by Liebherr-Rostock GmbH, a subsidiary of the Liebherr Group.

The crane family is designed primarily for maintenance and supply operations on offshore installations in the oil and gas industries and the offshore wind sector.

== History ==
Not much is known about the first cranes in the RL series. In 2015, the Liebherr plant in Nenzing sold its 1000th offshore crane, although this figure presumably includes both RL cranes and cranes from the BOS series.

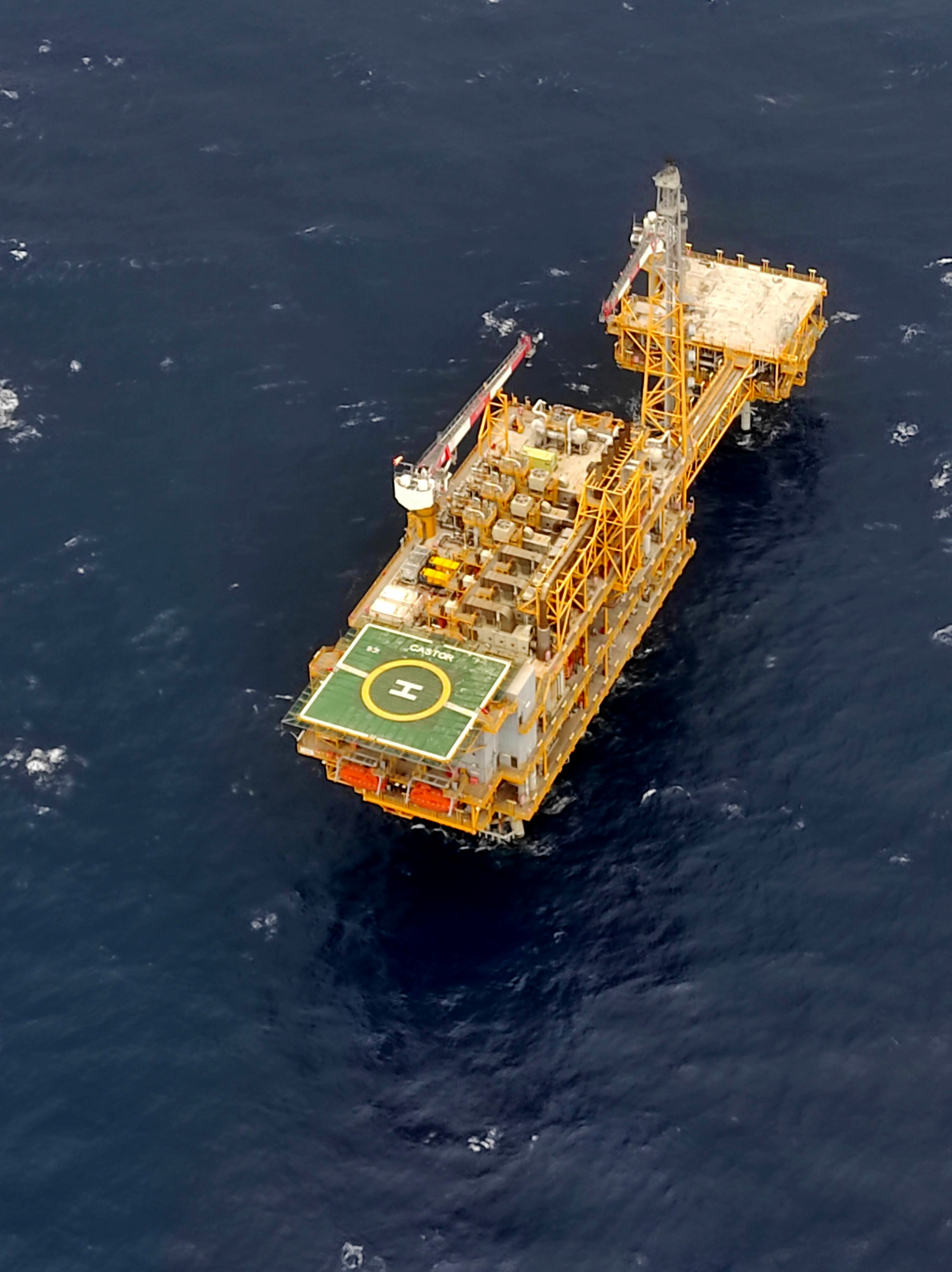
Two RL cranes installed on the former Castor platform on the coast of Vinaròs, Spain

The 1,000th crane and its sister units are three RL-K 4200s manufactured for TotalEnergies. They are equipped with a knuckle boom and were installed on the Egina floating production storage and offloading (FPSO) vessel. These three cranes are also the first ex-rated cranes of the series.

The RL-K 2600 is the third model of the RL-K subseries and was introduced in 2018.

== Design and engineering ==
=== Structural design ===
The RL series employs a ram luffing system with a box-boom and a compact structural design, which reduces weight and maintenance needs while maintaining lifting capability. They represent the most compact cranes in Liebherr’s offshore crane portfolio. Depending on the model, RL cranes have lifting capacities up to approximately 100 tonnes and boom configurations reaching around 58 metres in length.

=== Features ===
Standard features across the RL series include safety systems such as manual and automatic overload protection (AOPS), which are required by the european standard EN-13852. Some variants are certified for use in hazardous areas (ATEX and IECEx), meeting requirements for operation on oil and gas platforms.

Certain models of the series also support remote operation, reflecting demand for reduced personnel requirements on offshore installations.

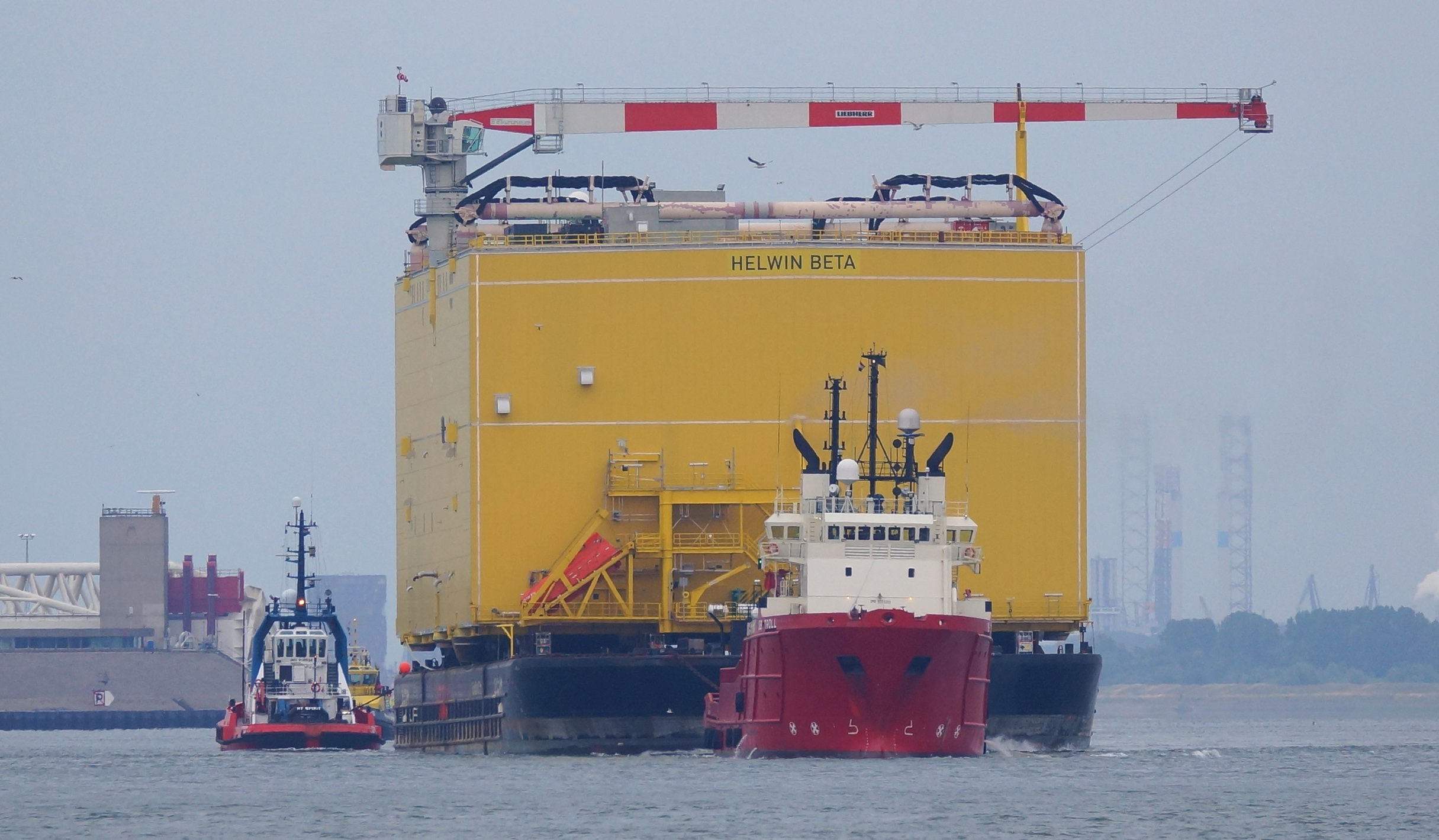
An RL crane installed on the HELWIN BETA platform of HVDC HelWin2

=== Representative models and technical data ===
The series includes multiple models differentiated by size and capability, such as RL 650, RL 900, RL 1500, RL 2600, and RL 4600, each with varying maximum outreach and lifting capacities to suit specific offshore tasks.

Model	Maximum lifting capacity	Maximum outreach
RL 650	30 t (30 long tons; 33 short tons)	30 m (98 ft)
RL 900	30 t (30 long tons; 33 short tons)	36 m (118 ft)
RL 1500	50 t (49 long tons; 55 short tons)	42 m (138 ft)
RL 2600	75 t (74 long tons; 83 short tons)	48 m (157 ft)
RL 4600	150 t (150 long tons; 170 short tons)	55 m (180 ft)

== Competition ==
The RL crane competes with other offshore cranes made by MacGregor, TTS NMF and Palfinger.

== See also ==
- HVDC DolWin2
