= Castle Gate Mine disaster =

1924 coal mine explosion in Utah, US

Coordinates: 39°43′57″N 110°51′03″W

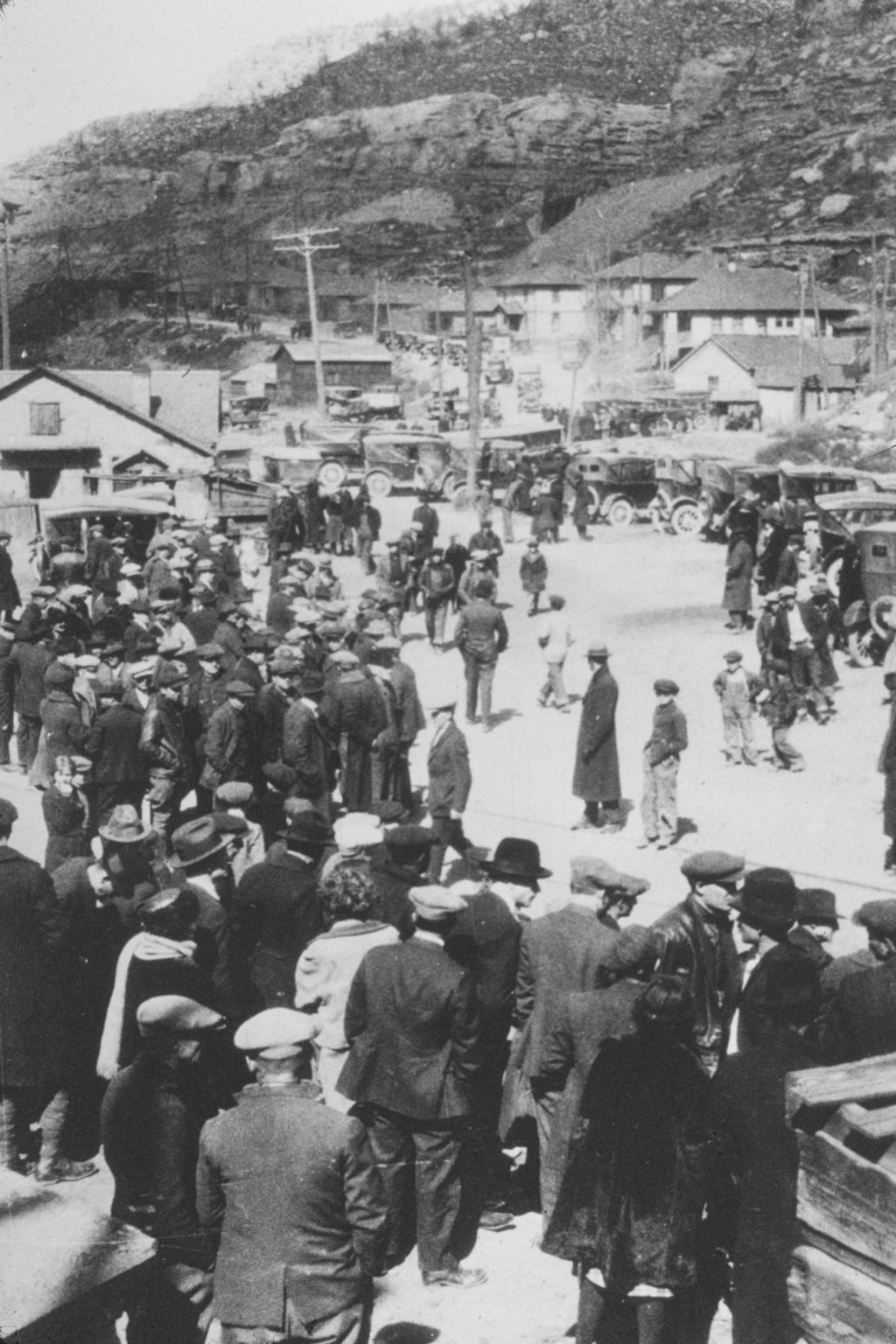
Groups of people gather at the scene of the disaster

The Castle Gate mine disaster occurred on March 8, 1924, in a coal mine near the town of Castle Gate, Utah (now dismantled), located approximately 90 miles (140 km) southeast of Salt Lake City. All of the 171 men working in the mine were killed in the series of three violent explosions. One worker, the leader of the rescue crew, died from carbon monoxide inhalation while attempting to reach the victims shortly after the explosion.

At least 24 out of the mine's 25 mules died in the explosion, along with an unknown number of horses and canaries. Additionally, rescuers commandeered about 20 of the community's pet birds to use as poison gas level detectors during the rescue and recovery efforts. They had an additional 30 canaries shipped in overnight. About 16 canaries died in the process.

== Explosions ==
The explosions were determined to have been caused by a failure to properly dampen coal dust in the mine during the previous shift. The first blast occurred between 8:00 a.m. and 8:15 a.m. in a chamber approximately 7,000 feet (2,100 m) from the entrance to the Utah Fuel Company's Castle Gate Mine #2. A fire boss in this chamber was investigating gas near the roof of the mine when his carbide lamp went out. The miner attempted to relight his lamp with a match that ignited the gas and coal dust, setting off a gigantic explosion.

The force of the explosion was powerful enough to launch a mining car, telephone poles, and other equipment across the canyon, a distance of nearly a mile from the entrance to the mine. The steel gates of the mine were ripped from their concrete foundations. Inside the mine, rails were twisted, roof supports were destroyed, afterdamp and coal dust filled the air, and the lamps of the surviving miners were blown out. As these men attempted to relight their lamps, a second explosion was sparked, killing the remainder of the workers in the mine. A third explosion occurred approximately 20 minutes later, causing a destructive cave-in.

== Aftermath ==
Recovery of the bodies took nine days. Identification of the victims was only possible, in some cases, by recognizing familiar articles of clothing. The remains of one miner were exhumed from the small cemetery near the mine entrance in order to rebury his body with his head, which was found some distance from the mine entrance subsequent to the hasty funeral service he had initially received.

The nationalities of the men killed in the explosion reflect the labor force of mining industry in the United States in the early 20th century: of the 171 fatalities, 50 were native-born Greeks, 25 were Italians, 32 English or Scots, 12 Welsh, four Japanese, and three Austrians (or South Slavs). The youngest victim was 15 years old and the oldest was 73.

Two weeks prior to the explosion, the Utah Fuel Company had laid off many of the unmarried miners and miners without dependents during a period of reduced orders for coal. As a result, 114 of the men who were killed in the disaster were married men, leaving behind 415 widows and fatherless children. The death benefits from the Utah State Workmen's Compensation Fund, established in 1917, provided $5,000 per dependent, paid out in $16 per week for six years. However, the Castle Gate Relief Fund, which had solicited funds from each county in Utah, continued to disburse benefits to some dependents as late as 1936.

== Conclusion ==
With this explosion, Carbon County, Utah had suffered both the worst and the third-worst mining disasters in the history of the mining industry in the United States to that point. The Castle Gate mine disaster currently ranks as the 10th worst mining disaster in United States history and the second worst mining disaster in the history of the state of Utah, following the Scofield Mine disaster of 1900, which killed 200 miners.
