= Sevan =

Sevan may refer to:

== Places ==
=== Armenia ===
- Sevan, Armenia, a town located near Lake Sevan in Armenia
- Lake Sevan, the largest lake in Armenia
- Sevan Island and Sevan Peninsula, a former island now a peninsula in Lake Sevan
- Sevan National Park, Armenia

=== Elsewhere ===
- Sevan, Iran, a village in East Azerbaijan Province, Iran

== People ==
=== Surname ===
- Benon Sevan (born 1937), Cypriot U.N. official
- Sevda Sevan (1945–2009), Armenian-Bulgarian writer and ambassador

=== Given name ===
- Sevan Kirder (born 1980), Swiss flautist
- Sevan Ross (born 1951), U.S. Buddhist
- Sevan Nişanyan (born 1956), Armenian-Turkish writer
- Sevan Bıçakçı (born 1965), Armenian-Turkish jeweller
- Sevan Malikyan (born 1972), British expressive artist of Armenian ancestry

== Other ==
- Battle of Sevan (924), battle in Armenia
- Sevan Marine, a Norwegian company that constructs, owns and operates floating offshore installations
- Sevan FC, Armenian football team

== See also ==
- Sevan khramulya, a species of fish found in Lake Sevan, Armenia
- Sevan trout an endemic fish to Lake Sevan, Armenia
- Sevan–Hrazdan Cascade, hydroelectric power station in Armenia
- Sevana (born 1991), Jamaican singer, actress, model
