= NMF =

NMF may refer to:

- Non-negative matrix factorization
- National Medical Fellowships, a nonprofit organization providing scholarships and awards to underrepresented minority medical students in the United States
- Natural moisturizing factor, a small molecules present in corneocyte cells
- Neuenfelder Maschinenfabrik, a German company for ship cranes
- N-Methylformamide
- New minor forcing, a contract bridge bidding convention
- Neural modeling fields, a mathematical framework for machine learning
- Green Warriors of Norway (Norwegian: Norges Miljøvernforbund), a Norwegian environmental NGO
- Nippon Music Foundation, an organisation to develop international networks of music and foster public interest in music in Japan
- Norman Music Festival, an annual three-day American music festival Norman, Oklahoma
- New Music Friday, also known as Global Release Day
