= Liebherr BOS series =

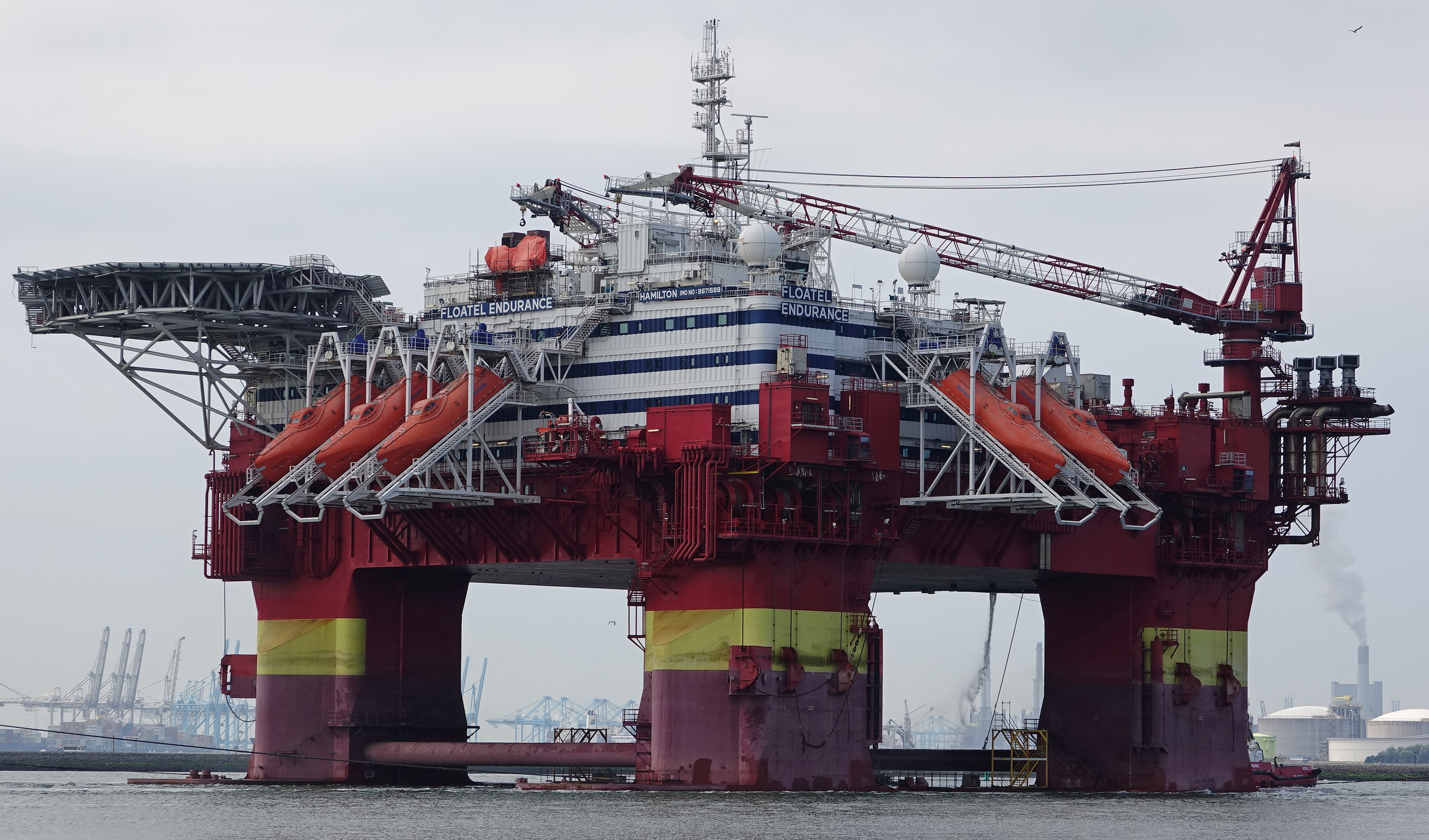
- Liebherr BOS crane (right) on the Floatel Endurance

Overview
- Manufacturer: Liebherr-Rostock GmbH
- Production: 1975 - present
- Assembly: Rostock, Germany; Nenzing, Austria (formerly)

Powertrain
- Engine: electric or diesel engine
- Transmission: hydrostatic

The Liebherr BOS series is a family of offshore cranes manufactured by Liebherr-Rostock GmbH, a subsidiary of the Liebherr Group.

The crane family is designed for heavy-lift, maintenance and supply operations on offshore installations and comes in electro-hydraulic, diesel-hydraulic or all-electric configurations.

== History ==
Liebherr delivered its first BOS crane B10/17 EX in 1975 for installation on the FPSO unit Princess Aweni.

In 2015, the Liebherr plant in Nenzing sold its 1,000th offshore crane. This figure includes both BOS cranes and RL cranes from the Liebherr RL series.

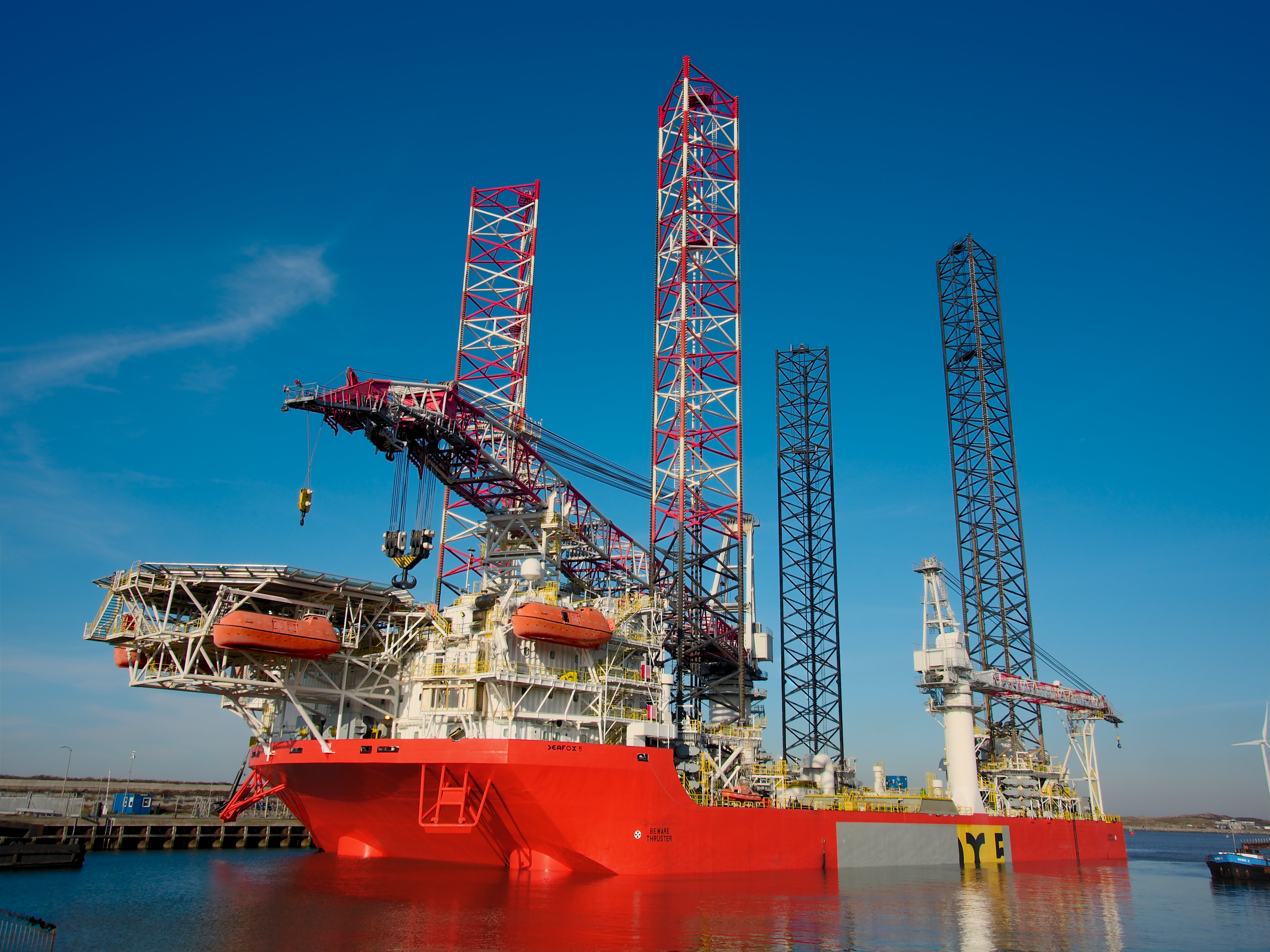
A BOS 45000 and BOS 4200 on the offshore support vessel Seafox 5 in IJmuiden, Netherlands

As of November 2025, a total of 502 BOS cranes had been produced and installed worldwide. The United Kingdom, Brazil, and Norway rank among the largest markets.

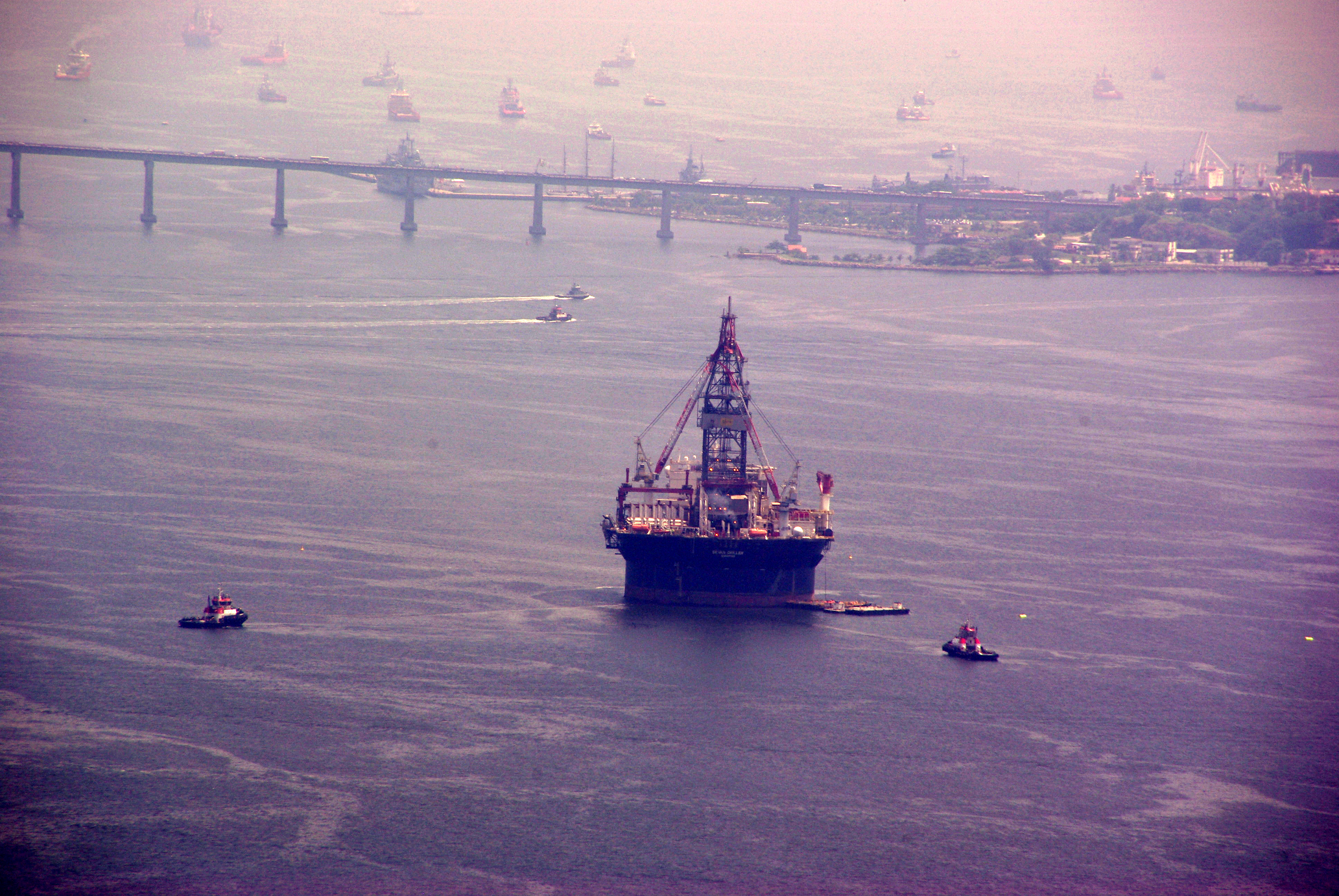
Two BOS cranes installed on the Sevan Driller of Sevan Marine in Rio de Janeiro, Brazil

== Design and engineering ==
=== Structural design ===
The BOS crane is a slew-bearing, rope-luffing crane equipped with a lattice boom. It is offered in a range of sizes, with lifting capacities of up to 1,400 t (1,400 long tons; 1,500 short tons). The crane can be fitted with a boom length of up to 102 metres, meeting the requirements for offshore wind farm installations.

Following a design revision in 2005, the BOS series adopted a configuration that Liebherr now regards as the industry standard; The update introduced a division between the A-frame and the machinery housing, replacing the earlier concept in which the drive system was integrated into the turntable with the A-frame mounted on top.

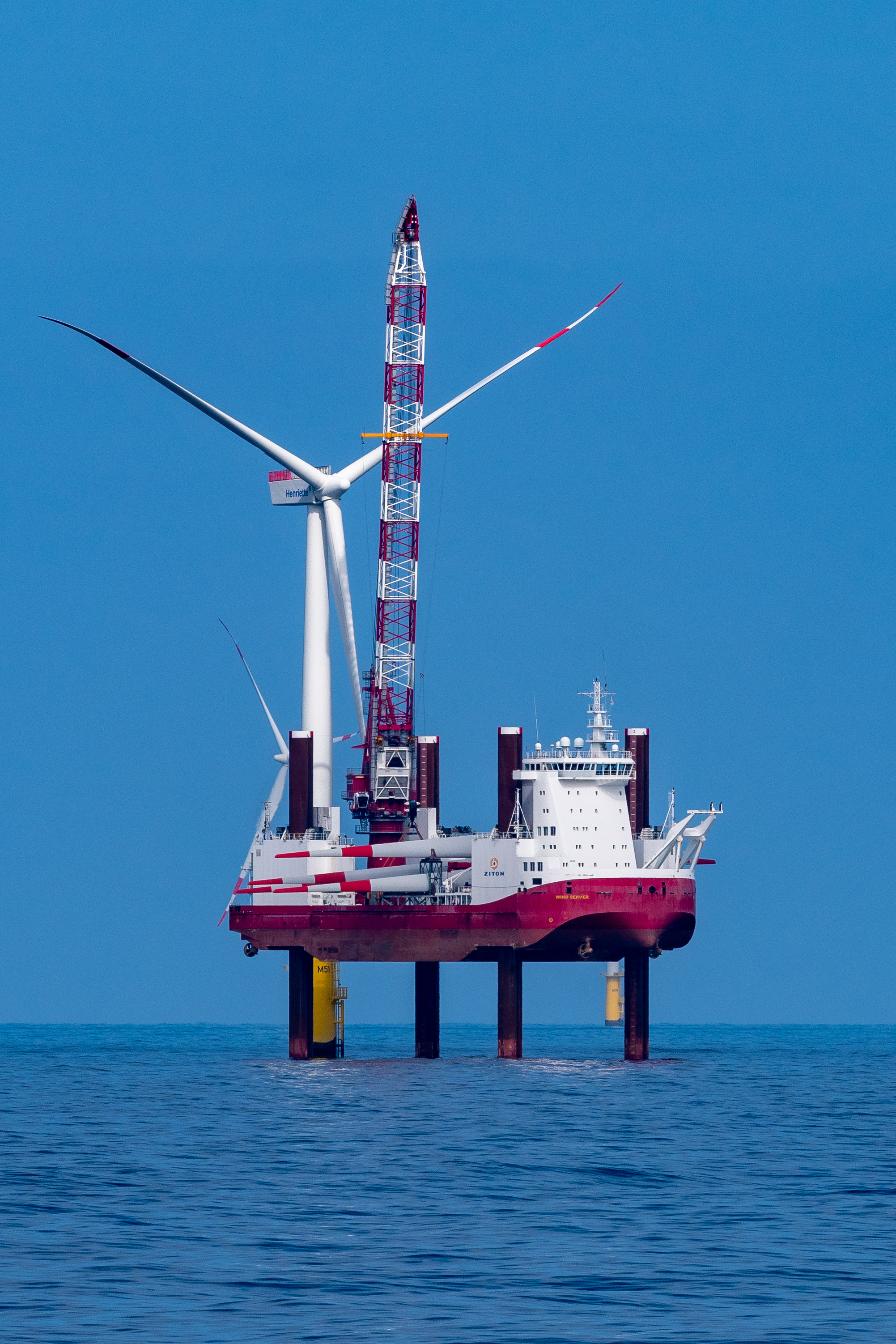
A BOS 14000 installed on the Wind Server, which is in operation at the Meerwind Offshore Wind Farm

=== Representative models and technical data ===
The series includes multiple models, which are differentiated by their boom length and lifting capacity. The number in the model name represents the overturning moment in ton-metres.

Model	Maximum lifting capacity	Maximum outreach
BOS 2600	75 t (74 long tons; 83 short tons)	57 m (187 ft)
BOS 4600	140 t (140 long tons; 150 short tons)	69 m (226 ft)
BOS 4600 E	100 t (98 long tons; 110 short tons)	69 m (226 ft)
BOS 7500	300 t (300 long tons; 330 short tons)	84 m (276 ft)
BOS 14000	600 t (590 long tons; 660 short tons)	102 m (335 ft)
BOS 35000	1,250 t (1,230 long tons; 1,380 short tons)	102 m (335 ft)
BOS 45000	1,400 t (1,400 long tons; 1,500 short tons)	102 m (335 ft)
