= Bostalsee =

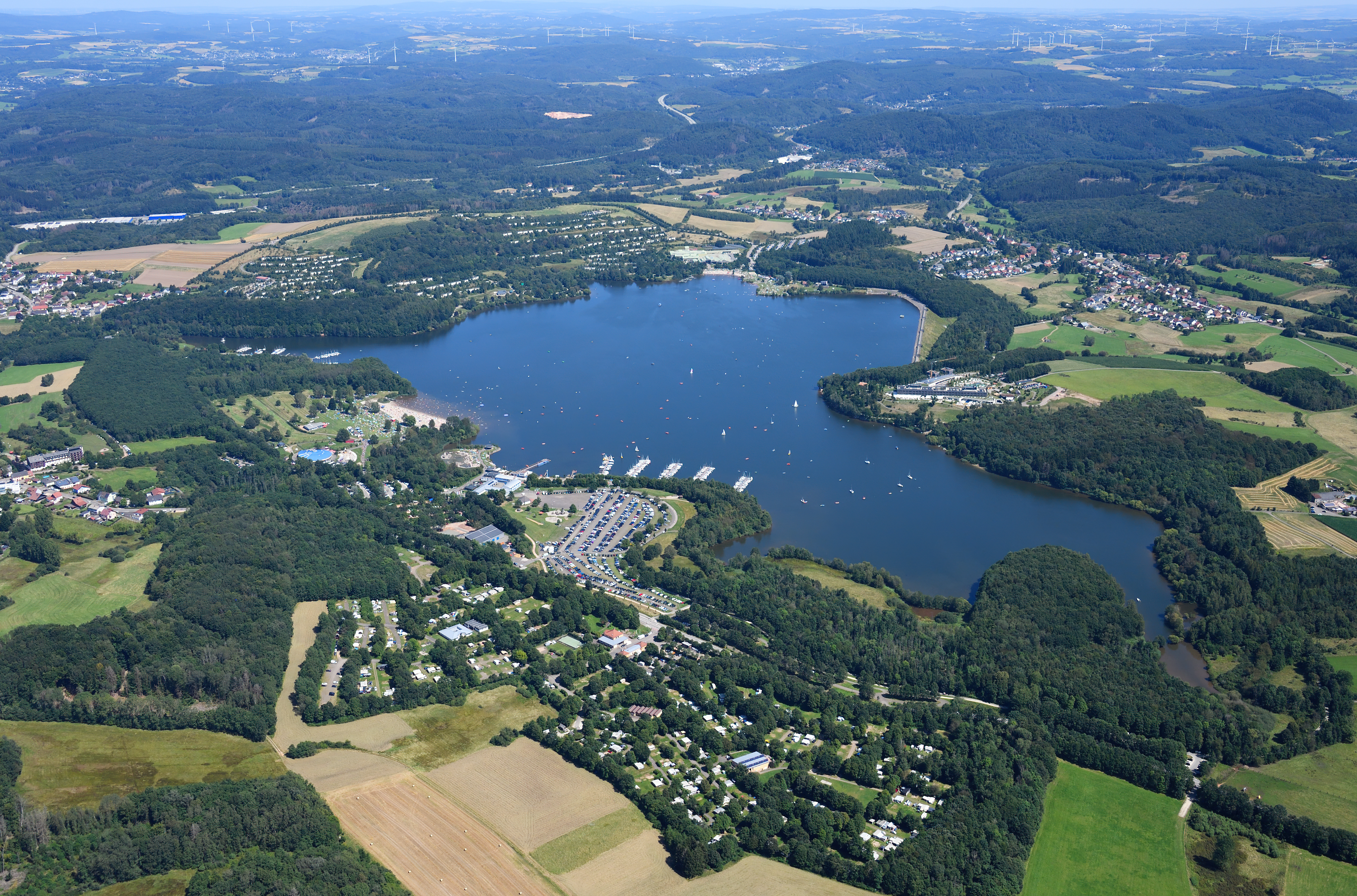

- Location within Saarland Location within Germany
- Interactive map of Bostalsee
- Location: Sankt Wendel
- Coordinates: 49.56833°N 7.07194°E
- Construction began: ca. 1973
- Opening date: ca. 1975

Dam and spillways
- Impounds: Bos, Dämelbach
- Height (foundation): 22.25 m
- Height (thalweg): ca. 20 m
- Length: 500 m (1,600 ft)
- Elevation at crest: 402.75 m
- Width (crest): 5 m
- Dam volume: 320,000 m^{3}
- Spillway capacity: 35 m^{3}/s

Reservoir
- Total capacity: 8 million m^{3}
- Catchment area: 12.2 km^{2}
- Surface area: 120 ha or 107 ha (long term)
- Normal elevation: 401.00 m or 400.00 m (long term)

The Bostalsee is a reservoir in the municipality of Nohfelden in the northern Saarland. It was created in 1979. The dam has a length of 500 metres. The lake is almost exclusively used for recreation. The hydropower from the stored water has been used since the end of 2013 to a small extent to generate electricity, especially to light the circular walk around the lake in winter. The southwestern part of the lake has been designated as a nature reserve.

== Construction ==
This major tourist project was initiated in the early 1970s by the head of the county council of St. Wendel, Werner Zeyer, who later became the minister president of the Saarland. The long term aim was to strengthen the tourist infrastructure in the county of St. Wendel in order to raise the number of tourists. In addition, the new waterbody was intended to extend the local recreation facilities and improve the ecology.

== Basic data ==
The lake has a surface area of 120 ha (1.2 km^{2}), a volume of 8 million m^{3} and maximum depth of 18 metres. It lies at a height of about 400 m above sea level (NN) within the Saar-Hunsrück Nature Park near 49°34′6″N 7°4′19″E. It is thus the largest artificial body of water used for recreation in southwest Germany. The lakeside villages are Bosen, Eckelhausen, Gonnesweiler and Neunkirchen/Nahe, and the Bostalsee Leisure Centre is run by the county. The dam impounds the waters of the Bos and the Dämelbach.

== Gallery ==
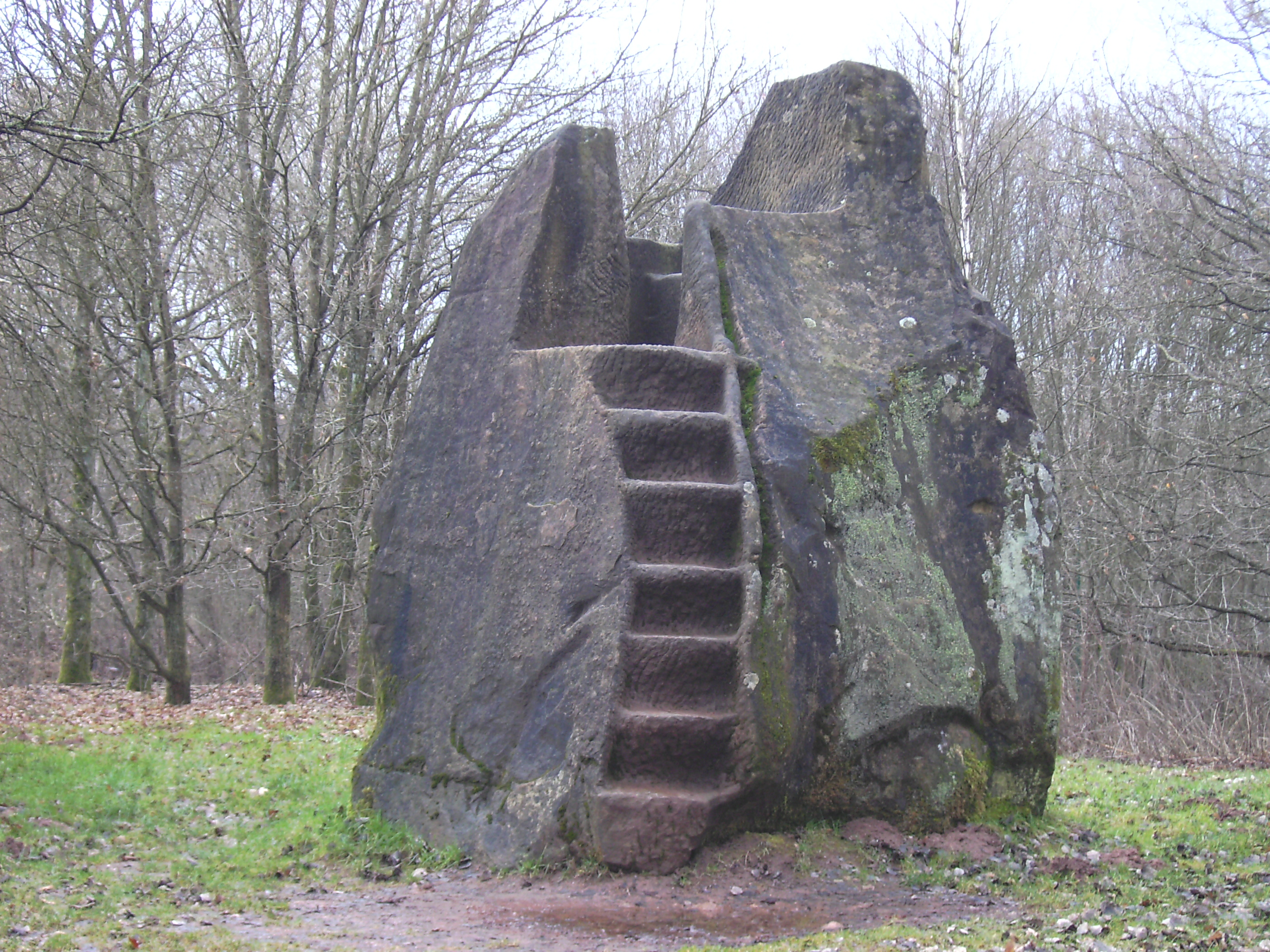
Leo Kornbrust: Liebesthron on the circular walk

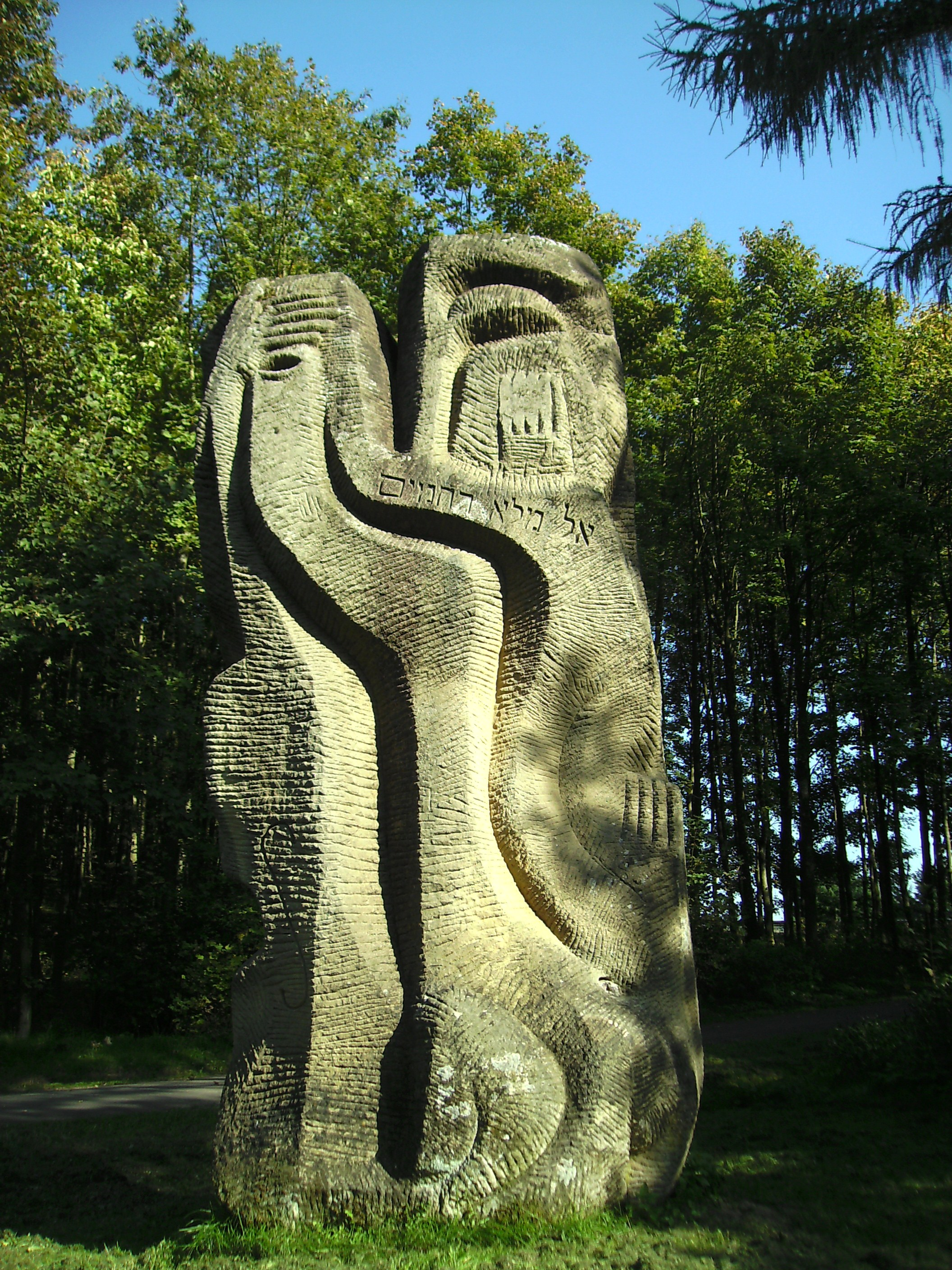
Stone sculpture on the circular walk Requiem für die Juden by Shlomo Selinger

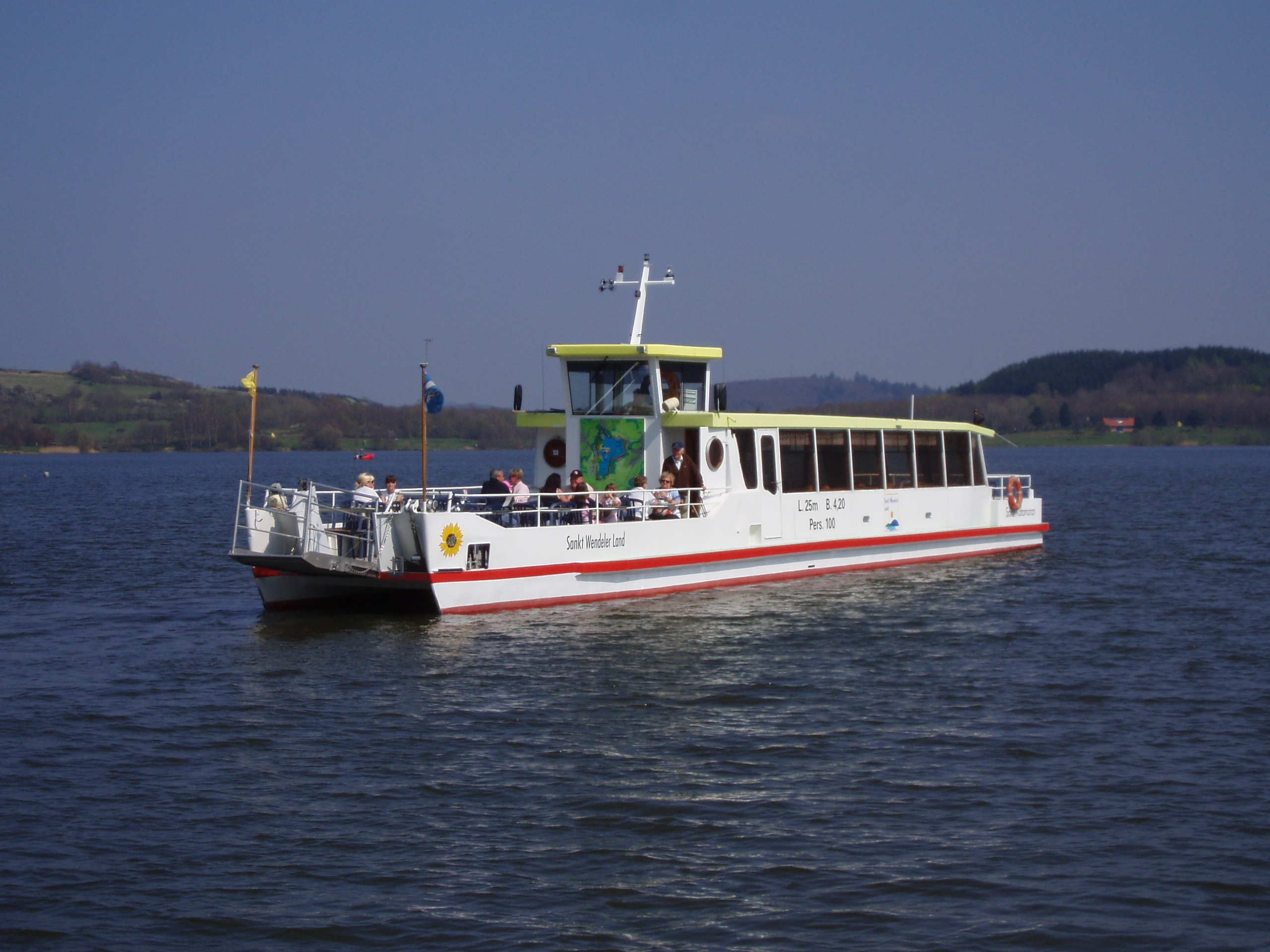
Former solar-powered catamaran (meanwhile there is a smaller passenger boat on the Bostalsee)

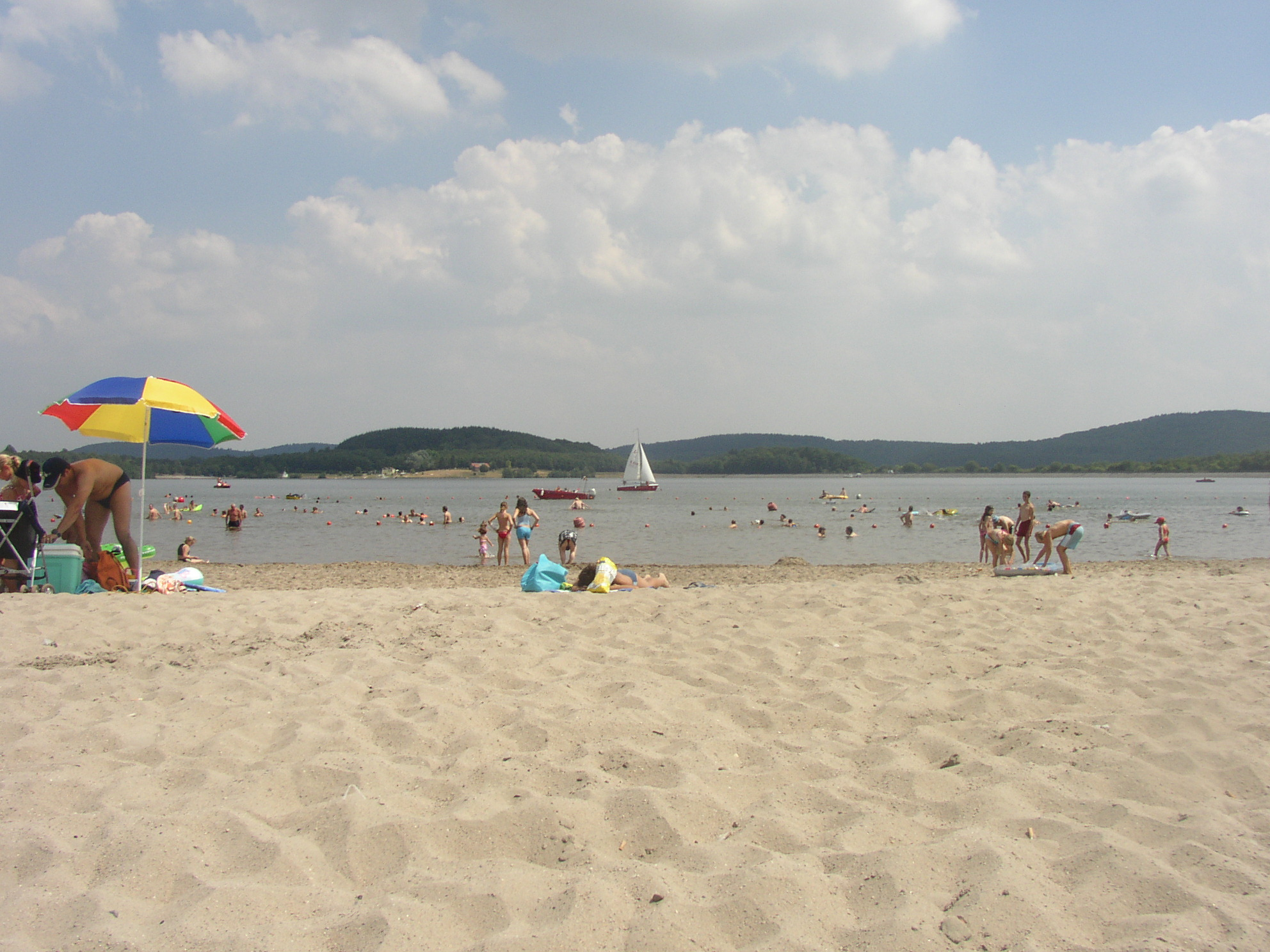
Beach on the Bostalsee

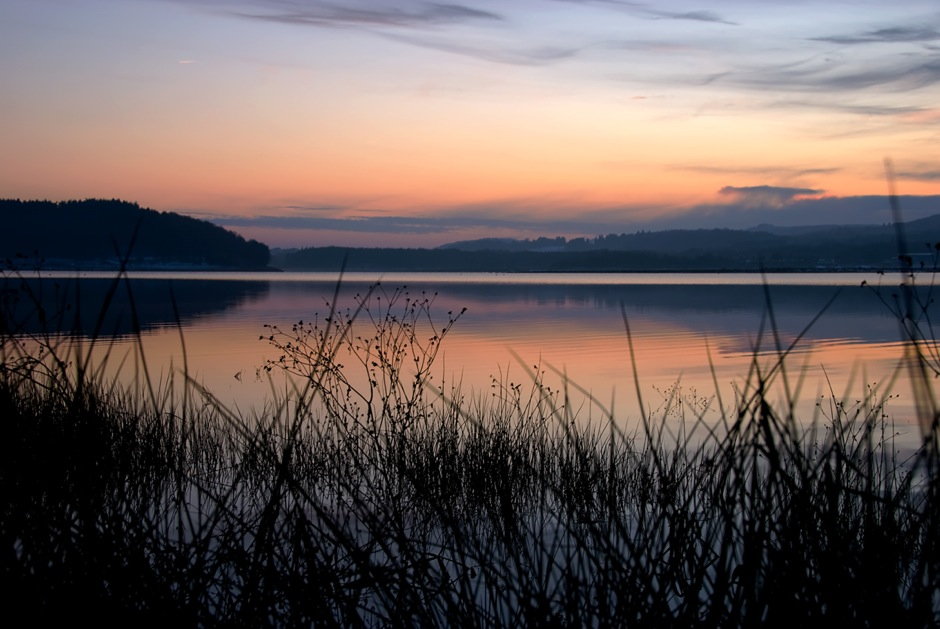
Dusk at the Bostalsee, 2008

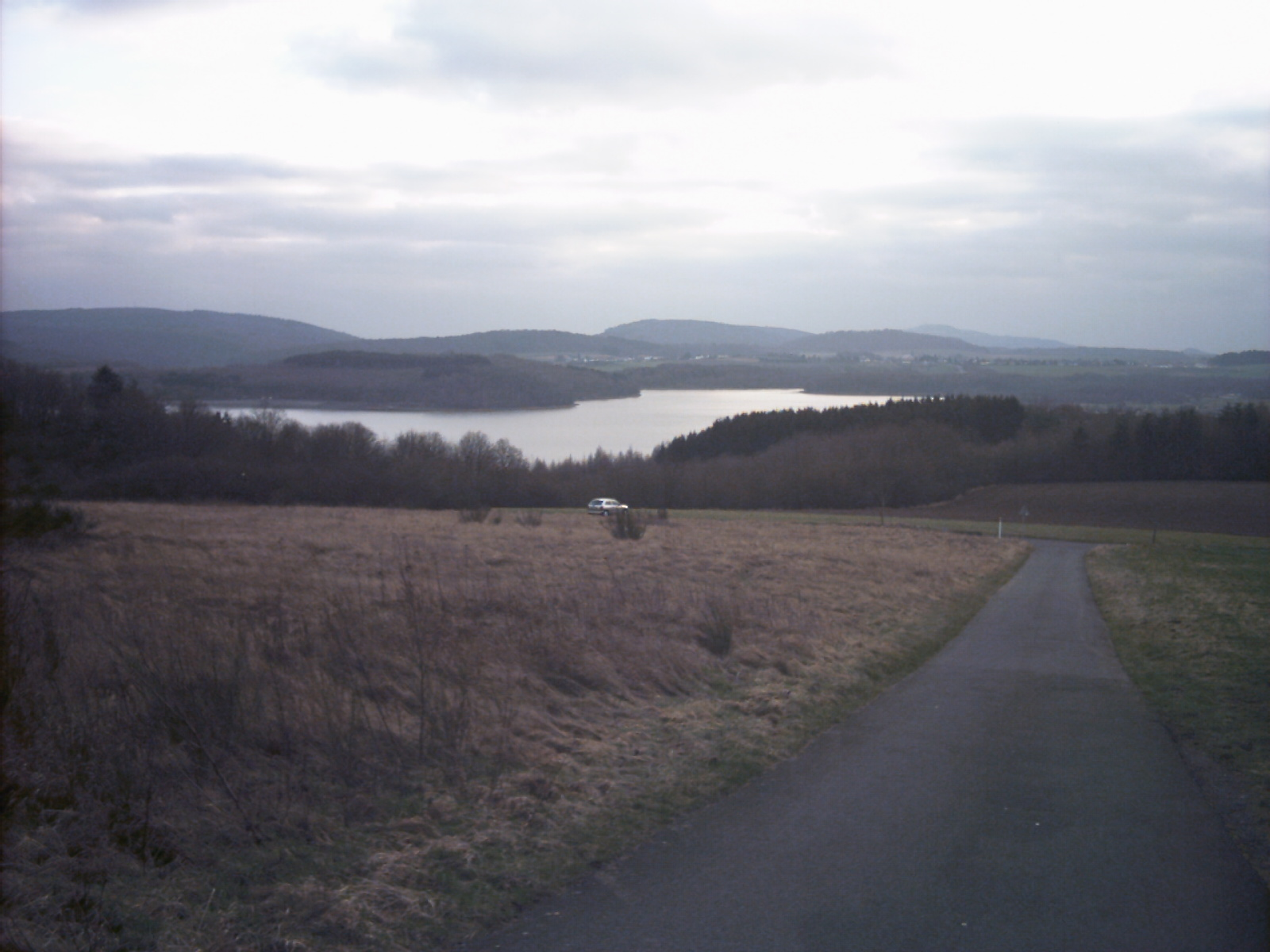
The Bostalsee seen from the north

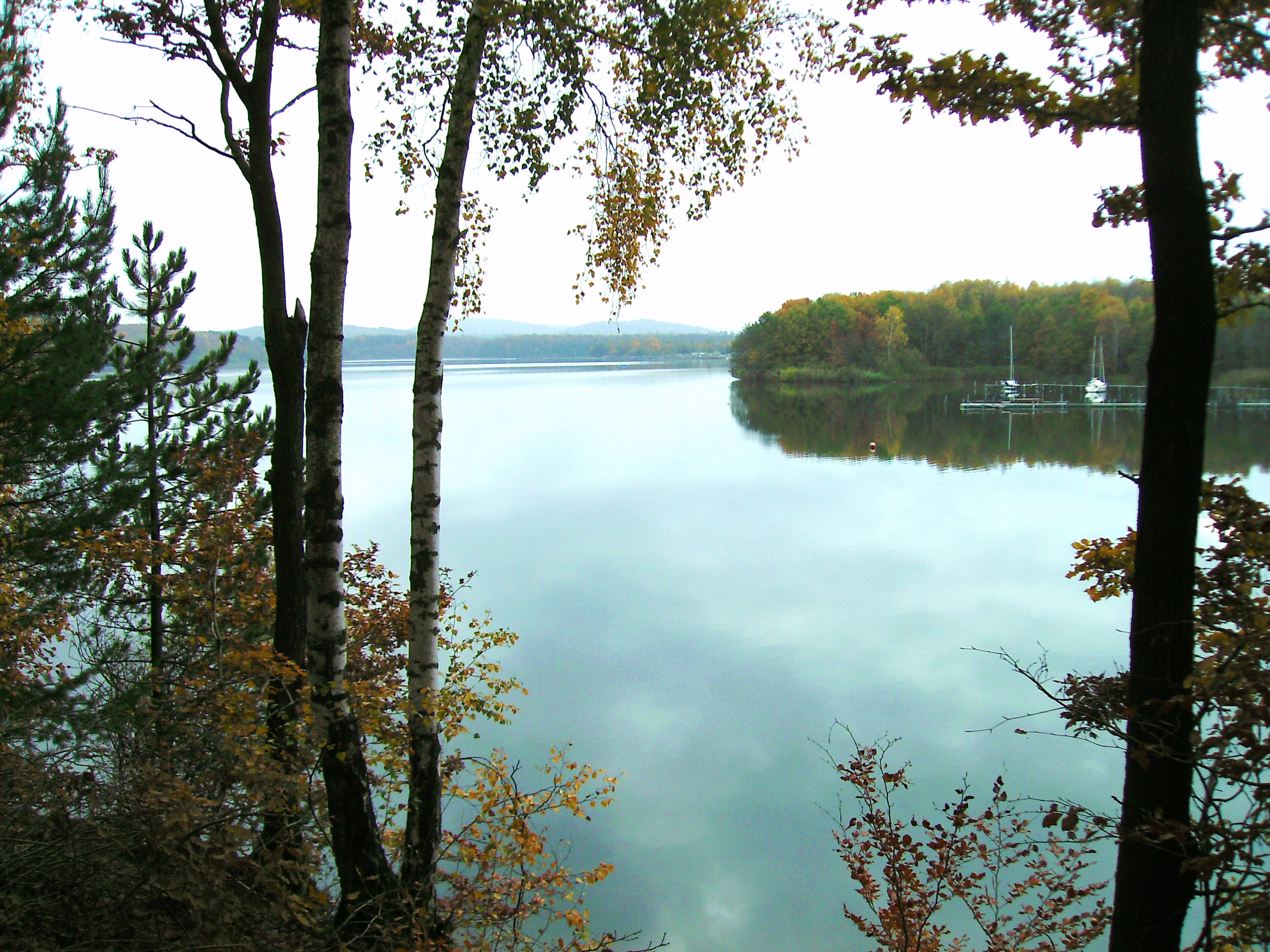
Northwestern shore and sailing boat base

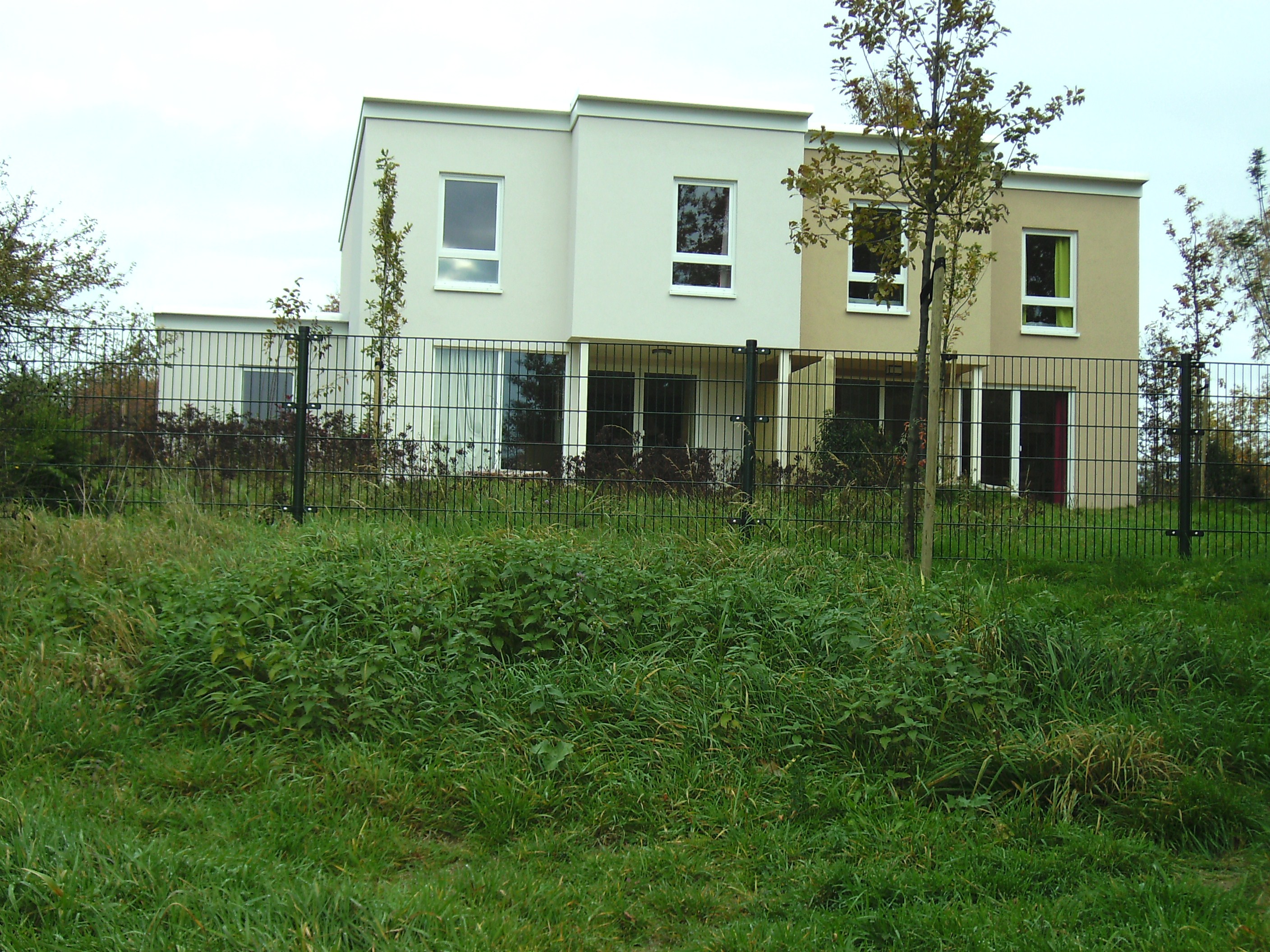
House in the holiday park

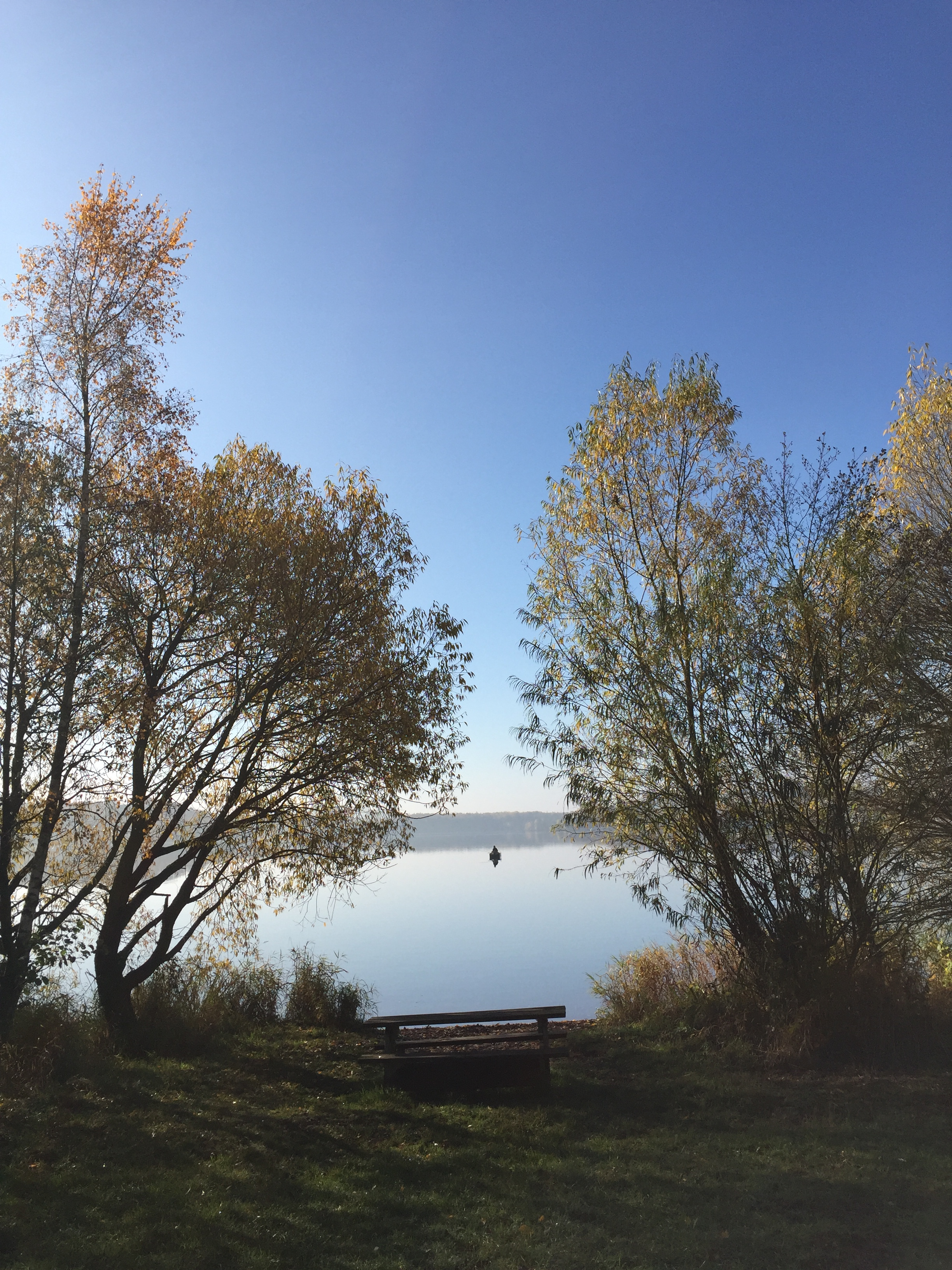
View of the lake

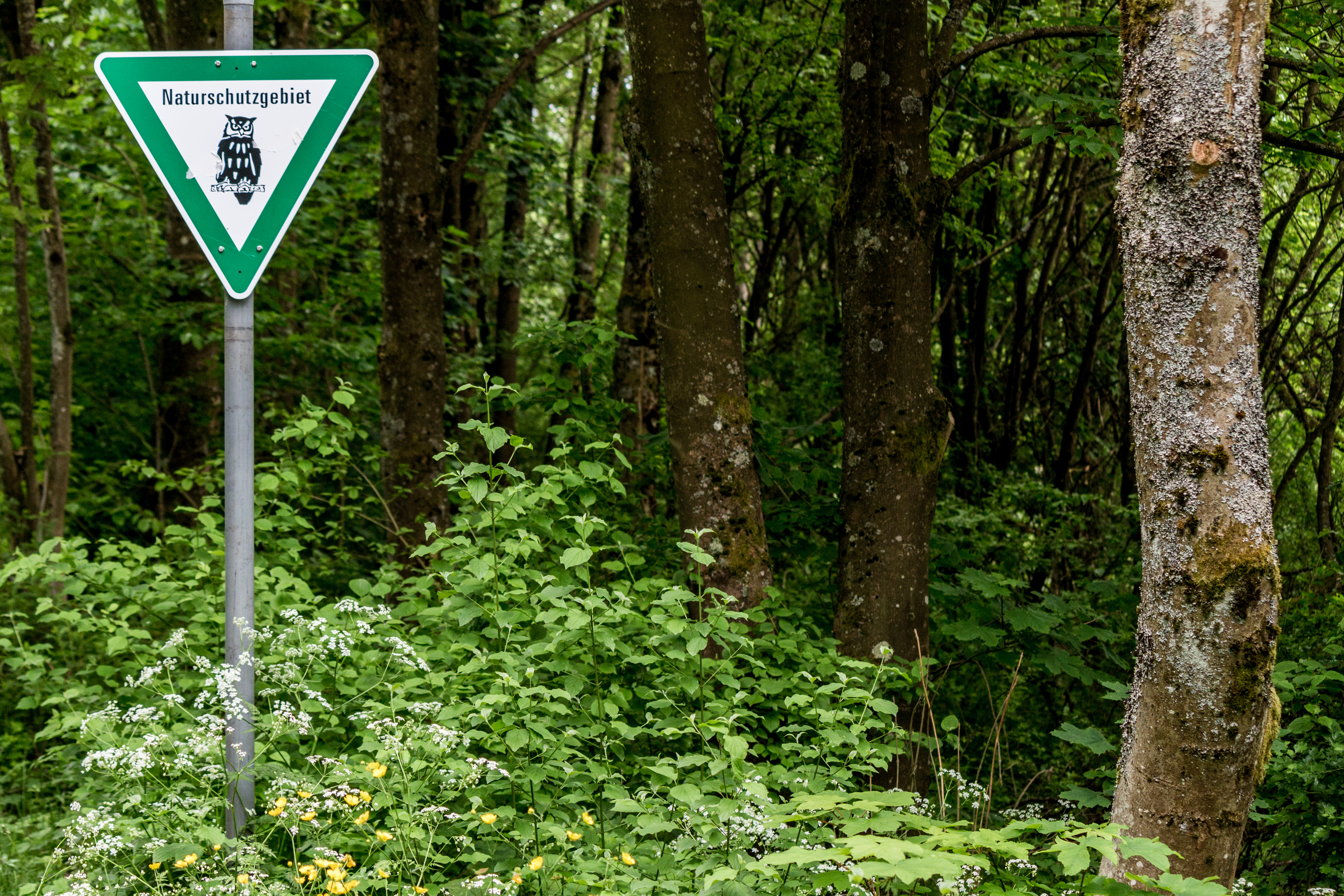
View of the nature reserve

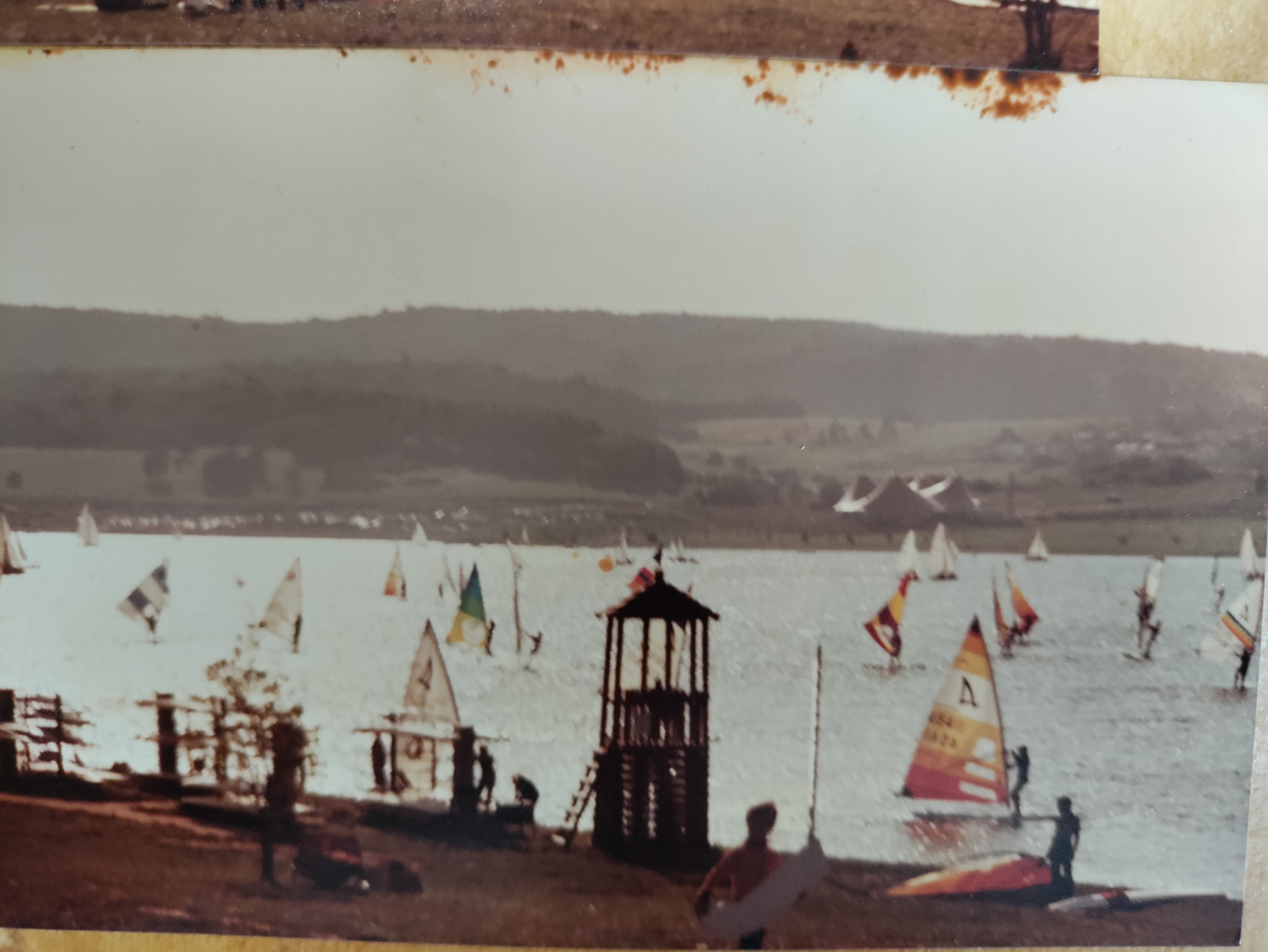
A busy Summer day in 1982.

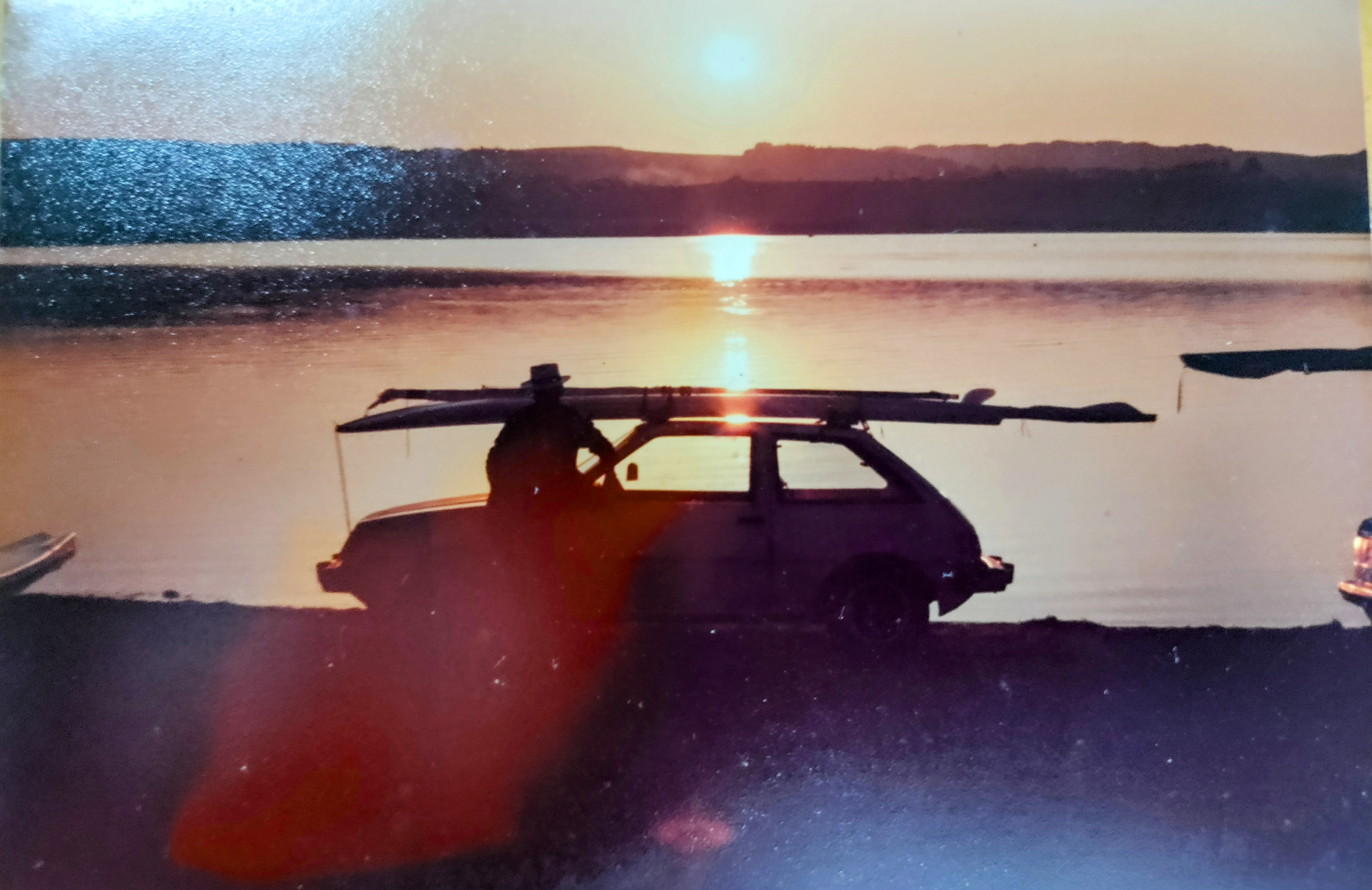
Sunset 1982.

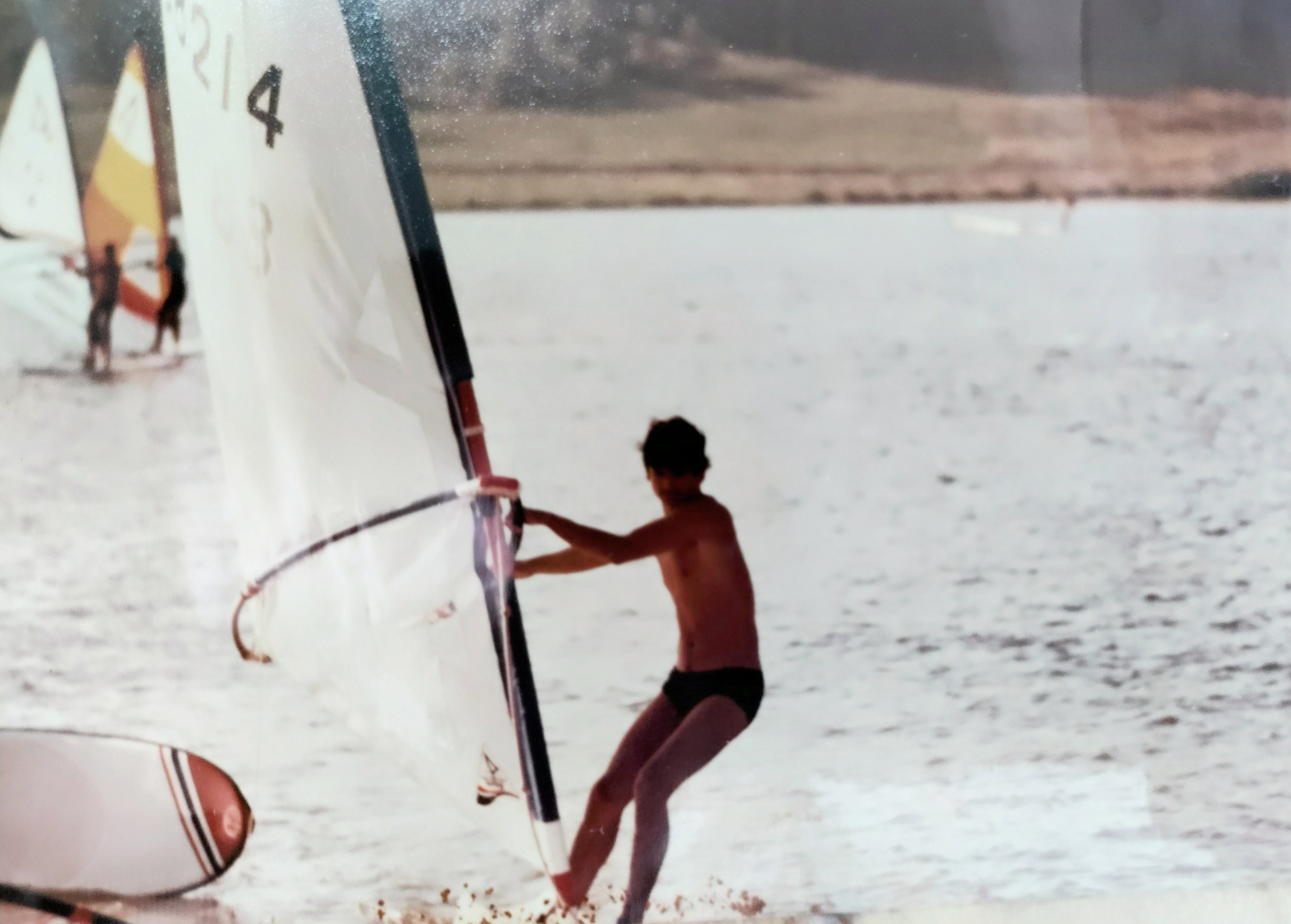
Windsurfing 1982.

== See also ==
- List of dams in Germany

== Literature ==
- Literatur zum Bostalsee in der SULB
