= Boss Audio =

American audio equipment manufacturer

BOSS Audio Systems
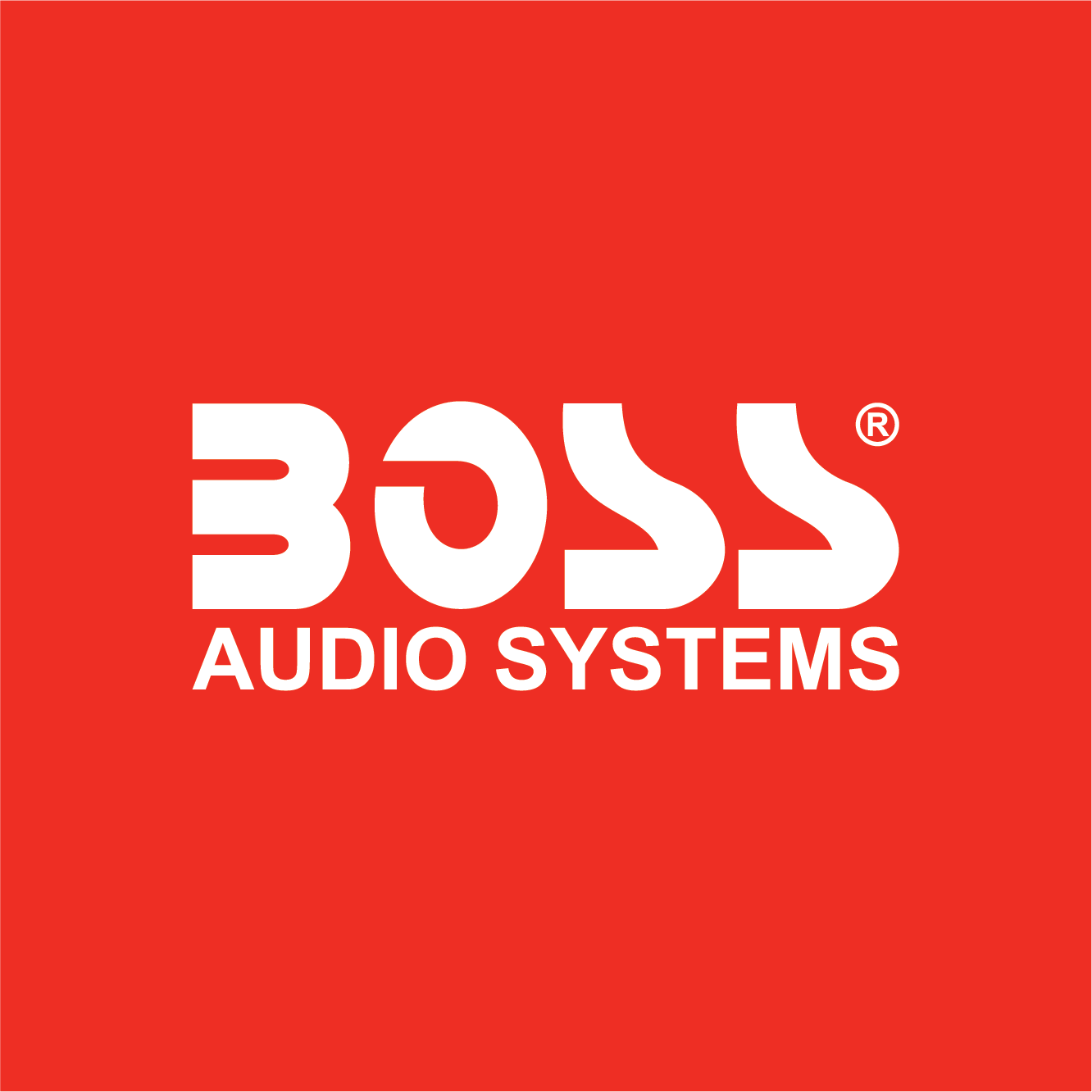
- Company type: Private
- Industry: Audio equipment
- Founded: 1987; 39 years ago
- Founder: Sam Rabbani
- Headquarters: Oxnard, California, United States
- Website: bossaudio.com

BOSS Audio Systems is an American manufacturer of audio and video equipment for automotive, power sport and marine applications.

The company was founded by Sam Rabbani in 1987.

BOSS Audio Systems mainly makes automotive and marine audio equipment.
