= Band-operated schools =

Band-operated schools (BOS) are a type of publicly-funded K-12 school in Canada that is under the jurisdiction of one or more of the First Nation band governments. It is considered a separate class of school than other types of public or private schools in Canada. These schools are funded at the federal level by the Government of Canada, but are managed by First Nation governments. They are usually physically located on Indian reserves in Canada. A 2017 publication stated that there were approximately 518 extant BOS in Canada at that time, and that approximately 61% of all children living on an Indian reserve received their education at a BOS.
