= Sevenless =

Gene in Drosophila eye development

Identifiers
- Organism: Drosophila melanogaster
- Symbol: sev
- UniProt: P13368
Search for
- Structures: Swiss-model
- Domains: InterPro

Sevenless (sev) is a gene in the fruit fly Drosophila melanogaster that encodes a receptor tyrosine kinase protein essential to the development of the R7 photoreceptor cells in the Drosophila embryonic eye. The Drosophila ommatidium contains 8 distinct retinula or R cells, each of which has a different spectral sensitivity. The R7 photo receptor, located in each of several ommatidia in the fly's compound eye, is used to detect ultraviolet light. The R8 photoreceptor contains an activator of the RTK (receptor tyrosine kinase) for on a precursor R7 cell, called the bride of sevenless (BOSS). The binding of BOSS to sevenless stimulates a complex series of reactions involving the RTK (sevenless), MAP kinases, Ras and many more molecules to differentiate that precursor R7 photo receptor to a fully functional R7 photo receptor that can see UV light. Much of this knowledge was gained by examining flies with a mutant sevenless which still produced a fully functional R7 photoreceptor when a dominant Ras was injected into the mutant R7 precursor.
