= Bos (river) =

River in Germany

Location
- Country: Germany
- State: Saarland

Physical characteristics
- Source
  - elevation: 490 m (1,610 ft)
- Mouth
  - location: Nahe
  - coordinates: 49.5644°N 7.0930°E
  - elevation: 379 m (1,243 ft)
- Length: 5.8 km (3.6 mi)
- Basin size: 12,634 km^{2} (4,878 sq mi)

Basin features
- Progression: Nahe→ Rhine→ North Sea

The Bos is a river of Saarland, Germany. It is a left-bank tributary of the Nahe, which joins in Gonnesweiler.

== Geography ==
The Bos rises on the Zallenberg at 490 metres (1,610 ft) above sea level. From there, the stream flows eastward. It passes the village of Bosen, part of Nohfelden, on the north and then, after about 3.4 kilometres (2.1 mi), it reaches the Bostalsee. Just before the reservoir it is joined by the right tributary Pärwiesbach which reaches it after flowing through Bosen. Its mouth is located about 300 metres (980 ft) south of the village of Eckelhausen, also part of Nohfelden. The outlet of the Bostalsee is located southwest of Gonnesweiler. South of the Bostalsee the Dämelbach flows into the Bos. After only about a further 1 kilometre (3,300 ft) the Bos joins the Nahe on the left at an elevation of 379 metres (1,243 ft) above sea level.

On its 5.8-kilometre-long (3.6 mi) course, the Bos drops 111 metres (364 ft), which corresponds to a mean bottom slope of 1.91%. It drains a 12,200 square kilometres (4,700 sq mi) drainage basin.

== Tributaries ==
- Jordanbach (right)
- Dumpfbach (right)
- Seifenbach (left)
- Letschbruchbach (left)
- Steinfloß (left)
- Parwiesbach (right)
- Altertbach (left)
- Sandbach (left)
- Trieschwiesbach (right)
- Dämelbach (right)
- Krämersbach (right)

== See also ==
- List of rivers of Saarland
