= Boss, Texas =

- Unincorporated community
- Location within Texas Location within the United States
- Coordinates: 32°33′20″N 97°30′29″W
- Country: United States
- State: Texas
- County: Tarrant
- Elevation: 840 ft (260 m)
- Time zone: UTC-6 (Central (CST))
  - Summer (DST): UTC-5 (CDT)
- Area codes: 682 & 817
- GNIS feature ID: 1378036

Boss is an unincorporated community in Tarrant County, Texas, United States.
