= Fire boss =

Person in charge of mine safety

A fire boss is a person employed at a mine or state certified official, responsible for examining a mine for dangers, particularly explosive, poisonous or suffocating gases. Usually the fire boss is the first person to enter a mine, to verify its safety, before a shift crew enters. It may also loosely refer to a foreman or shift manager for the miners.

== Origins ==
In the early days of mining the fire boss would wear thick clothing, usually soaked in water, and walk through the mine with a lit candle affixed to a long stick. If there were pockets of explosive gases the candle would ignite them, often not sparing the boss on the other end. Less dangerous methods are used today such as pumping air into the mine to dilute the levels of dangerous gases (see explosive limit).
