= Neuenfelder Maschinenfabrik =

Coordinates: 53.5322°N 9.7869°E

TTS NMF GmbH
- Company type: Shipyard
- Industry: Shipbuilding
- Predecessor: J.J Sietas KG Schiffswerft GmbH u. Co.
- Founded: 1968
- Successor: MacGregor
- Headquarters: Neuenfelder Fährdeich 120, Elbe, Neuenfelde, Germany, Cranz, Germany
- Number of locations: 1
- Area served: Hamburg
- Key people: Ralf Ressel; Andreas Harms; Rainer Twisterling (ex MacGregor)
- Products: Ship Cranes
- Services: Ship Construction
- Operating income: €10 - €50 million
- Number of employees: 149
- Website: https://www.macgregor.com/

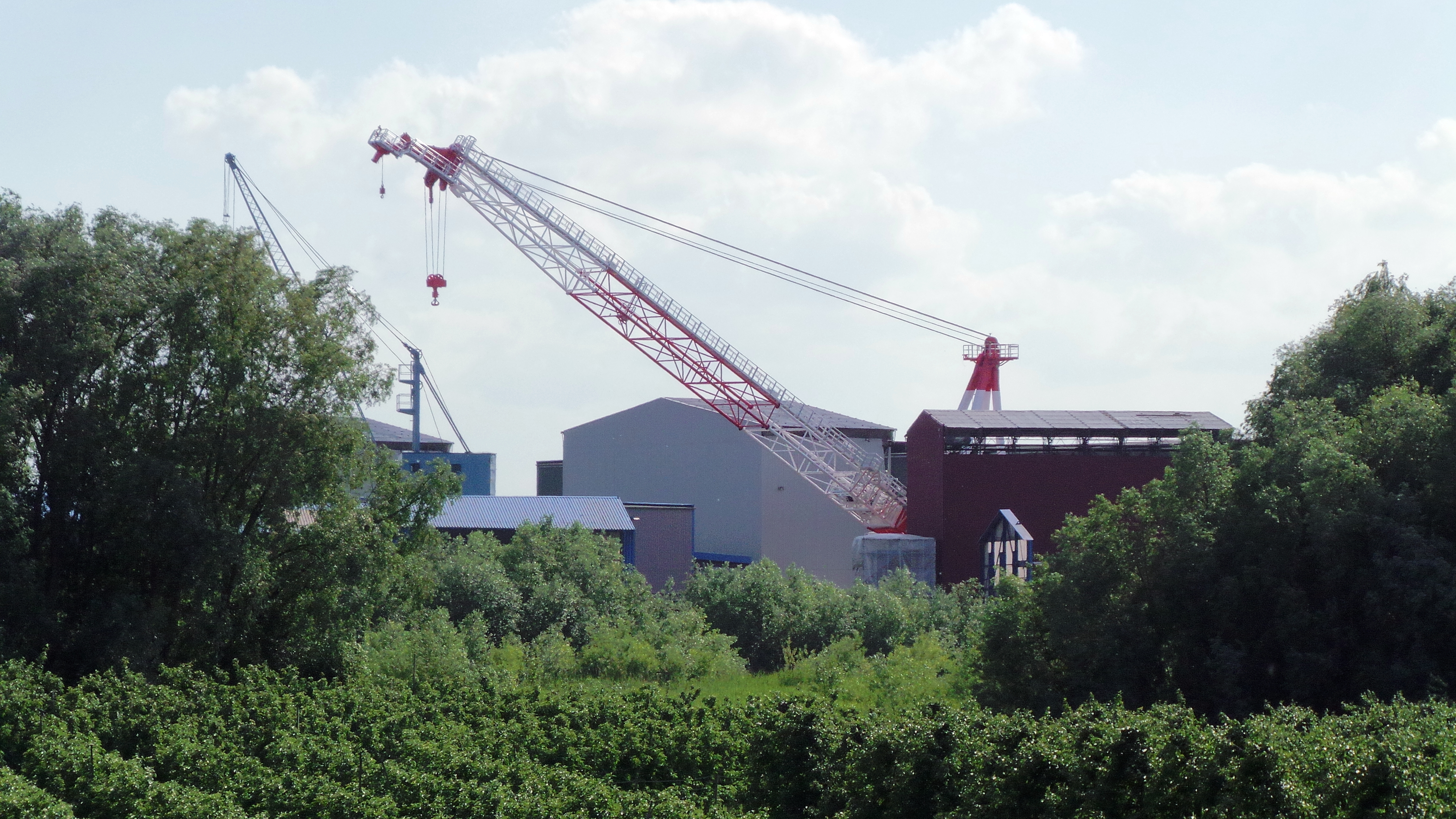
NMF Crane

The Neuenfelder Maschinenfabrik (NMF) is a German company for ship cranes in Neuenfelde, Cranz, Germany.

== History ==
The Neuenfelder Maschinenfabrik was founded in 1970 by J.J.Sietas as a separate company from the yard. Since then developed and produced ship cranes and hydraulic systems got individual clients, the company converted on a complete supplier, and the activities of the company from planning through design and manufacturing extended to the service. In addition to the production at the plant in Neuenfelde, since 2004, delivered cranes to China, mainly produced for the Asian market, but also for the European. In the course of insolvency of Yard, NMF was acquired by TTS in 2012.

== Cranes ==
Design features of the cranes of NMF were a splash proof closed crane housing in welded steel construction, in which all major units were housed. Many cranes offered the so-called 2-line operation on the hook every time a charge. This eliminated the change of shear. Due mostly two pump units and equipment with an auxiliary hoist, a certain reliability was ensured.

The most powerful ship crane was a type of DK SL Heavy Lift load capacity of up to 1000 t. These were also the strongest storm ship cranes in the world, only Huisman Equipment from the Netherlands manufactures powerful ship cranes, but based on a different concept.

== Literatur ==
- Michael Meyer: TTS NMF: Crane manufacturer sees itself well positioned. In: Daily Port Report of 9. Januar 2014, S. 15 (German)
