= Boss (surname) =

Boss is a surname of European origin, mainly Germanic.

In English Boss comes from the nickname for a hunchback, or bossu in Old French meaning ‘hunchbacked’ (a derivative of bosse ‘lump’, ‘hump’. From French it can also be compared to Bossard. In German it is from a short form of the personal name Borkhardt, a variant of Burkhart, and possibly a differed spelling of South German Bös. In Danish it is the medieval variant of the surname Buus.

Notable people with the surname include:

- Geoffrey Boss (born 1969), American professional racing driver
- Harley Boss (1908–1964), American baseball player and coach
- Hugo Boss (1885–1948), German fashion designer
- Isaac Boss (born 1980), Irish rugby union player
- Jeff Boss (born 1963), American conspiracy theorist
- Kevin Boss (born 1984), American football tight end
- Lewis Boss (1846–1912), American astronomer
- Marcellus Boss (1901–1967), American politician, 5th Civilian Governor of Guam
- Medard Boss (1903–1990), Swiss psychoanalytic psychiatrist
- Terry Boss (born 1981), Puerto Rican association football goalkeeper
- Stephen "tWitch" Boss (1982–2022), American actor
