= Sevan Marine =

Sevan Marine ASA
- Company type: Allmennaksjeselskap
- Traded as: OSE: SEVAN
- Industry: Petroleum
- Founded: 2001
- Headquarters: Arendal, Norway
- Area served: Global
- Key people: Reese McNeel (CEO)
- Products: FPSOs and drilling rigs
- Website: www.sevanmarine.com

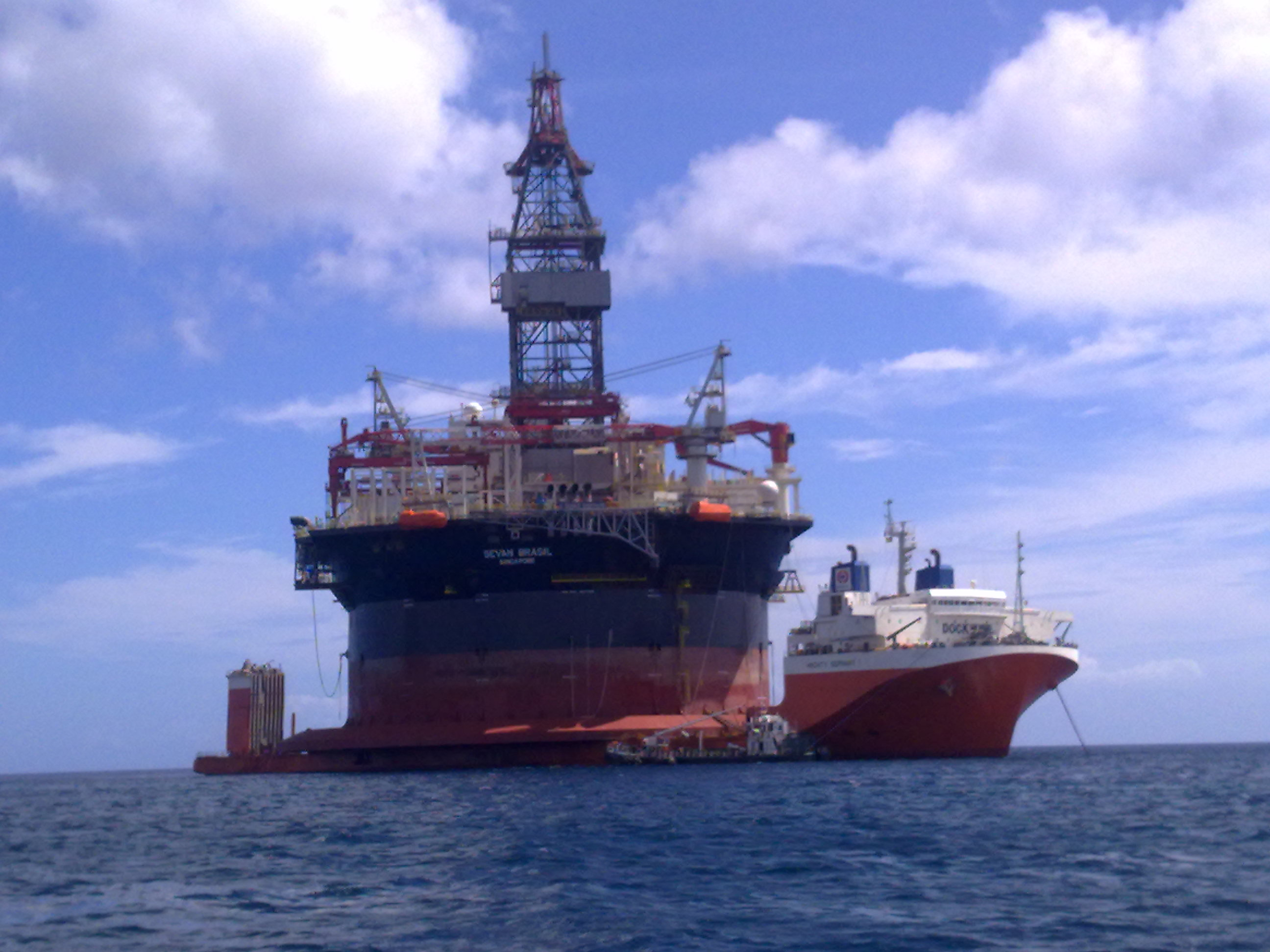
Sevan Brasil off the coast of Port Louis, Mauritius

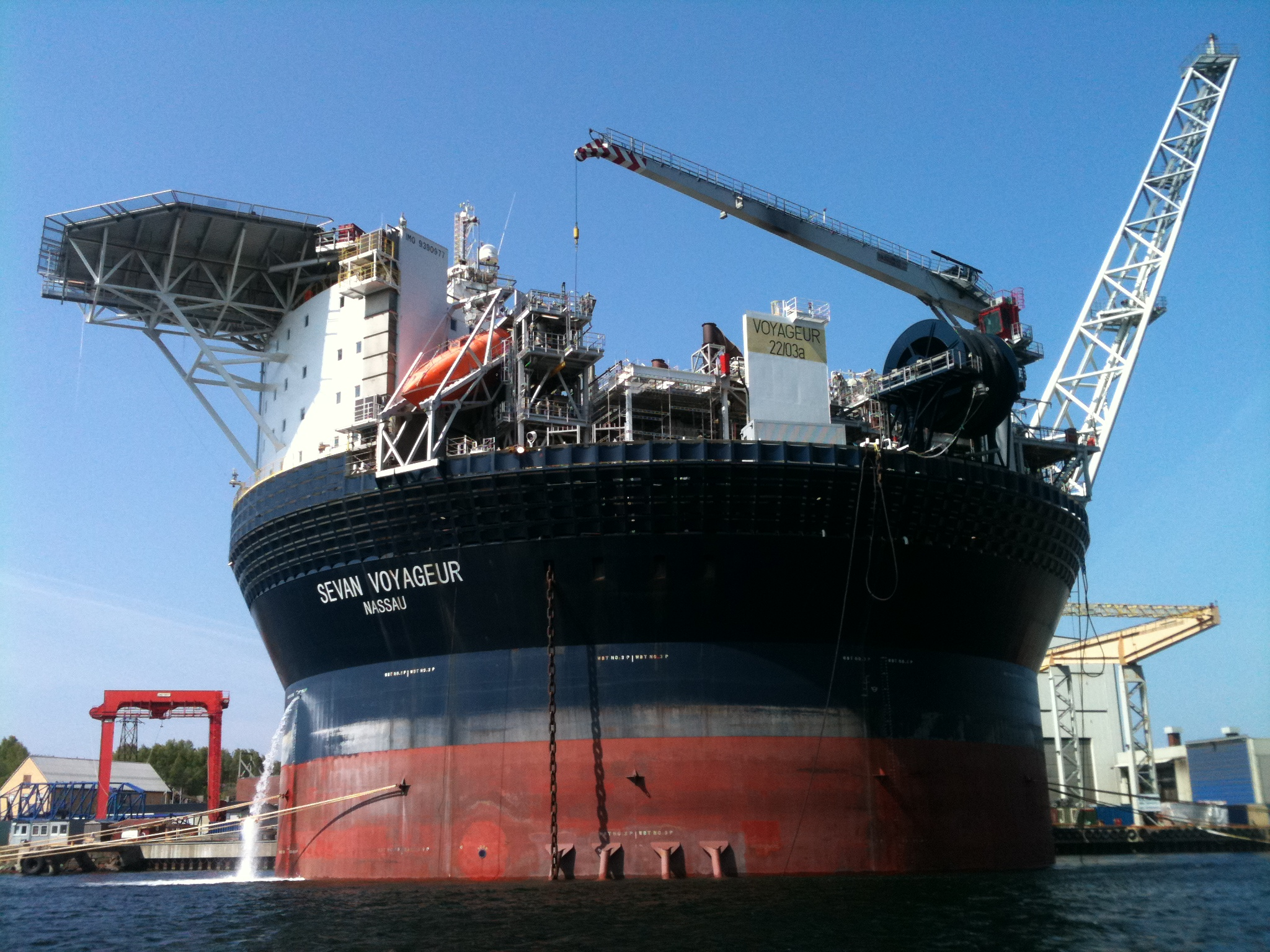
The circular FPSO model 300 Sevan Voyageur moored at Nymo yard at Eydehavn, Norway.

Sevan Marine ASA is specializing in design, engineering and project execution of floating units for offshore applications. The main product is cylinder platforms used for floating production and drilling.

The company is based in Arendal but also has office in Oslo and Singapore. Sevan Marine ASA is listed on Oslo Børs with ticker SEVAN.
