= Rally Mexico =

Rallying event held in Guanajuato, Mexico

- Status: Active
- Genre: Motorsporting event
- Frequency: Annual
- Country: Mexico
- Inaugurated: 1979

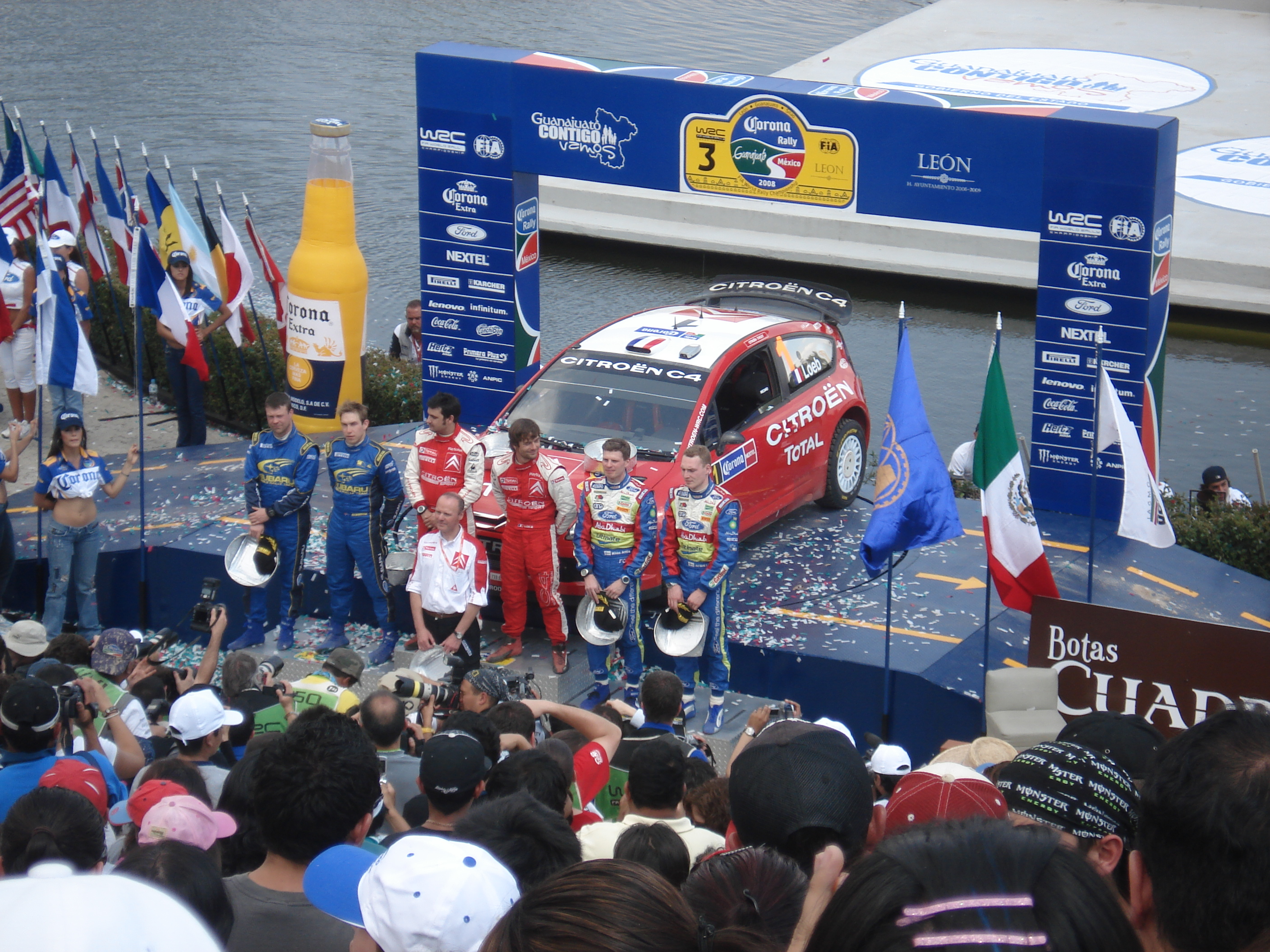
2008 Rally Mexico podium ceremony with Loeb, Atkinson and Latvala.

Rally Mexico, formerly known as Rally America is a round of the FIA World Rally Championship. The rally entered the championship schedule in the 2004 season. The event's itinerary is based in the state of Guanajuato. The stages take place in the environs of cities of León, Silao, and Guanajuato; rally headquarters being located in León.

Rally México features the highest stages of all WRC championship rounds, as high as 2700 meters; engines in WRC cars lose up to 20% of their power in these stages as a result, due to the lower air pressure at such altitudes.

In 2004, the Organising Committee won the Inmarsat Star of the Rally award for his first organized WRC rally. In 2008, the Organising Committee of the Corona Rally Mexico won the Abu Dhabi Spirit of the Rally award for the great work done in the organization of the WRC event.

== History ==
Rally America, later known as Corona Rally Mexico and now Rally Guanajuato Mexico, was created in 1979 through a big spirit of co-operation by the two largest clubs in Mexico: Club Automovilístico Francés de México (CAF) and the Rally Automovil Club (RAC). Both clubs have a long history of sporting competition, so their collaboration was a big step forward for rallying in the country. It was originally hosted in the State of Mexico and ran continuously until 1985.

After an absence of six years, the event ran again in 1991 and followed the route of El Paso de Cortés, between two of Mexico's largest volcanoes. Following the cancellation of the 1992 edition of the event, the CAF opted for a different concept: a short rally with a high percentage of special stages. The result was the very successful 1993 edition that was held in Valle de Bravo under the direction of Gilles Spitalier. The rally was awarded the Rally of the Year title by the Mexican National Rally Commission.

The Organising Committee then took over the running of the Rally de las 24 Horas, the CAF's flagship event, and, for this reason, Rally America was not staged again until 1996, when the internationalization of the project began.

The CAF and its new promoting partner, Rallymex (Suberville Bros. and Spitalier), moved the event to the US border in Ensenada, Baja California, for two years, where it started to attract international entries.

In 1998, the organizers decided to rename the event and move it to Leon, Guanajuato. With a long-term business plan focusing on inclusion in the World Rally Championship in place, the event ran again in 1999 and 2000, stepping up a gear each year. From 2001 to 2003, the organizers went for observation by the FIA, successfully running the event on each occasion.

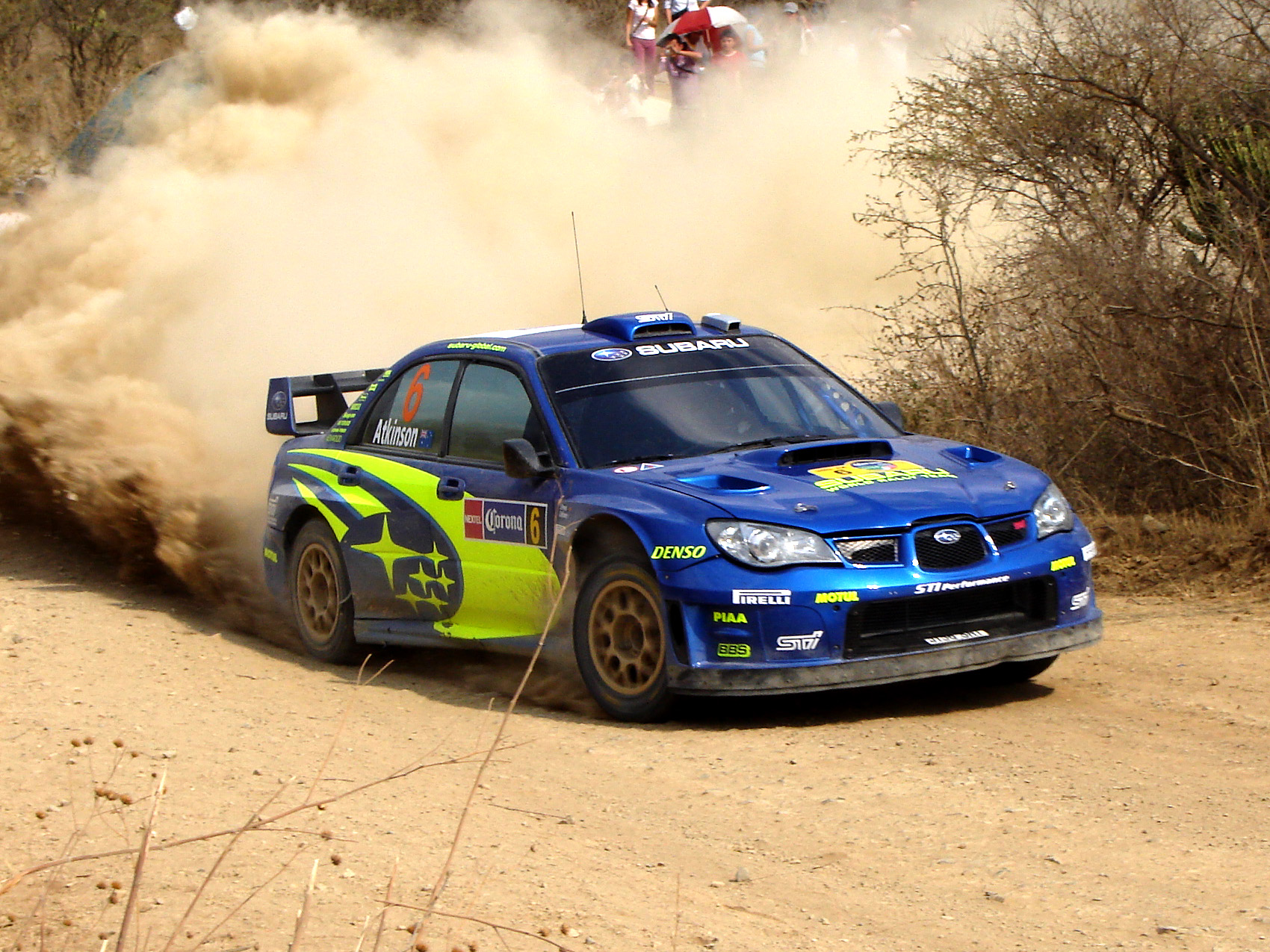
Chris Atkinson with a Subaru Impreza WRC at the 2008 event.

The 2003 Corona Rally Mexico – the 17th in the history of the rally – proved to be the crucial turning point. New facilities at the Poliforum Expo Center were groundbreaking in the sport and this, combined with one of the most compact routes ever, put the event firmly in the frame for World Championship status. A total of 45 crews representing 11 countries crossed the start ramp in Guanajuato during one of the most spectacular opening ceremonies seen in the sport.

Corona Rally Mexico made its debut in the expanded 16-round World Rally Championship in the 2004 season, running successfully as the third round of the series and implementing a raft of regulation changes introduced by the FIA for the season. In 2005, the event again ran as the third round and was the first full gravel event of the year, attracting 44 crews representing 17 nations. For the first time in their series, the FIA Junior World Rally Championship contenders also ventured outside Europe, Corona Rally Mexico being the second event in its eight-round series.

For the 2007 edition, 21º Corona Rally México, the route was re-designed, making it more compact for a total of 850 kilometers. An all-time record for the championship. The rally was also made the centrepiece conclusion of the new NACAM Rally Championship regional series when it was created in 2008. After that first year the NACAM championship shifted its Mexican round to the Rally Sierra del Tigre.

In 2009, the Rally was run as the International Rally of Nations. In 2010 amid a year-long fiesta to mark the 100th anniversary of the Mexican Revolution and the 200th anniversary of its independence, the WRC returned to León.

In 2017, the rally is again part of the NACAM Rally Championship and featured the longest stage in modern WRC history (80 Km).

== Winners ==
Pink background indicates that in that year the rally was not part of WRC calendar.

Year	Rally	Winner	Car
1979	1. Rally América		
1980	2. Rally América		
1981	3. Rally América		
1982	4. Rally América		
1983	5. Rally América		
1984	6. Rally América 2000	(Mexico) Jaime Balmes (Mexico) Romero	Chevrolet Citation
1985	7. Rally América 2000	(Mexico) Emilio de la Parra (Mexico) Marin	Ford Mustang
1991	8. Rally América		
1993	9. Rally América	(Mexico) Giuseppe Spataro (France) Jean Noel Valdelièvre	Mitsubishi Eclipse
1994	10. Rally América	(Mexico) Agustín Zamora (Mexico) Gabriel Marín	Mitsubishi Eclipse
1997	Rally América 2000	(United States) Roger Hull (United States) Sean Gallagher	Mitsubishi Eclipse
1998	Rally Enerplex America 2000	(Mexico) Carlos Izquierdo (rally driver) (Mexico) Angélica Fuentes	Nissan Tsuru
1999	13. Rally México	(Mexico) Gabriel Marín (Mexico) Javier Marín	Mitsubishi Lancer Evolution
2000	14. Rally México	(Jamaica) Douglas Gore (Jamaica) Mark Nelson	Mitsubishi Lancer Evolution
Under FIA observation
2001	15. Corona Rally América	(Peru) Ramón Ferreyros (Peru) Raúl Velit	Toyota Celica GT-Four ST205
2002	16. Corona Rally México	(Finland) Harri Rovanperä (Finland) Risto Pietiläinen	Peugeot 206 WRC; Peugeot Total
2003	17. Corona Rally México	(Argentina) Marcos Ligato (Argentina) Rubén García (rally driver)	Mitsubishi Lancer Evolution VII; Top Run
World Rally Championship round
2004	1. Corona Rally México	(Estonia) Markko Märtin (United Kingdom) Michael Park	Ford Focus RS WRC 03; Ford World Rally Team
2005	2. Corona Rally México	(Norway) Petter Solberg (United Kingdom) Phil Mills	Subaru Impreza WRC 2005; Subaru World Rally Team
2006	3. Corona Rally México	(France) Sébastien Loeb (Monaco) Daniel Elena	Citroën Xsara WRC; Kronos Total Citroën WRT
2007	4. Corona Rally México	(France) Sébastien Loeb (Monaco) Daniel Elena	Citroën C4 WRC; Citroën Total World Rally Team
2008	5. Corona Rally México	(France) Sébastien Loeb (Monaco) Daniel Elena	Citroën C4 WRC; Citroën Total World Rally Team
2009	Rally de las Naciones	(Austria) Manfred Stohl (Austria) Ilka Minor	Mitsubishi Lancer Evo; Manfred Stohl
2010	7. Rally Guanajuato Bicentenario	(France) Sébastien Loeb (Monaco) Daniel Elena	Citroën C4 WRC; Citroën Total World Rally Team
2011	8. Rally Guanajuato Mexico	(France) Sébastien Loeb (Monaco) Daniel Elena	Citroën DS3 WRC; Citroën Total World Rally Team
2012	9. Rally Guanajuato Mexico	(France) Sébastien Loeb (Monaco) Daniel Elena	Citroën DS3 WRC; Citroën Total World Rally Team
2013	10. Rally Guanajuato Mexico	(France) Sébastien Ogier (France) Julien Ingrassia	Volkswagen Polo R WRC; Volkswagen Motorsport
2014	11. Rally Guanajuato Mexico	(France) Sébastien Ogier (France) Julien Ingrassia	Volkswagen Polo R WRC; Volkswagen Motorsport
2015	12. Rally Guanajuato Mexico	(France) Sébastien Ogier (France) Julien Ingrassia	Volkswagen Polo R WRC; Volkswagen Motorsport
2016	13. Rally Guanajuato Mexico	(Finland) Jari-Matti Latvala (Finland) Miikka Anttila	Volkswagen Polo R WRC; Volkswagen Motorsport
2017	14. Rally Guanajuato Mexico	(United Kingdom) Kris Meeke (Republic of Ireland) Paul Nagle	Citroën C3 WRC; Citroën Total World Rally Team
2018	15. Rally Guanajuato Mexico	(France) Sébastien Ogier (France) Julien Ingrassia	Ford Fiesta WRC; M-Sport Ford WRT
2019	16. Rally Guanajuato Mexico	(France) Sébastien Ogier (France) Julien Ingrassia	Citroën C3 WRC; Citroën Total WRT
2020	17. Rally Guanajuato Mexico	(France) Sébastien Ogier (France) Julien Ingrassia	Toyota Yaris WRC; Toyota Gazoo Racing WRT
2021	FIA NACAM Rally Guanajuato 2021	(Mexico) Ricardo Cordero Jr (Mexico) Marco Hernández	Citroën C3 Rally2; GHR Rally Team
2022	Rally of Nations Guanajuato 2022	(Norway) Mads Østberg (Sweden) Johan Johansson	Citroën C3 Rally2; Team Norway
2023	19. Rally Guanajuato Mexico	(France) Sébastien Ogier (France) Vincent Landais	Toyota GR Yaris Rally1; Toyota Gazoo Racing WRT
2024	Rally of Nations Guanajuato 2024	(Norway) Mads Østberg (Sweden) Patrik Barth	Škoda Fabia R5; Team Scandinavia

=== Multiple winners ===
Wins	Driver	Years won
7	(France) Sébastien Ogier	2013–2015, 2018–2020, 2023
6	(France) Sébastien Loeb	2006–2008, 2010–2012

Wins	Manufacturers
10	Citroën
7	Mitsubishi
4	Volkswagen
3	Toyota
2	Ford
