= Chihuahua Express =

Open-road race in Chihuahua, Mexico

The Chihuahua Express is a three-day stage rally or open-road race in Chihuahua, Mexico. The first edition took place in 2007 as a continuation of the Border Challenge rally (2005–2006). The Express comprises three daily stages: Chihuahua–Ciudad Madera, Chihuahua–Divisadero (Copper Canyon) and Chihuahua–Ojinaga. There is also a qualifying stage on Thursday morning before the competition on Friday, Saturday, and Thursday. The starting order on Friday is determined by the order of finish in this stage.

The full competition cars cover 1000 miles over the three days, including about 250 miles of unlimited speed or "velocity" stages. The average speed stage is 7.4 miles long, including one that is 20.5 miles long. Over the three days there are 33-35 speed stages. The cars line up before each stage at a calculated time, and are started in one-minute intervals to race against the clock. Each day the cars travel to cities outside of Chihuahua City for a lunch and service break, and then race back on the same roads, returning to the same luxury hotel each evening. The speed stages are on closed, paved highways mostly in the mountains, including a stage on Day #2 that takes the cars to the rim of the famed Copper Canyon, the "Grand Canyon" of Mexico. Here they stop for lunch at a hotel on the canyon's rim. On the final day, the cars race 145 miles east to the city of Ojinaga, which is across the border from Presidio, Texas, where they stop for service and then return on the same highway to Chihuahua.

The Chihuahua Express is open to all modern and vintage cars, even pickups, that are divided into several classifications. La Carrera Panamericana cars will compete in their own Pan-Am class, as well as for the overall championship. All stage-rally cars must be "street legal" and have a full roll cage and other safety equipment. Drivers and navigators are required in all cars, and each must possess a Mexican rally license, which is issued before the event. Competitors are expected to have a racing license from their home county or sufficient training and racing experience.

Regular street cars, even local airport rentals, may participate in the Express Tour, a "regularity" or time-to-distance rally on the same days and roads used by the stage-rally cars. A co-driver and helmet are the only safety equipment required for the Tour. Each must also have a cell phone enabled for Mexico. The Tour is an excellent way to learn about rallying south of the border.

Medals are awarded daily and at the end of the event for the full competition cars and the Tour.

Assistance is provided to all competitors from the U.S. and Canada for importing their vehicles temporarily into Mexico. Convoys of tow trucks, trailers, and race cars leave from El Paso, Texas for the 230 mile trip to Chihuahua City on the Wednesday before this weekend event. Another group will cross the border at Presidio for the 145 miles trip to Chihuahua. Normally, they get together in Alpine, Texas, the night before.

The international drivers Stig Blomqvist and Michel Jourdain Jr. have participated in this rally. Carrera Panamericana winners Doug Mockett and Bill Beilharz as well as some NASCAR Corona Series drivers, such as Bobby Unser, have also participated.

The organizer of the event is Manuel "Chacho" Medina, whose office is in Mexico City. The representative for the U.S. and Canada is Gerie Bledsoe of Santa Rosa Beach, Florida.

The Chihuahua Express is affiliated with the Silver State Classic Challenge of Nevada.

== Champions ==
Year	Driver	Co-driver	Car
2007	(United States) Doug Mockett	(Mexico) Angélica Fuentes	Oldsmobile 88 (1954)
2008	(United States) Kevin Jones	(United States) Mark D. Williams	Subaru Impreza WRX
2009	(Mexico) Gabriel Pérez	(Mexico) Horacio Chousal	Studebaker
2010	(Mexico) Rodrigo González	(Mexico) Rodolfo González	Maserati Trofeo
2011	(Mexico) Michel Jourdain Jr.	(Mexico) Miguel Angel Diéz	Studebaker Champion (1955)
2012	(Mexico) Eduardo Henkel	(Mexico) Sergio Puente	BMW M3

== Fatalities ==
In the 2010 edition, in two separates accidents, there were three fatalities: Carlos "El Chino" García Almazán, a local driver and Hernán Solana, (Moisés Solana's brother) and Heberto García, his co-driver. The final stage was canceled.
