= 2010 Chihuahua Express =

The fourth edition of the Chihuahua Express was reduced to 2 days because two fatal accidents.

== Days ==
=== Day 1 Chihuahua-Cd. Madera-Chihuahua ===
The first day had 9 speed sections. The total distance was 162.79 km. 48 drivers took the start. This stage was marked by the death of Carlos "Chino" García.

Pos	Driver	Co-driver	Car	Time	Speed (km/h)
1	(Mexico) Rodrigo González	(Mexico) Rodolfo González	Maserati Trofeo	1:07:41.5	144.29
2	(Belgium) Marc Devis	(Belgium) Christofer A. Voegelin D.	Studebaker	+1:24.3	141.36
3	(Belgium) Stephan Mayers	(Mexico) Mauricio Pimentel	Studebaker	+1:56.3	140.28
4	(United States) Doug Mockett	(Mexico) Angelica Fuentes	Oldsmobile	+2:01.2	140.11
5	(Mexico) Eduardo Henkel	(Mexico) Sergio Puente	BMW	+3:22.2	137.45

=== Day 2 Chihuahua-Divisadero-Chihuahua ===
The second day had 12 speed sections. The total distance was 171.43 km. The second day was marked by the death of Hernán Solana, brother of Moises Solana.

Pos	Driver	Co-driver	Car	Time	Speed (km/h)
1	(Mexico) Rodrigo González	(Mexico) Rodolfo González	Maserati Trofeo	1:13:23.5	140.15
2	(United States) Doug Mockett	(Mexico) Angelica Fuentes	Oldsmobile	+1:18.0	137.71
3	(Belgium) Stephan Mayers	(Mexico) Mauricio Pimentel	Studebaker	+2:45.3	135.08
4	(Mexico) Eduardo Henkel	(Mexico) Sergio Puente	BMW	+5:06.1	131.04
5	(Belgium) Thierry de Latre	(Belgium) Eric Werner	Studebaker	+7:45.3	126.76
