= 2009 Chihuahua Express =

The third edition of the Chihuahua Express started on March 27 and finished on March 29. Gabriel Pérez and Horacio Chousal won this event in their Studebaker.

== Results ==
Pos	Driver	Co-driver	Car	Category	Time
1	(Mexico) Gabriel Pérez	(Mexico) Horacio Chousal	Studebaker	Pan Am	4:47:40
2	(United States) Doug Mockett	(Mexico) Angélica Fuentes	Oldsmobile	Pan Am	4:50:02
3	(Mexico) Ricardo Vega	(Mexico) Rodrigo González	Maserati	+2.4L	5:00:24
4	(Belgium) Marc Devis	(Belgium) José Luis Caparros	Studebaker	Pan Am	5:01:34
5	(Mexico) Francisco Márquez	(Mexico) Araceli Ramírez	Hudson	Pan Am	5:11:42
6	(Mexico) Francisco Peréa	(Mexico) Víctor Pérez	Caribe	-2.4L	5:22:14
7	(United States) Steve Waldman	(Mexico) Felipe Argüelles	Mitsubishi	-2.4L Turbo	5:29:54
8	(Mexico) Eduardo López Márquez	(Mexico) Luis Angel de la Brena	Golf	-2.4	5:31:56
9	(United States) Chip Fudge	(United States) J. Taylor Fudge	Chevy	Historic C	5:36:26
10	(Mexico) Eduardo Henkel	(Mexico) Sergio Puente	Porsche	Pan Am	5:38:38
11	(Mexico) José Antonio Calderón	(Mexico) Mario Domenzain	Renault	-2.4 L	5:39:22
12	(Mexico) José Solana	(Mexico) Jorge Bernal	Mitsubishi	-2.4L Turbo	5:40:32
13	(United States) Frank Mckinnon	(United States) John Putnam	Ford	+2.4L	5:42:10
14	(Mexico) Ricardo Triviño	(Mexico) Marco Hernández	Mitsubishi	2.4L Turbo	5:45:52
15	(United States) Gerie Bledsoe	(United States) Fernando Garcia	Chevy	Historic C	5:50:46
16	(United States) Ralph Carungi	(United States) Bill Richtert	Lincoln	Pan Am	5:52:52
17	(Germany) Wilhelm Ostrop	(Germany) Alex Ostrop	Chevy	Historic C	5:52:58
18	(Mexico) Carlos Azcarate	(Mexico) Manuel Lombera	Golf	-2.4 L	6:02:46
19	(United States) Frank Bushman	(United States) Matthew Row	BMW	-2.4 L	6:14:18
20	(United States) Todd Landon	(United States) Vance F. Stewart	Ford	Bracket	6:17:12
21	(United States) Gunter Sundag	(United States) Barbara Hernandez	Mercedes	Pan Am	6:38:00
22	(Sweden) Stig Blomqvist	(Venezuela) Ana Goñi	Studebaker	Pan Am	6:44:48
23	(United States) Michael Sharp/ (United States) Jon LeCarner		Ford	Historic C	6:58:06
24	(United States) Brad Kaplan	(United States) Derek Dwyer	Lincoln	Pan Am	8:58:14
25	(Sweden) Lars Stugemo	(Sweden) Jonny Olofsson	Studebaker	Pan Am	10:04:16
26	(United States) Chris Sayler		Chevy	Pan Am	10:18.04
27	(United States) Jake Shuttlesworth	(United States) Tony Bogovich	Ford	Historic C	10:18:30
28	(United States) Carson Scheller	(United States) Lauren Scheller	Ford	Pan Am	10:34:10
29	(United States) Bob Mitchell	(United States) John Lyons	Dodge	+2.4 L	10:57:34
30	(United States) John Magnuson	(United States) David Magnuson	Mazda	-2.4L Turbo	11:54:00
31	(United States) Mike Feezor	(United States) Gary Hart	Ford	+2.4 L Turbo	11:54:00
32	(United States) Helge Nyland	(United States) Chris Cochrane	Studebaker	Historic C	11:54:00
33	(Canada) John Gregory	(Canada) Chrislana Gregory	Studebaker	Pan Am	11:54:00

=== By stage ===
Date	Stage	Driver	Co-driver	Car
March 27	Chihuahua-Cd. Madera-Chihuahua	(Mexico) Gabriel Pérez	(Mexico) Horacio Chousal	Studebaker
March 28	Chihuahua-Divisadero-Chihuahua	(Mexico) Ricardo Triviño	(Mexico) Marco Hernández	Mitsubishi
March 29	Chihuahua-Ojinaga-Chihuahua	(United States) Doug Mockett	(Mexico) Angélica Fuentes	Oldsmobile
