= 2020 World Rally Championship =

48th running of the World Rally Championship

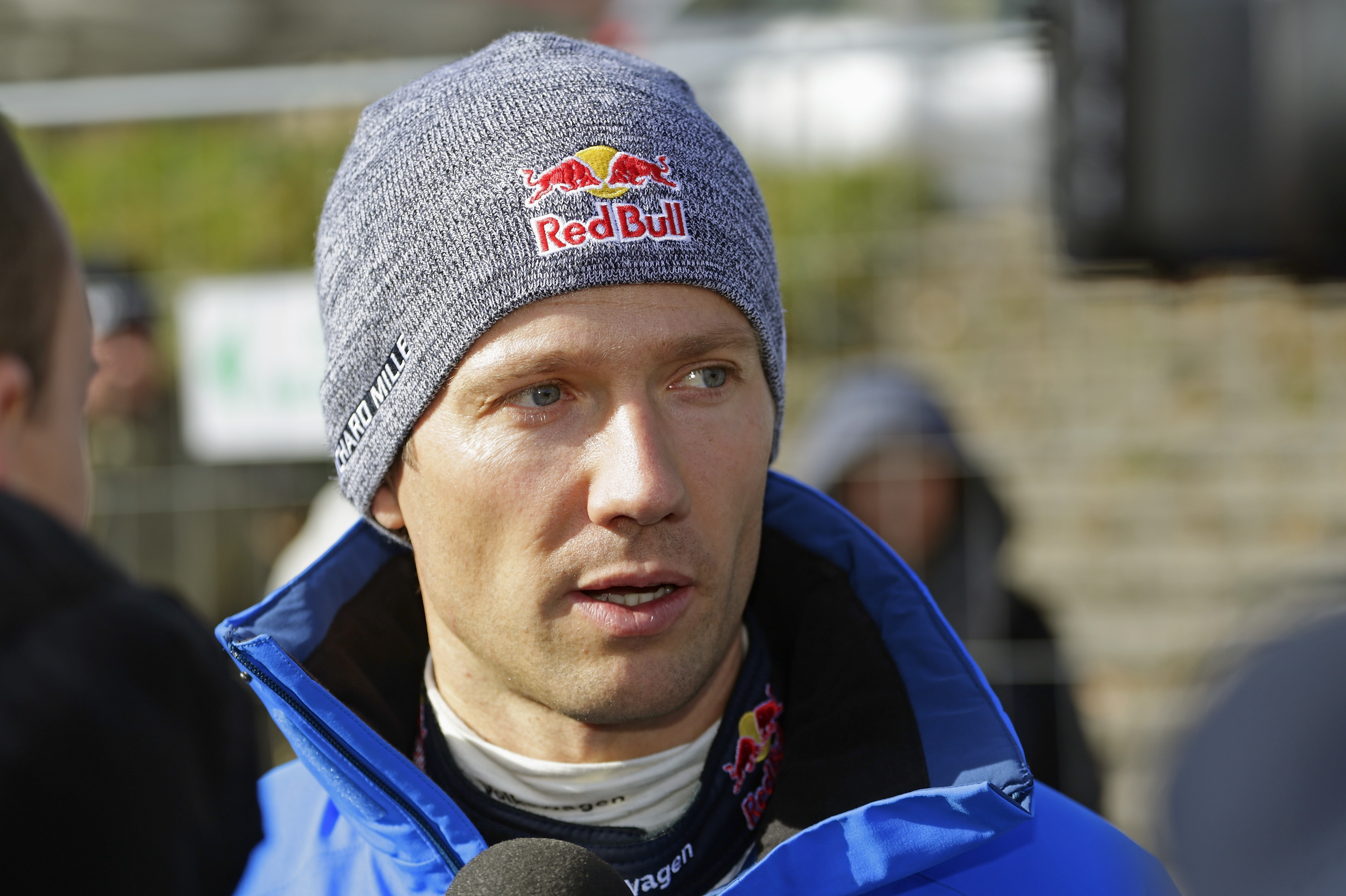
Sébastien Ogier won his seventh drivers' championship title.

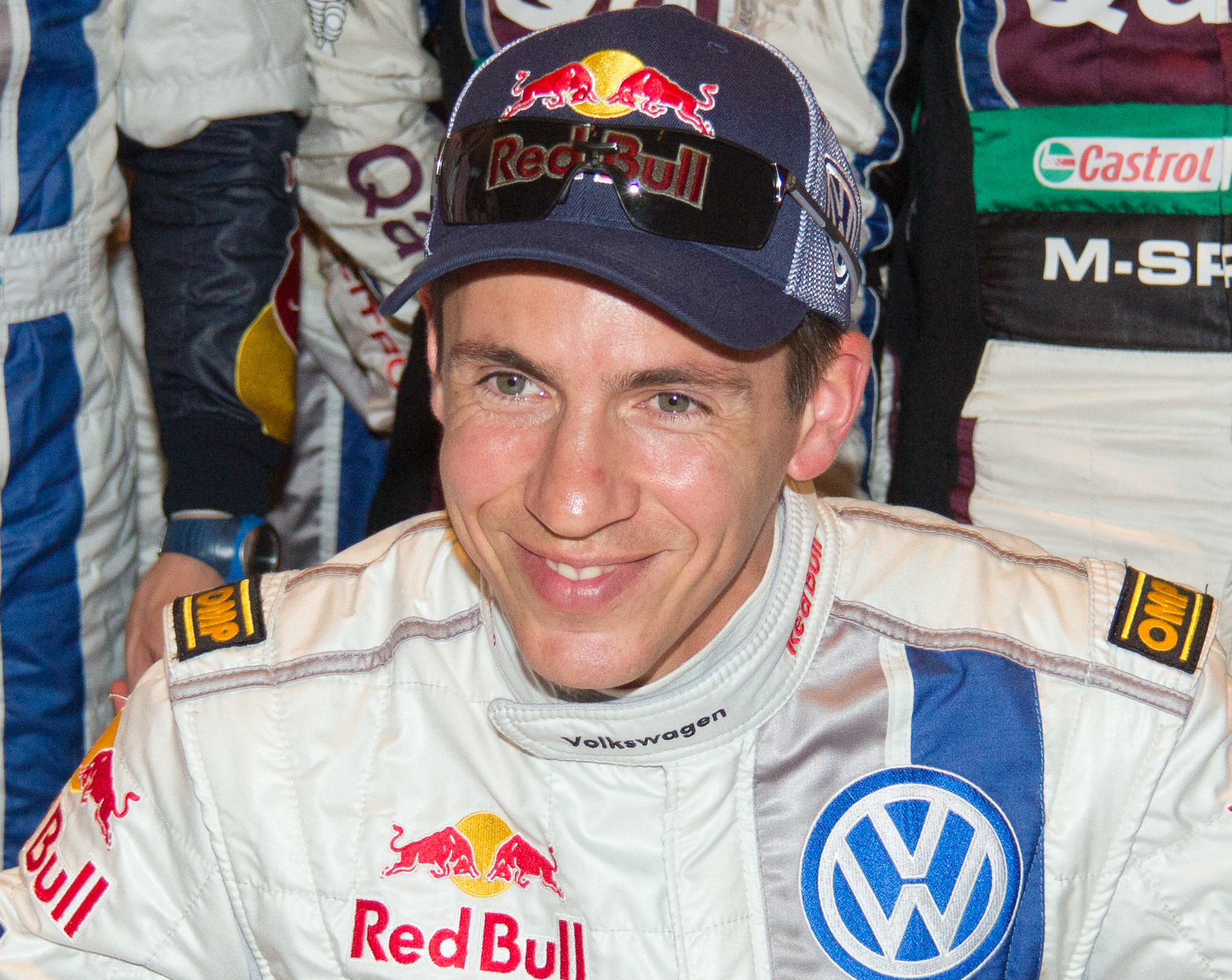
Julien Ingrassia won his seventh co-drivers' championship title.

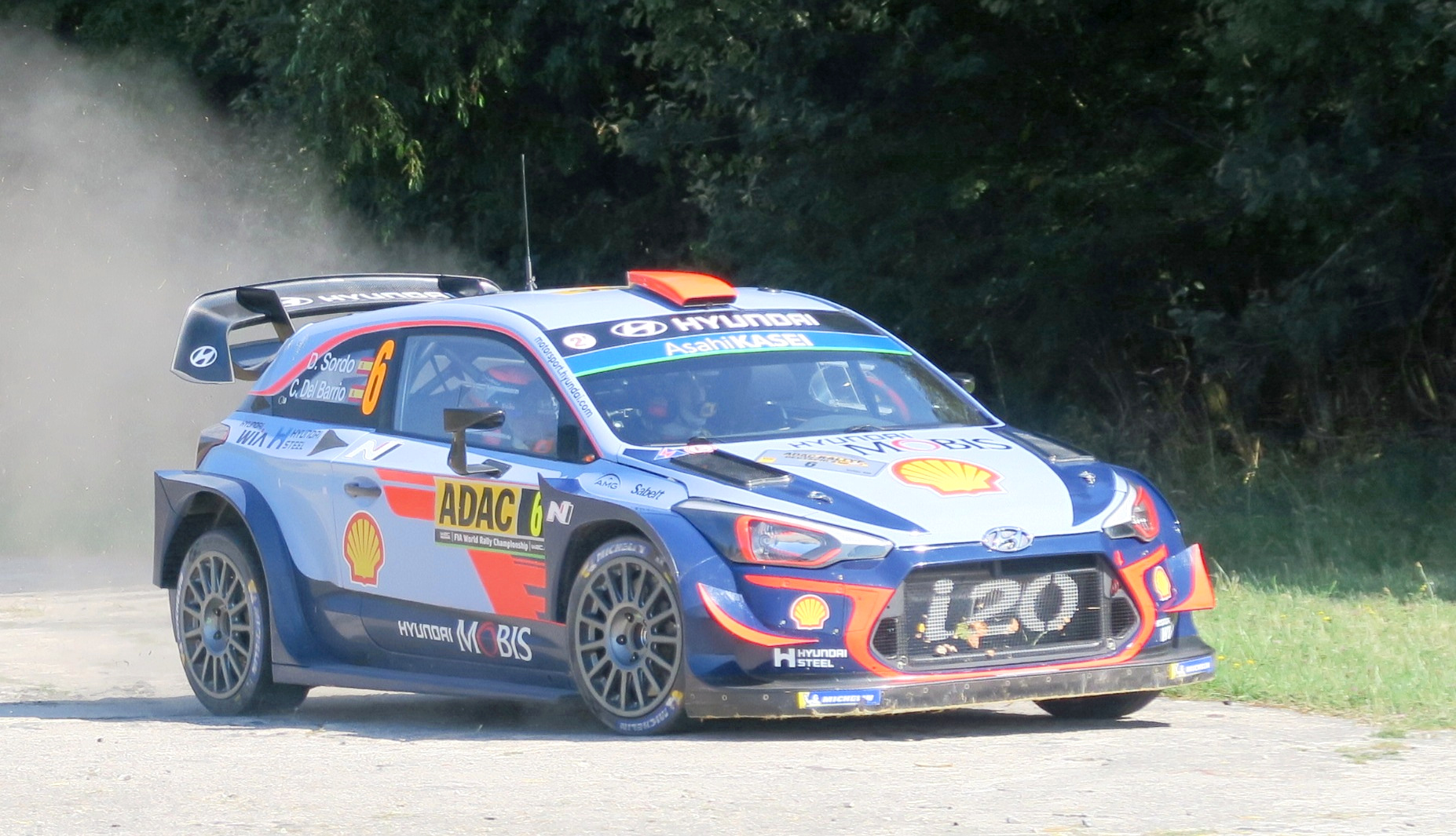
Hyundai Shell Mobis WRT (i20 Coupe WRC pictured) claimed the manufacturers' title for the second straight year.

The 2020 FIA World Rally Championship was the forty-eighth season of the World Rally Championship, a rallying competition organised by the Fédération Internationale de l'Automobile (FIA). Teams and crews competed in seven rallies for the World Rally Championships for Drivers, Co-drivers and Manufacturers. Crews were free to compete in cars complying with various regulations, however, only manufacturers competing with World Rally Cars homologated under regulations introduced in 2017 were eligible to score points in the Manufacturers' championship. The championship began in January 2020 with the Rallye Monte-Carlo and concluded in December 2020 with Rally Monza. The series was supported by the WRC2, WRC3 and Junior WRC categories at selected events.

The championship was heavily affected by the COVID-19 pandemic. Thirteen events were planned prior to the pandemic, but with several events being cancelled due to the pandemic, and some new ones added as replacements, eventually seven events were held. This was the fewest completed rallies of any season in the history of the series.

Ott Tänak and Martin Järveoja were the defending Drivers' and Co-drivers' Champions, having secured their maiden titles at the 2019 Rally Catalunya. Hyundai Shell Mobis WRT, the team Tänak and Järveoja compete for, were the defending Manufacturers' Champions. (Note: Tänak and Järveoja won their titles with Toyota Gazoo Racing WRT but left the team to join Hyundai for the 2020 championship.) Hyundai won their maiden manufacturers' title when the final round of the 2019 championship was cancelled.

At the conclusion of the championship, Sébastien Ogier and Julien Ingrassia won their seventh world titles after winning the 2020 Rally Monza. In doing so, Ogier and Ingrassia became the first crew to win the championship with three different manufacturers. (Note: Juha Kankkunen won four drivers' championships with three manufacturers, but he did not have the same co-driver each time.) Elfyn Evans and Scott Martin finished second, trailing Ogier and Ingrassia by eight points. Defending World Champions Tänak and Järveoja were third, a further nine points behind. In the manufacturers' championship, Hyundai Shell Mobis WRT successfully defended their title, five points cleared of Toyota Gazoo Racing WRT, with M-Sport Ford WRT in third.

== Calendar ==
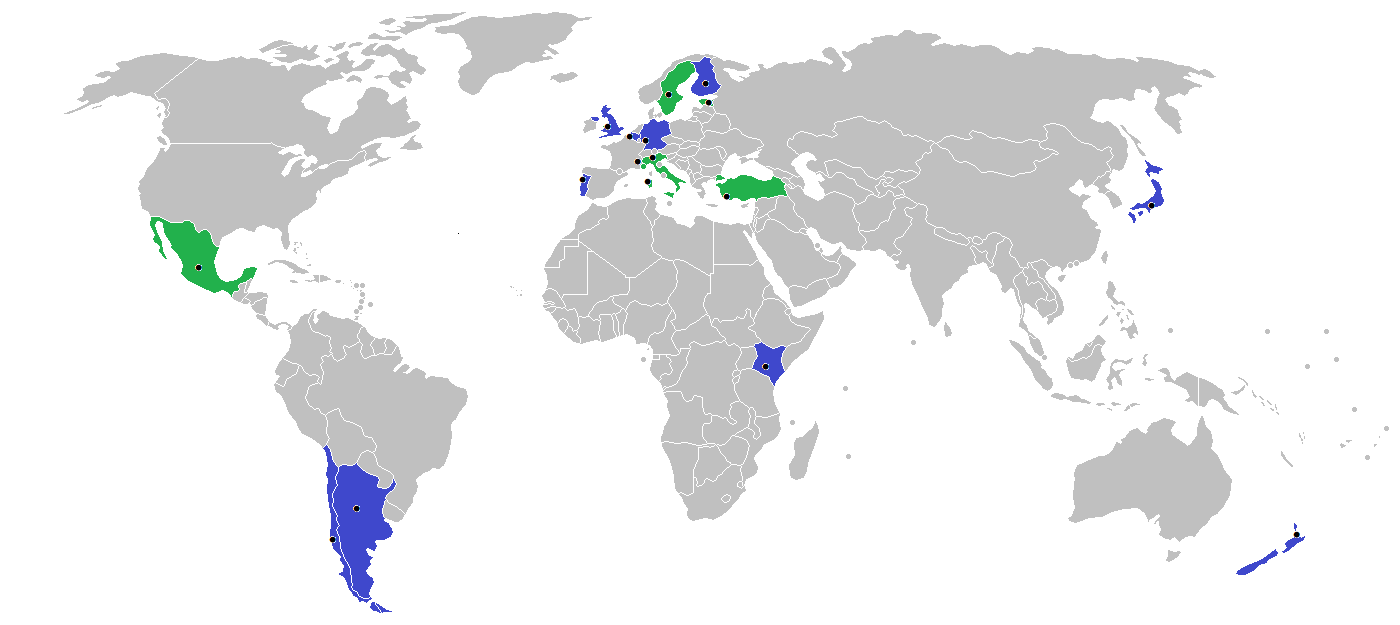
A map showing the locations of the rallies in the 2020 championship. Contested events are in green, while cancelled events are in blue. Event headquarters are marked with a black dot.

The 2020 championship was due to be contested over thirteen rounds in Europe, Africa, Asia, the Middle East, North and South America, and Oceania, but the calendar was reduced to seven rounds due to the COVID-19 pandemic.

Round	Start date	Finish date	Rally	Rally headquarters	Surface	Stages	Distance	Ref.
1	23 January	26 January	(Monaco) Rallye Automobile Monte Carlo	Gap, Provence-Alpes-Côte d'Azur (Note: The rally base of the Monte Carlo Rally was located in France.)	Mixed (Note: The Monte Carlo Rally is run on a tarmac and snow surface.)	16	304.28 km	
2	13 February	16 February	Rally Sweden	Torsby, Värmland	Snow	11	171.64 km (Note: The route of Rally Sweden was shortened from 301.26 km over 19 stages to 9 stages totalling 148.55 km. The route was shortened due to a lack of snow and bad weather conditions.)	
3	12 March	15 March	(Mexico) Rally Guanajuato México	León, Guanajuato	Gravel	21	268.84 km (Note: The route of Rally Mexico was shortened by 56.01 km.)	
4	4 September	6 September	Rally Estonia	Tartu, Tartu County	Gravel	17	232.64 km	
5	18 September	20 September	Rally of Turkey	Marmaris, Muğla	Gravel	12	223.00 km	
6	8 October	11 October	(Italy) Rally Italia Sardegna	Alghero, Sardinia	Gravel	16	238.84 km	
7	3 December	6 December	(Italy) ACI Rally Monza	Monza, Lombardy	Tarmac	16	239.20 km	

The following rounds were included on the original calendar published by WRC Promoter GmbH, but were later cancelled:

Start date	Finish date	Rally	Rally headquarters	Surface	Stages	Distance	Cancellation reason	Ref.
16 April	19 April	Rally Chile	Concepción, Biobío	Gravel	—N/a	—N/a	Political unrest	
23 April (Note: The running dates of Rally Argentina were initially scheduled to be 30 April to 3 May.)	26 April	Rally Argentina	Villa Carlos Paz, Córdoba	Gravel	16	322.36 km	COVID-19 pandemic	
21 May	24 May	Rally de Portugal	Matosinhos, Porto	Gravel	22	331.10 km	COVID-19 pandemic	
16 July	19 July	Safari Rally Kenya	Nairobi	Gravel	18	315.12 km	COVID-19 pandemic	
6 August	9 August	Rally Finland	Jyväskylä, Central Finland	Gravel	24	321.87 km	COVID-19 pandemic	
3 September	6 September	Rally New Zealand	Auckland, Te Ika-a-Māui	Gravel	—N/a	—N/a	COVID-19 pandemic	
15 October	18 October	(Germany) ADAC Rallye Deutschland	Bostalsee, Saarland	Tarmac	—N/a	—N/a	COVID-19 pandemic	
29 October	1 November	(United Kingdom) Wales Rally GB	Llandudno, Conwy	Gravel	—N/a	—N/a	COVID-19 pandemic	
19 November	22 November	Rally Japan	Nagoya, Chūbu	Tarmac	19	307.78 km	COVID-19 pandemic	
20 November	22 November	Renties Ypres Rally Belgium	Ypres, West Flanders	Tarmac	23	265.69 km	COVID-19 pandemic	

=== Calendar changes ===
With the addition of Rally Chile to the calendar in 2019, the FIA opened the tender process for new events to join the championship in 2020. Bids to revive Rally Japan and the Safari Rally were received, and candidate events were run in 2019. Both events were accepted to the 2020 calendar, as was a proposal to revive Rally New Zealand. However, none of the aforementioned events were run due to the COVID-19 pandemic.

- The Safari Rally was scheduled to be run as a World Championship event for the first time since 2002. The event was to be based in the Kenyan capital Nairobi and feature stages around Lake Naivasha. In contrast to the event's traditional endurance format, which featured stages hundreds of kilometres long, the 2020 Safari Rally was planned to follow a compact route to comply with FIA regulations mandating the maximum route distance.
- Rally Japan was scheduled to return to the calendar for the first time since 2010, replacing Rally Australia as the final round of the championship. The rally was scheduled to move away from its original headquarters in Hokkaidō to a new base in Nagoya and was to be run on tarmac rather than gravel.
- Rally New Zealand was scheduled to return to the calendar for the first time since 2012. The event was planned to return to Auckland.

The addition of these events saw the Tour de Corse and the Rallies of Catalunya and Australia removed from the calendar. Organisers of Rally Catalunya agreed to forfeit their place on the 2020 calendar as part of a rotation system that will see European events host rallies in two out of three calendar years. The Tour de Corse was removed in response to concerns from teams about the logistics of visiting Corsica, while Rally Australia was removed as the event's base in a regional centre rather than a major metropolitan area meant that the rally struggled to attract spectators. Rally Chile was included on the original calendar, but was later removed in the face of ongoing political unrest in the country. The FIA sought a replacement event to ensure that the calendar retained its planned fourteen rounds, but were unable to do so.

The Rallies in Italy were postponed as a result of the COVID-19 pandemic. Events in Argentina, Portugal, Kenya, Finland, New Zealand, Germany, Great Britain and Japan were cancelled. Organisers of the championship announced that they were considering adding events to the schedule that had not been part of the original calendar. Estonia, Belgium, Latvia, Croatia and Czech Republic were among the countries who had expressed interest hosting the event.

The running date of Rally Turkey was moved forward by a week, which facilitated the opportunity for additional rounds. Further calendar options included Ypres Rally and Croatia Rally. Following the cancellation of Rallye Deutschland, the running date of Rally Sardegna moved forward by three weeks. This decision was intended to avoid the clash with the 2020 Emilia Romagna Grand Prix of Formula One.

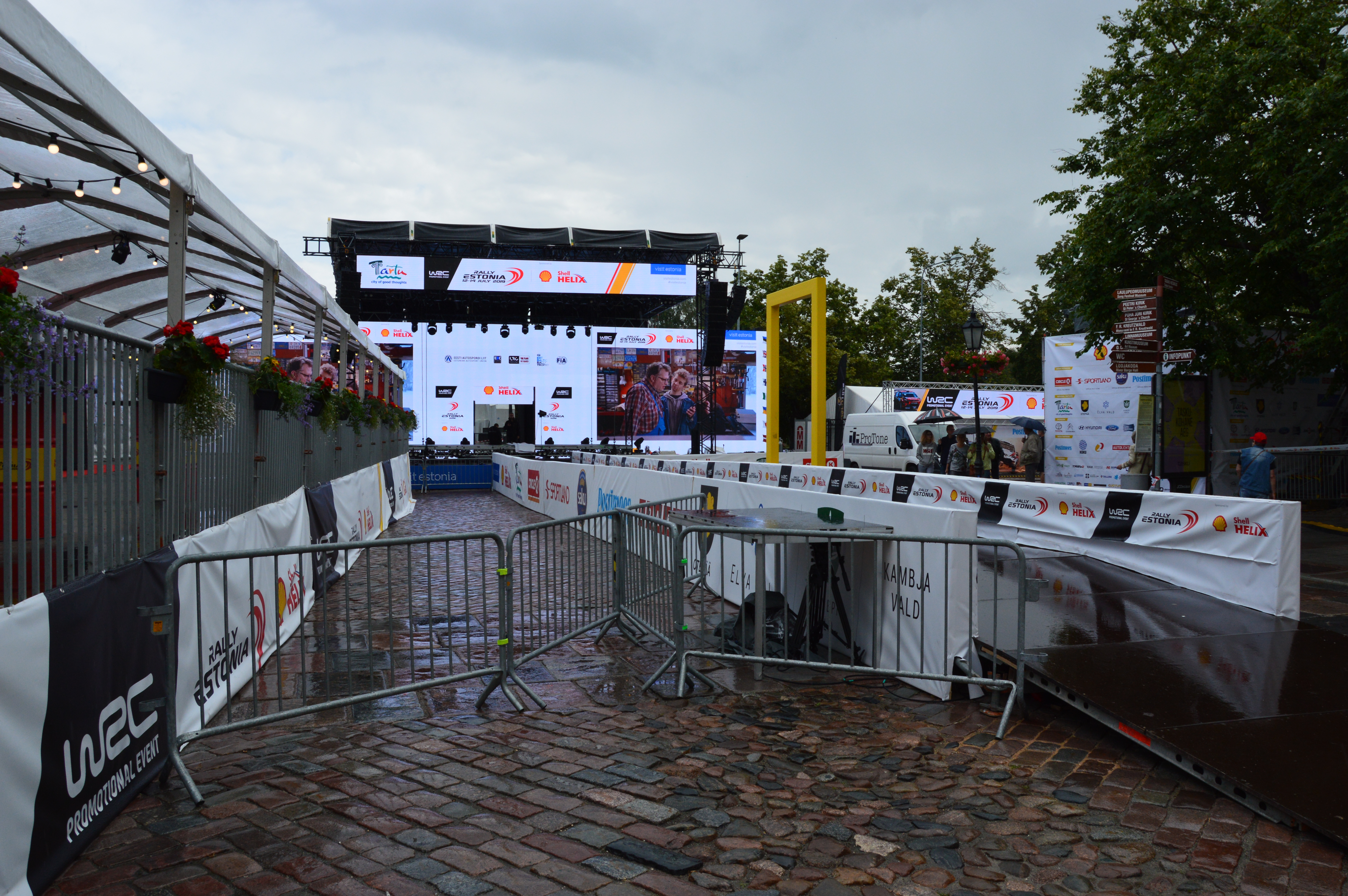
Estonia (Rally headquarter Tartu pictured) was the thirty-third country to host a World Rally Championship rally.

On 2 July 2020, it was announced that the season would return with an updated calendar. The season restarted with newcomers Rally Estonia hosting the resuming round between 4 and 6 September. The country became the thirty-third nation to stage a championship round in the WRC.

Following the cancellation of Rally Japan, it was announced that Ypres Rally, officially Renties Ypres Rally Belgium, would replace Rally Japan to hold the seventh round of the season. The Sunday's route would feature the iconic Circuit de Spa-Francorchamps in Stavelot, which would run with the 2020 World RX of Benelux of the World Rallycross Championship. Belgium was set to be the thirty-fourth country to hold a WRC event, but were unable to do so as the rally was eventually called off due to the COVID-19 pandemic.

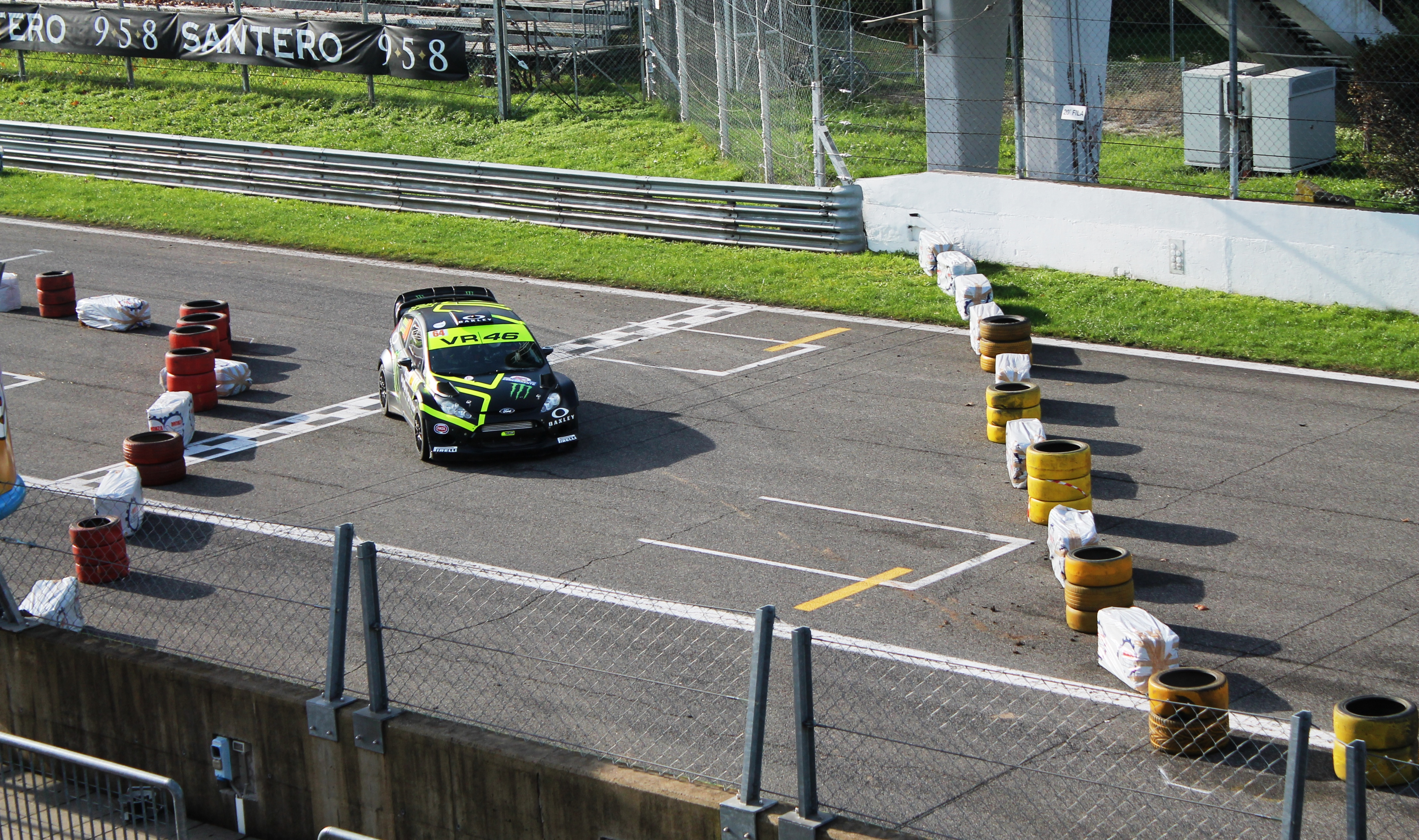
Calendar newcomer Rally Monza was the season's finale.

Rally Monza was announced to be the final round of the season on 9 October. This meant Italy staged two WRC events in one season as the country also stages the Sardinia rally. The rally was based in the famous Autodromo Nazionale di Monza circuit near Milan, where the Italian Grand Prix is held every year.

=== Route changes ===
Prior to the Rally Sweden, it was confirmed that the route for the rally had to be shortened due to a lack of snow. The route of Rally Mexico was shortened to allow teams time to pack up and return to their headquarters before several European nations imposed travel bans in a bid to manage the pandemic.

== Entries ==
The following teams and crews were under contract to contest the 2020 championship. (Note: Every crew that entered a World Rally Championship event—including WRC2, WRC3, Junior WRC and privateer entries—was eligible to score points in the World Championship for Drivers and the World Championship for Co-Drivers.) Ford, Hyundai and Toyota were all represented by manufacturer teams and eligible to score points in the FIA World Rally Championship for Manufacturers. All competitors used tyres supplied by Michelin.

World Rally Car entries eligible to score manufacturer points
Manufacturer	Entrant	Car	Tyre	No.	Driver name	Co-driver name	Rounds
Ford	(United Kingdom) M-Sport Ford WRT	Ford Fiesta WRC	M	3	(Finland) Teemu Suninen	(Finland) Jarmo Lehtinen	All
Ford	(United Kingdom) M-Sport Ford WRT	Ford Fiesta WRC	M	4	(Finland) Esapekka Lappi	(Finland) Janne Ferm	All
Ford	(United Kingdom) M-Sport Ford WRT	Ford Fiesta WRC	M	44	(United Kingdom) Gus Greensmith	(United Kingdom) Elliott Edmondson	1, 3–7
Hyundai	(South Korea) Hyundai Shell Mobis WRT	Hyundai i20 Coupe WRC	M	6	(Spain) Dani Sordo	(Spain) Carlos del Barrio	3, 6–7
Hyundai	(South Korea) Hyundai Shell Mobis WRT	Hyundai i20 Coupe WRC	M	8	(Estonia) Ott Tänak	(Estonia) Martin Järveoja	All
Hyundai	(South Korea) Hyundai Shell Mobis WRT	Hyundai i20 Coupe WRC	M	9	(France) Sébastien Loeb	(Monaco) Daniel Elena	1, 5
Hyundai	(South Korea) Hyundai Shell Mobis WRT	Hyundai i20 Coupe WRC	M	11	(Belgium) Thierry Neuville	(Belgium) Nicolas Gilsoul	All
Hyundai	(South Korea) Hyundai Shell Mobis WRT	Hyundai i20 Coupe WRC	M	16	(Republic of Ireland) Craig Breen	(Republic of Ireland) Paul Nagle	2
Hyundai	(South Korea) Hyundai Shell Mobis WRT	Hyundai i20 Coupe WRC	M	42	(Republic of Ireland) Craig Breen	(Republic of Ireland) Paul Nagle	4
Hyundai	(France) Hyundai 2C Competition	Hyundai i20 Coupe WRC	M	7	(France) Pierre-Louis Loubet	(France) Vincent Landais	4–6
Hyundai	(France) Hyundai 2C Competition	Hyundai i20 Coupe WRC	M	96	(Norway) Ole Christian Veiby	(Sweden) Jonas Andersson	7
Toyota	(Japan) Toyota Gazoo Racing WRT	Toyota Yaris WRC	M	17	(France) Sébastien Ogier	(France) Julien Ingrassia	All
Toyota	(Japan) Toyota Gazoo Racing WRT	Toyota Yaris WRC	M	33	(United Kingdom) Elfyn Evans	(United Kingdom) Scott Martin	All
Toyota	(Japan) Toyota Gazoo Racing WRT	Toyota Yaris WRC	M	69	(Finland) Kalle Rovanperä	(Finland) Jonne Halttunen	All

World Rally Car entries ineligible to score manufacturer points
Manufacturer	Entrant	Car	Tyre	No.	Driver name	Co-driver name	Rounds
Citroën	(France) Saintéloc Junior Team	Citroën C3 WRC	P	21	(Norway) Petter Solberg	(Norway) Andreas Mikkelsen	6
Ford	(Finland) JanPro	Ford Fiesta WRC	M	65	(Finland) Kimmo Kurkela	(Finland) Reeta Hämäläinen	4
Ford	(United Kingdom) M-Sport Ford WRT	Ford Fiesta WRC	M	(Note: The crew of Devidas Jocius and Mindaugas Varža competed with multiple numbers throughout the championship.)	(Lithuania) Deividas Jocius	(Lithuania) Mindaugas Varža	1–3
Ford	(Czech Republic) MP-Sports	Ford Fiesta RS WRC	M	22	(Czech Republic) Martin Prokop	(Czech Republic) Zdeněk Jůrka	6
Ford	(Estonia) OT Racing	Ford Fiesta WRC	M	64	(Estonia) Georg Gross	(Estonia) Raigo Mõlder	4
Toyota	(Finland) Latvala Motorsport	Toyota Yaris WRC	M	10	(Finland) Jari-Matti Latvala	(Finland) Juho Hänninen	2
Toyota	(Japan) Toyota Gazoo Racing WRT	Toyota Yaris WRC	M	18	(Japan) Takamoto Katsuta	(United Kingdom) Daniel Barritt	1–2, 4, 6–7

=== Summary ===
Reigning World Champions Ott Tänak and Martin Järveoja left Toyota and moved to Hyundai. The Estonian pair chose not to compete with the number 1, which may only be used by the defending champions. Thierry Neuville and Nicolas Gilsoul remained with Hyundai, marking their seventh season with the team. Sébastien Loeb and Daniel Elena also renewed their contracts with the team. Loeb and Elena contested the championship on a part-time basis, sharing their car with the crew of Dani Sordo and Carlos del Barrio. Crews led by Andreas Mikkelsen and Craig Breen were left without drives. Hyundai announced that they could form a second team for Breen and Mikkelsen to contest selected rallies, and entered Breen at the rally of Sweden, Estonia and Belgium. Mikkelsen returned to action at the Rally Sardegna, co-driving with 2003 World Drivers' Champion Petter Solberg. They contested the rally in Shakedown and Power Stage with Pirelli tyres to be used for the 2021 season.

The Citroën World Rally Team had committed to entering two full-time entries instead of three, continuing the policy they introduced in 2019. Sébastien Ogier and Esapekka Lappi were under contract to lead the team's crews until the team announced that they would withdraw from the championship with immediate effect. Citroën cited Ogier's decision to leave the team as the reason for withdrawing, (Note: Citroën had previously announced that they would withdraw at the end of the 2021 championship, co-inciding with the planned introduction of hybrid powertrains. The planned withdrawal was attributed to Citroën's existing partnership with Formula E team Techeetah.) but pledged support for independent teams competing with the R5 variant of the Citroën C3 WRC in the championship's support categories. The company also expressed a willingness to sell or rent their C3 WRCs to teams looking to compete in the sport's premier category.

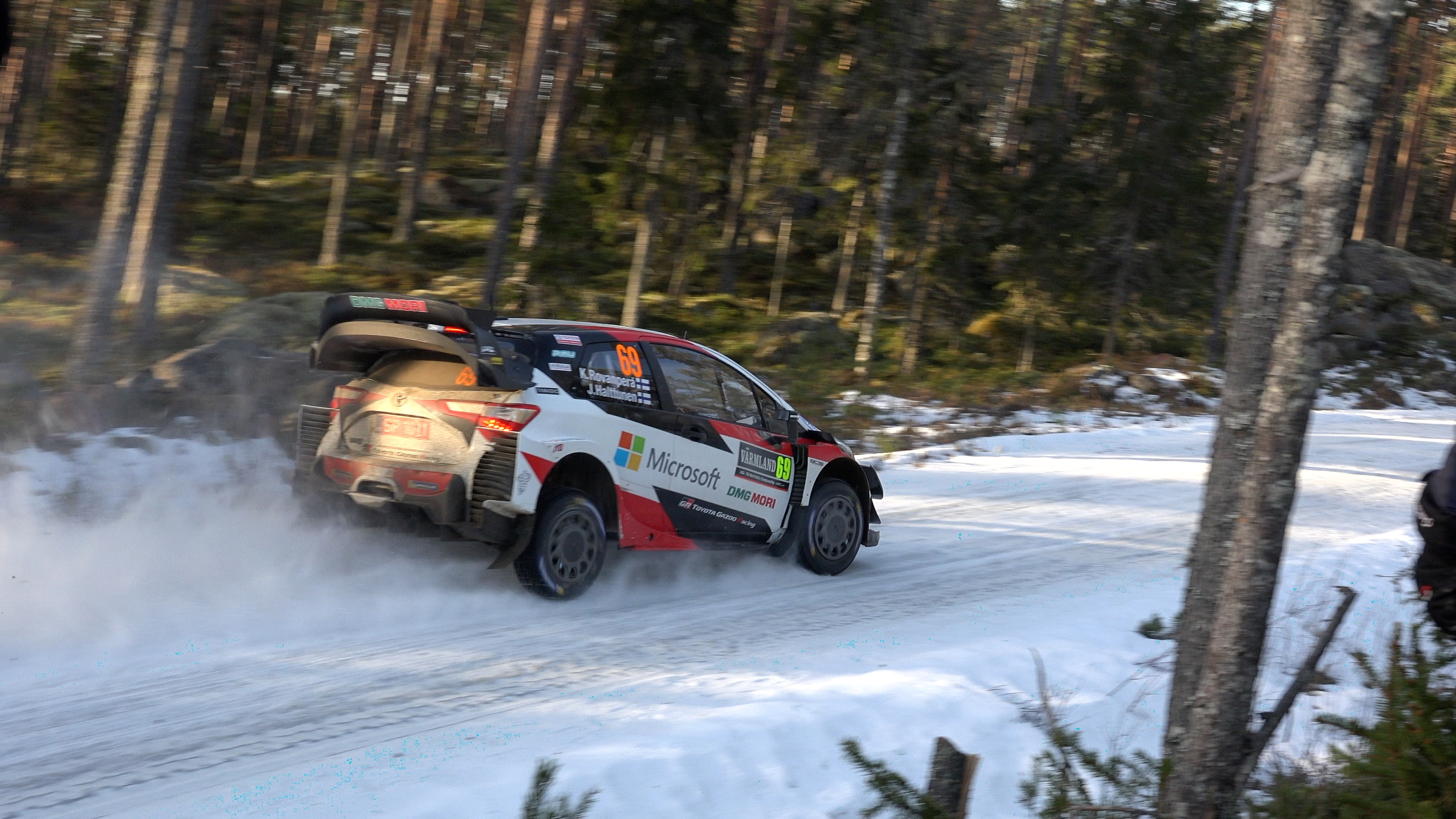
Nineteen-year-old Finn Kalle Rovanperä made his début in the sport's top class with his fellow co-driver Jonne Halttunen.

Toyota Gazoo Racing WRT featured an entirely new line-up in 2020. Sébastien Ogier and Julien Ingrassia replaced Ott Tänak and Martin Järveoja, while Elfyn Evans and Scott Martin were recruited from M-Sport Ford WRT. Reigning WRC2 Pro champions Kalle Rovanperä and Jonne Halttunen made their competitive début in Toyota's third car. Toyota entered an additional two cars for Jari-Matti Latvala and Takamoto Katsuta on a part-time basis. Katsuta contested all of the European rallies under the Toyota Gazoo Racing name while Latvala planned to contest two events—with further starts depending on his budget—as an independent entrant. Former Toyota Gazoo Racing driver Juho Hänninen became Latvala's co-driver, replacing Miikka Anttila. Anttila moved to WRC3, partnering Eerik Pietarinen. Kris Meeke remained under contract with the team, but stepped back from full-time competition.

M-Sport Ford WRT continued their policy of entering two crews on a full-time basis and a third crew contesting selected rounds. Teemu Suninen and Jarmo Lehtinen were retained, while Esapekka Lappi and Janne Ferm replaced Evans and Martin in the team's second car. Gus Greensmith and Elliott Edmondson, who contested three rounds of the 2019 championship with the team, contested an expanded programme in 2020.

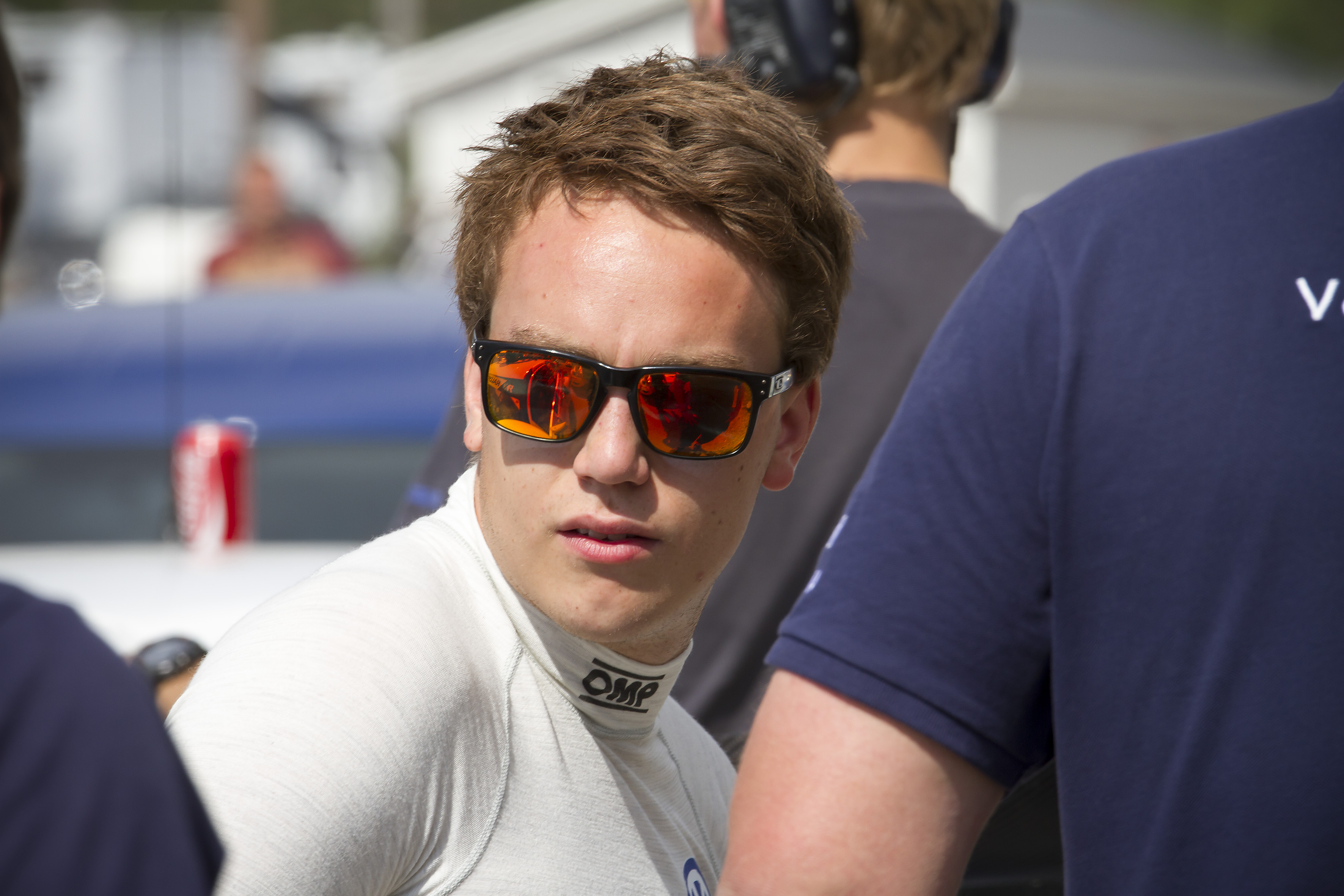
Norwegian driver Ole Christian Veiby made his World Rally Car debut in Monza.

Reigning WRC2 champions Pierre-Louis Loubet and Vincent Landais made their debut in a World Rally Car in Estonia. Loubet was set to combine his World Rally Championship programme with a factory-supported drive in WRC2, but was unable to do so. Ole Christian Veiby made his World Rally Car debut in Monza, taking over Loubet's i20.

== Regulation changes ==
=== Sporting regulations ===
Other than the normal approach to the WRC Manufacturer Championship, the FIA introduced a new regulation of "WRC Team" this year. A WRC team is eligible to score points only when there is a team scoring points in the WRC Manufacturer Championship with the same car homologation.

The FIA implemented a temporary testing ban in response to the COVID-19 pandemic. The ban was imposed because the three manufacturer teams were based in different countries—Hyundai in Germany, M-Sport in Britain and Toyota in Finland—each with their own restrictions. This created the potential for one team to gain a competitive advantage because of their home nation's restrictions.

The road order was revised in response to the shortened route at the calendar newcomers, Rally Estonia. Saturday's morning loop was started as championship order, while the afternoon loop was reverted to the standard reversed order, which usually comes into effect on the second leg.

== Season report ==
=== Opening rounds ===
The 2020 FIA World Rally Championship started in Monaco. The sport saw a series of crew changes in the off-season, which included reigning world champions Ott Tänak and Martin Järveoja moving to Hyundai. Tänak and Järveoja's title defence started poorly when they suffered a high-speed crash on the fourth stage of the rally, which saw their Hyundai i20 flying off a 40 m (131.2 ft) high cliff at 180 km/h (111.8 mph), rolling end-over-end through a series of trees and landing on the road below; both Tänak and Järveoja walked away uninjured. Following the crash, Hyundai's hopes rode on the shoulders of Thierry Neuville and Nicolas Gilsoul. Despite holding the lead on Thursday night, Friday saw the Toyota crews of Sébastien Ogier and Julien Ingrassia and their teammates Elfyn Evans and Scott Martin take the lead. The lead would swing backwards and forwards throughout the rally until Neuville and Gilsoul won seven out of the eight final stages—including winning the Power Stage—to record their first win in Monte Carlo.

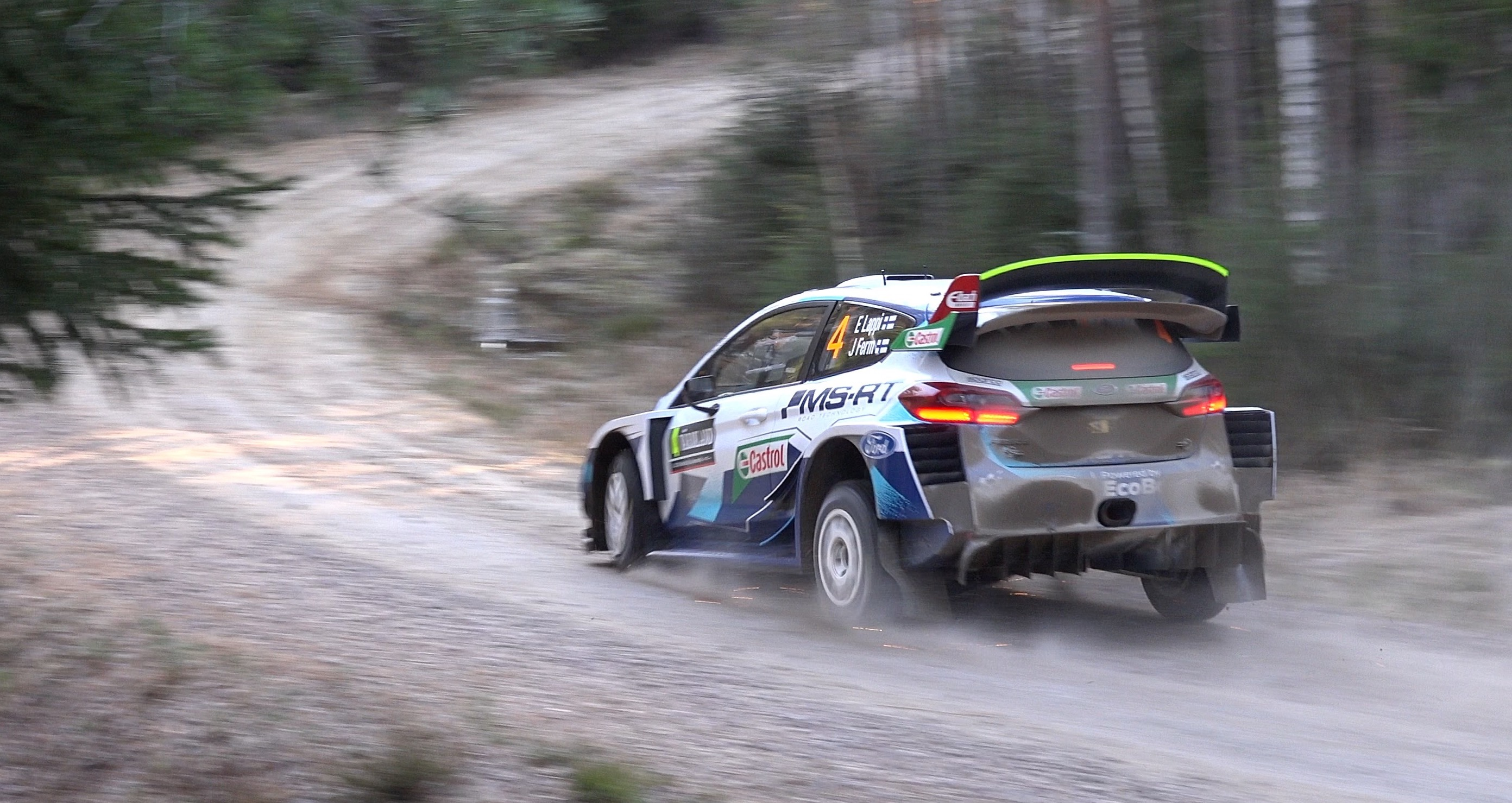
A lack of snow forced the Rally Sweden to be shortened.

As championship leaders, Neuville and Gilsoul became the first crew on the road in Sweden. This saw them struggle throughout the weekend as their road position meant they swept loose gravel away from the faster road base underneath, which was further complicated by the rally being shortened due to a lack of snow. The rally was eventually won by Evans and Martin. They dominated the rally, winning five stages out of nine, to take victory; Evans' second and a first for Martin. They then led both drivers' and co-drivers' standings for the first time in their careers. Their teammate Kalle Rovanperä recorded his first stage win at the sport's highest level when he and co-driver Jonne Halttunen won the Power Stage. Rovanperä and Halttunen also achieved their maiden podium finish. At the age of nineteen, Rovanperä became the youngest driver ever to claim a WRC podium finish.

As the championship continued on to Latin America, the world began to feel the effects of the COVID-19 pandemic. Although the Rally Mexico began as planned, the final leg of the rally was cancelled to allow teams enough time to return to their home bases in Europe before travel restrictions came into effect. This meant the rally was shortened to two legs. Tänak and Järveoja were leading the first leg until suspension damage saw them drop over forty seconds. Neuville and Gilsoul were running third overall, but they had to retire from the day with electrical problem. Hyundai's third entry of Dani Sordo and Carlos del Barrio suffered a radiator pipe issue on the morning loop of Friday which lost them five minutes, and they ultimately retired with a terminal engine fault. Esapekka Lappi and Janne Ferm also retired when their Fiesta caught fire. Ogier and Ingrassia enjoyed a trouble-free weekend and won their first rally of the season. With a consistent performance in the early season, the six-time world champions took an early lead in the championships. The result also saw Toyota expand their lead in the manufacturers' championship, twenty-one points ahead of defending manufacturer champions Hyundai.

=== Season resumption ===
The season restarted in the calendar newcomer Estonia. The rally marked the return of the FIA World Rally Championship after a half-year hiatus caused by the COVID-19 pandemic and was the 600th event since the championship was founded back in 1973. Winning the warm-up event, local favourites Tänak and Järveoja were determined to prevail their home soil for the third straight year. The reigning world champions showed impressive speed throughout the weekend, leading almost the entire rally to win their first rally for Hyundai in their home country. Teammate Neuville and Gilsoul had another weekend to forget. The Belgian crew retired on Saturday afternoon after they damaged their rear-right suspension. Things went from bad to worse after rejoining the rally on Sunday as another electrical issue in the penultimate stage meant no chance for consolation points from the Power Stage. Hyundai's third entry of Craig Breen and Paul Nagle finished second after a consistent performance to complete a Hyundai 1–2. Rovanperä became the youngest driver to lead a WRC rally at the age of nineteen when he was briefly leading the event at an early stage, but a one-minute time penalty was given after his co-driver Halttunen illegally removed the radiator blanking plate. Takamoto Katsuta and Daniel Barritt were running fifth overall until they rolled their Yaris on Sunday morning. The Japanese driver lost what would've been a career-best finish. Pierre-Louis Loubet and Vincent Landais also retired from their top-class debut as they broke their steering.

Moving to Rally Turkey, where crews had to face the challenge of rock storms, Sébastien Loeb and Daniel Elena took an early lead on Friday. At the age of forty-six, Loeb became the oldest driver to lead a WRC event. Saturday saw reigning world champions Tänak and Järveoja retire from the day. The Estonian crew's i20 speared off the road because of a steering issue. Ogier and Ingrassia led the rally on Saturday morning until a puncture and hydraulics issue dropped them over half a minute, which gave the lead to Neuville and Gilsoul. Sunday's first pass through the Çetibeli stage saw tyre dramas, with five crews suffering punctures, including the crew of Neuville and Gilsoul, Loeb and Elena, Ogier and Ingrassia, Rovanperä and Halttunen, and Lappi and Ferm, with two more crews retiring from the rally. This massively changed the overall rally standings—Evans and Martin moved up three places to become the new rally leaders. By contrast, teammate Ogier and Ingrassia's weekend went even worse. The engine of the French crew's Toyota Yaris caught fire during the second test through Çetibeli. The six-time world champions had no choice but to stop in the stage and retire from the rally. Eventually, Evans and Martin safely complete the event to record a second win of the season with a margin of over thirty seconds over Neuville and Gilsoul, who won the Power Stage. Without retirements, Evans and Martin regained the championship lead. Gus Greensmith and Elliott Edmondson were the leading M-Sport crew. They had a rather trouble-free rally to finish a career-high fifth place.

=== Closing rounds ===
The thin layer of slippery gravel of Sardegna meant a late road position would be helpful for a good result. Sordo and del Barrio made full use of this advantage to build a commanding lead of over thirty seconds going onto Sunday. The Spanish crew eventually won the rally for the second straight year although their i20's rear subframe was inspected and deemed to be underweight post-race. There was an epic battle for the runner-up spot between the crew of Neuville and Gilsoul and world champions Ogier and Ingrassia, with Neuville and Gilsoul ultimately coming out on top. The top three crews were separated by only 6.1 seconds, the smallest margin to cover the podium places in WRC history. With a 1-2 finish, Hyundai reclaimed the championship lead. Rovanperä and Halttunen had a weekend to forget. The Finnish crew first rolled their Yaris in the Shakedown on Thursday, and then retired from the rally on Saturday when they crashed out. Lappi and Ferm also retired from the event due to a terminal engine failure. A suspension issue saw reigning world champions Tänak and Järveoja only manage to complete the rally in sixth position, but they won the Power Stage to score five bonus points. Pierre-Louis Loubet and Vincent Landais enjoyed a trouble-free weekend, scoring their first points in a World Rally Car by finishing seventh overall.

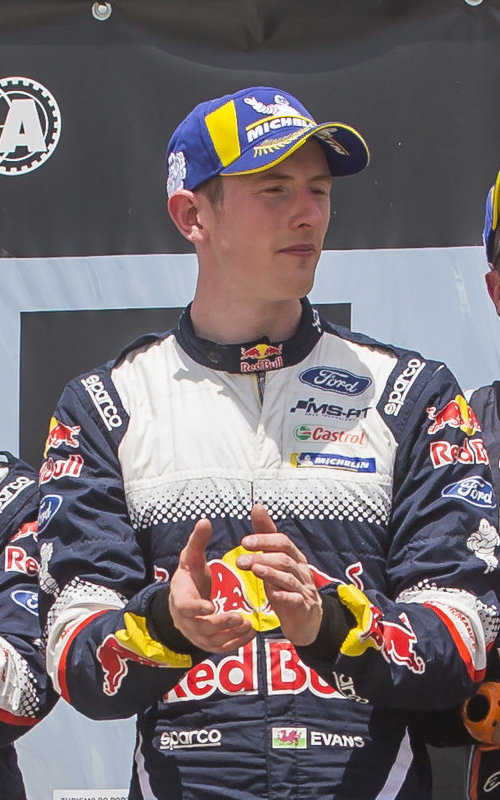
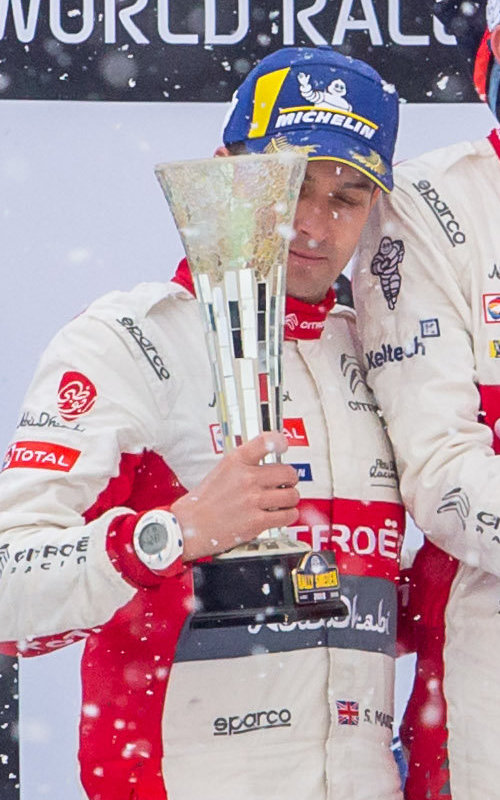
Elfyn Evans (left) and Scott Martin (right) were leading the drivers' and co-drivers' championships throughout almost an entire season, but an error in the final round cost them both titles.

The championship finished in Monza, featuring tricky weather conditions, which spelt trouble for all terms. The very first stage saw Katsuta and Barritt overshoot a corner and crash into a wall. Neuville and Gilsoul had a mathematical chance of winning the titles coming to the event, but it was smashed during the fourth stage when a pool of heavy standing water drowned out their car as their i20's right-front suspension was damaged earlier in the stage. Greensmith and Edmondson were caught out during the first test of Saturday's afternoon loop, while Ole Christian Veiby and Jonas Andersson also retired from the rally at the same spot after a violent crash. The very next stage saw championship leader Evans and Martin go off the road on the icy and slushy surface, which left the championship wide open. The other major retirement of the rally was the M-Sport Ford crew of Teemu Suninen and Jarmo Lehtinen. An unfixable misfiring engine led their season to an early end. Ogier and Ingrassia were the crew who won the season's finale after overcoming a limited-visibility issue. Benefiting from their rivals' retirements, the French crew won their seventh world titles. Hyundai had a 2–3 finish in the final weekend, which was enough to secure their second consecutive manufacturers' title.

== Results and standings ==
=== Season summary ===
Round	Event	Winning driver	Winning co-driver	Winning entrant	Winning time	Report	Ref.
1	(Monaco) Rallye Automobile Monte Carlo	(Belgium) Thierry Neuville	(Belgium) Nicolas Gilsoul	(South Korea) Hyundai Shell Mobis WRT	3:10:57.6	Report	
2	Rally Sweden	(United Kingdom) Elfyn Evans	(United Kingdom) Scott Martin	(Japan) Toyota Gazoo Racing WRT	1:11:43.1	Report	
3	(Mexico) Rally Guanajuato México	(France) Sébastien Ogier	(France) Julien Ingrassia	(Japan) Toyota Gazoo Racing WRT	2:47:47.6	Report	
4	Rally Estonia	(Estonia) Ott Tänak	(Estonia) Martin Järveoja	(South Korea) Hyundai Shell Mobis WRT	1:59:53.6	Report	
5	Marmaris Rally of Turkey	(United Kingdom) Elfyn Evans	(United Kingdom) Scott Martin	(Japan) Toyota Gazoo Racing WRT	2:43:02.7	Report	
6	(Italy) Rally Italia Sardegna	(Spain) Dani Sordo	(Spain) Carlos del Barrio	(South Korea) Hyundai Shell Mobis WRT	2:41:37.5	Report	
7	(Italy) ACI Rally Monza	(France) Sébastien Ogier	(France) Julien Ingrassia	(Japan) Toyota Gazoo Racing WRT	2:15:51.0	Report	

=== Scoring system ===
Points were awarded to the top ten classified finishers in each event. In the manufacturers' championship, teams were eligible to nominate three crews to score points, but these points were only awarded to the top two classified finishers representing a manufacturer and driving a 2017-specification World Rally Car. There were also five bonus points awarded to the winners of the Power Stage, four points for second place, three for third, two for fourth and one for fifth. Power Stage points were only awarded in the drivers' and co-drivers' championships.

Position	1st	2nd	3rd	4th	5th	6th	7th	8th	9th	10th
Points	25	18	15	12	10	8	6	4	2	1

=== FIA World Rally Championship for Drivers ===
Pos.	Driver	MON (Monaco)	SWE (Sweden)	MEX (Note: The Power Stage was removed from the Rally Mexico route as the final leg was cancelled.) (Mexico)	EST (Estonia)	TUR (Turkey)	ITA (Italy)	MNZ (Italy)	Points
1	(France) Sébastien Ogier	2^{2}	4^{3}	1	3^{4}	Ret	3^{3}	1	122
2	(United Kingdom) Elfyn Evans	3^{4}	1	4	4^{2}	1^{4}	4^{4}	29^{3}	114
3	(Estonia) Ott Tänak	Ret	2^{4}	2	1^{3}	17^{2}	6^{1}	2^{2}	105
4	(Belgium) Thierry Neuville	1^{1}	6^{2}	16	Ret	2^{1}	2^{2}	Ret	87
5	(Finland) Kalle Rovanperä	5	3^{1}	5	5^{1}	4^{3}	Ret	5	80
6	(Finland) Esapekka Lappi	4^{5}	5^{5}	Ret	7	6	Ret	4^{4}	52
7	(Finland) Teemu Suninen	8^{3}	8	3	6	Ret	5	Ret	44
8	(Spain) Dani Sordo			Ret			1^{5}	3^{5}	42
9	(Republic of Ireland) Craig Breen		7		2^{5}				25
10	(France) Sébastien Loeb	6				3^{5}			24
11	(United Kingdom) Gus Greensmith	63		9	8	5	25	Ret	16
12	(Sweden) Pontus Tidemand		15	6	15	8	10	10	14
13	(Japan) Takamoto Katsuta	7	9		Ret		Ret	20^{1}	13
14	(Finland) Jari Huttunen		10		11		8	8	9
15	(Norway) Andreas Mikkelsen							6	8
16	(Poland) Kajetan Kajetanowicz			14	Ret	7	9	14	8
17	(Sweden) Oliver Solberg	25	17	Ret	9		18	7	8
18	(Russia) Nikolay Gryazin	16	21	7	19		Ret		6
19	(France) Pierre-Louis Loubet				Ret	Ret	7		6
20	(Bolivia) Marco Bulacia Wilkinson			8	14	10	11	16	5
21	(Norway) Mads Østberg	10	12		10		14	9	4
22	(France) Adrien Fourmaux	15	18		13	9	Ret	49	2
23	(France) Eric Camilli	9					Ret		2
24	(Norway) Ole Christian Veiby	Ret	13	10	Ret		12	Ret	1
Pos.	Driver	MON (Monaco)	SWE (Sweden)	MEX (Mexico)	EST (Estonia)	TUR (Turkey)	ITA (Italy)	MNZ (Italy)	Points

Key
Colour	Result
Gold	Winner
Silver	2nd place
Bronze	3rd place
Green	Points finish
Blue	Non-points finish
Blue	Non-classified finish (NC)
Purple	Did not finish (Ret)
Black	Excluded (EX)
Black	Disqualified (DSQ)
White	Did not start (DNS)
White	Cancelled (C)
Blank	Withdrew entry from the event (WD)

Notes:
^{1 2 3 4 5} – Power Stage position

=== FIA World Rally Championship for Co-Drivers ===
Pos.	Co-Driver	MON (Monaco)	SWE (Sweden)	MEX (Mexico)	EST (Estonia)	TUR (Turkey)	ITA (Italy)	MNZ (Italy)	Points
1	(France) Julien Ingrassia	2^{2}	4^{3}	1	3^{4}	Ret	3^{3}	1	122
2	(United Kingdom) Scott Martin	3^{4}	1	4	4^{2}	1^{4}	4^{4}	29^{3}	114
3	(Estonia) Martin Järveoja	Ret	2^{4}	2	1^{3}	17^{2}	6^{1}	2^{2}	105
4	(Belgium) Nicolas Gilsoul	1^{1}	6^{2}	16	Ret	2^{1}	2^{2}	Ret	87
5	(Finland) Jonne Halttunen	5	3^{1}	5	5^{1}	4^{3}	Ret	5	80
6	(Finland) Janne Ferm	4^{5}	5^{5}	Ret	7	6	Ret	4^{4}	52
7	(Finland) Jarmo Lehtinen	8^{3}	8	3	6	Ret	5	Ret	44
8	(Spain) Carlos del Barrio			Ret			1^{5}	3^{5}	42
9	(Republic of Ireland) Paul Nagle		7		2^{5}				25
10	(Monaco) Daniel Elena	6				3^{5}			24
11	(United Kingdom) Elliott Edmondson	63		9	8	5	25	Ret	16
12	(Sweden) Patrik Barth		15	6	15	8	10	10	14
13	(United Kingdom) Daniel Barritt	7	9		Ret		Ret	20^{1}	13
14	(Finland) Mikko Lukka		10		11		8	8	9
15	(Norway) Anders Jæger-Amland							6	8
16	(Poland) Maciej Szczepaniak			14	Ret	7	9	14	8
17	(Republic of Ireland) Aaron Johnston	25	17	Ret	9		18	7	8
18	(Russia) Yaroslav Fedorov	16	21	7	36				6
19	(France) Vincent Landais				Ret	Ret	7		6
20	(Norway) Torstein Eriksen	10	12		10		14	9	4
21	(Italy) Giovanni Bernacchini			8		Ret		Ret	4
22	(Belgium) Renaud Jamoul	15	18		13	9	Ret	49	2
23	(France) François-Xavier Buresi	9					Ret		2
24	(Argentina) Marcelo Der Ohannesian				14	10	11	16	1
25	(Sweden) Jonas Andersson	Ret	13	10	Ret		12	Ret	1
Pos.	Co-Driver	MON (Monaco)	SWE (Sweden)	MEX (Mexico)	EST (Estonia)	TUR (Turkey)	ITA (Italy)	MNZ (Italy)	Points

Key
Colour	Result
Gold	Winner
Silver	2nd place
Bronze	3rd place
Green	Points finish
Blue	Non-points finish
Blue	Non-classified finish (NC)
Purple	Did not finish (Ret)
Black	Excluded (EX)
Black	Disqualified (DSQ)
White	Did not start (DNS)
White	Cancelled (C)
Blank	Withdrew entry from the event (WD)

Notes:
^{1 2 3 4 5} – Power Stage position

=== FIA World Rally Championship for Manufacturers ===
Only the best two results of each manufacturer at each rally were taken into account for the World Manufacturers’ Championship.

Pos.	Manufacturer	MON (Monaco)	SWE (Sweden)	MEX (Mexico)	EST (Estonia)	TUR (Turkey)	ITA (Italy)	MNZ (Italy)	Points
1	(South Korea) Hyundai Shell Mobis WRT	1	2	2	1	2	1	2	241
1	(South Korea) Hyundai Shell Mobis WRT	5	5	6	2	3	2	3	241
2	(Japan) Toyota Gazoo Racing WRT	2	1	1	3	1	3	1	236
2	(Japan) Toyota Gazoo Racing WRT	3	3	4	4	4	4	5	236
3	(United Kingdom) M-Sport Ford WRT	4	4	3	5	5	5	4	129
3	(United Kingdom) M-Sport Ford WRT	6	6	5	6	6	7	Ret	129
4	(France) Hyundai 2C Competition				Ret	Ret	6	Ret	8
Pos.	Manufacturer	MON (Monaco)	SWE (Sweden)	MEX (Mexico)	EST (Estonia)	TUR (Turkey)	ITA (Italy)	MNZ (Italy)	Points

Key
Colour	Result
Gold	Winner
Silver	2nd place
Bronze	3rd place
Green	Points finish
Blue	Non-points finish
Blue	Non-classified finish (NC)
Purple	Did not finish (Ret)
Black	Excluded (EX)
Black	Disqualified (DSQ)
White	Did not start (DNS)
White	Cancelled (C)
Blank	Withdrew entry from the event (WD)
