= 2020 Rally Argentina =

2020 edition of Rally Argentina

2020 Rally Argentina: 40. Speedagro Rally Argentina
- Part of the 2020 World Rally Championship
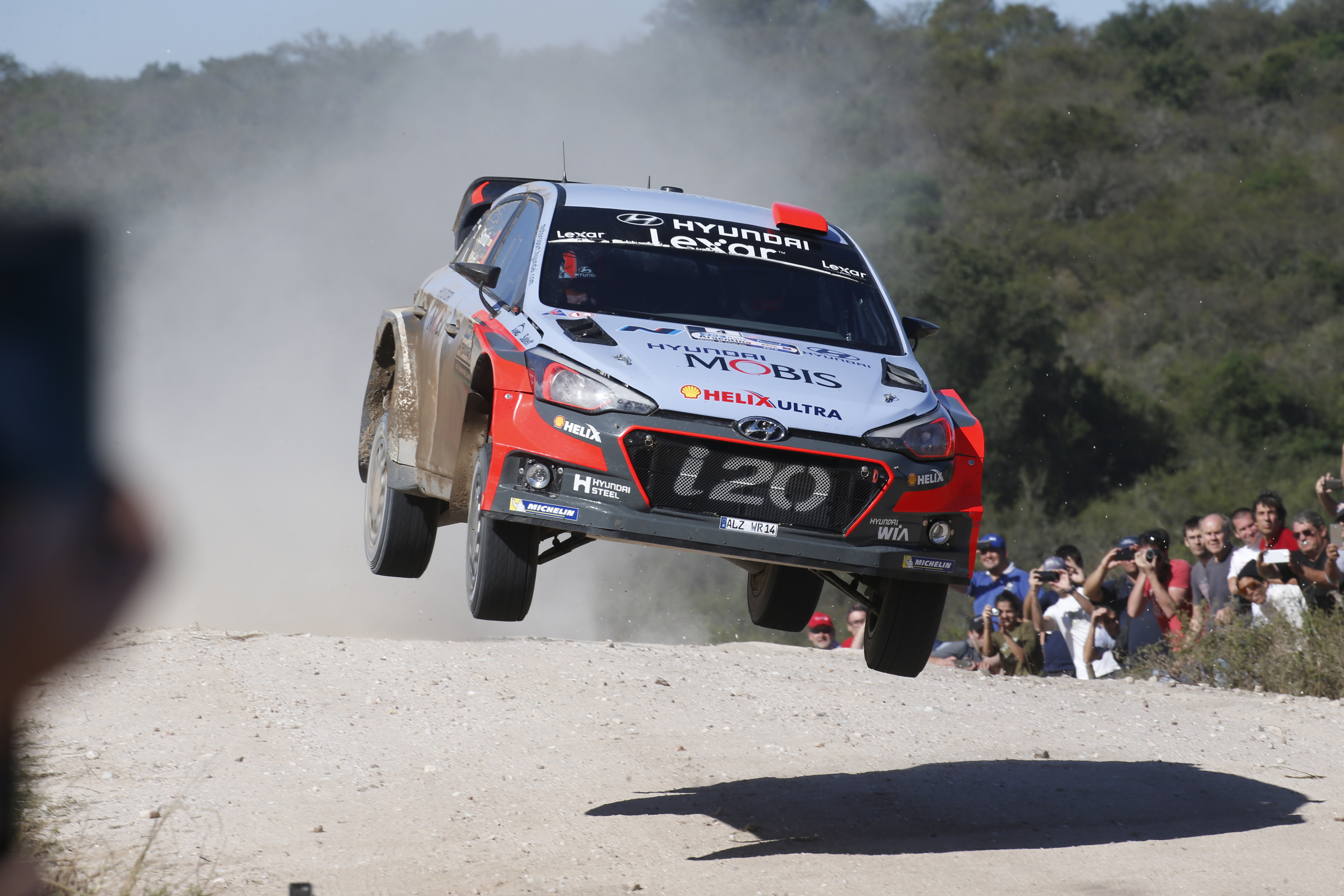
- Rally Argentina features with vast pampas plains, rugged mountains and softer lakeland landscapes.
- Host country: Argentina
- Rally base: Villa Carlos Paz, Córdoba
- Dates run: Scheduled for 23 April 2020 – Scheduled for 26 April 2020
- Start location: Villa Carlos Paz, Córdoba
- Finish location: El Cóndor, Córdoba
- Stages: 16 (322.36 km; 200.31 miles)
- Stage surface: Gravel
- Transport distance: 1,072.70 km (666.54 miles)
- Overall distance: 1,395.06 km (866.85 miles)

Statistics
- Cancellation: Rally cancelled due to COVID-19 pandemic.

The 2020 Rally Argentina (also known as the Speedagro Rally Argentina 2020) was a motor racing event for rally cars that was scheduled to be held over four days between 23 and 26 April 2020, but had to be cancelled due to the COVID-19 pandemic. The 2020 event was set to base in Villa Carlos Paz in Córdoba Province and consist of sixteen special stages with a total competitive distance of 322.36 km (200.31 mi).

Thierry Neuville and Nicolas Gilsoul are the defending rally winners. Their team, Hyundai Shell Mobis WRT, are the manufacturers' winners. Mads Østberg and Torstein Eriksen are the defending winners in the World Rally Championship-2 category. (Note: The championship was known as the World Rally Championship-2 Pro in 2019.) In the World Rally Championship-3 category, Pedro Heller and Marc Martí are the reigning rally winners. (Note: The championship was known as the World Rally Championship-2 in 2019.)

== Background ==
=== Route ===
The second leg is revised.

==== Itinerary ====
All dates and times are ART (UTC-3).

Date	Time	No.	Stage name	Distance
N/A	09:01	—	Villa Carlos Paz [Shakedown]	4.25 km
Leg 1 — 122.96 km
N/A	19:08	SS1	SSS Villa Carlos Paz	1.90 km
N/A	09:13	SS2	Las Bajadas — Villa del Dique 1	16.65 km
N/A	10:00	SS3	Amboy — Yacanto 1	20.44 km
N/A	10:45	SS4	Santa Rosa — San Agustin 1	23.44 km
N/A	14:48	SS5	Las Bajadas — Villa del Dique 2	16.65 km
N/A	15:35	SS6	Amboy — Yacanto 2	20.44 km
N/A	16:20	SS7	Santa Rosa — San Agustin 2	23.44 km
Leg 2 — 146.24 km
N/A	08:08	SS8	Capilla del Monte — San Marcos 1	23.80 km
N/A	09:31	SS9	San Marcos — San Gregorio 1	21.09 km
N/A	10:09	SS10	La Cañada — Rio Pinto 1	28.23 km
N/A	14:38	SS11	Capilla del Monte — San Marcos 2	23.80 km
N/A	15:31	SS12	San Marcos — San Gregorio 2	21.09 km
N/A	16:19	SS13	La Cañada — Rio Pinto 2	28.23 km
Leg 3 — 53.16 km
N/A	09:38	SS14	Copina — El Cóndor (Note: SS14 and S16 are the same stage, but are known by different stage names.)	16.43 km
N/A	10:27	SS15	Mina Clavero — Giulio Cesare	20.30 km
N/A	12:18	SS16	El Cóndor [Power Stage]	16.43 km

== Notes ==
Previous rally: N/A	2020 FIA World Rally Championship	Next rally: N/A
Previous rally: 2019 Rally Argentina	2020 Rally Argentina	Next rally: 2021 Rally Argentina
