= 2011 Chihuahua Express =

Open-road race edition

The 2011 Chihuahua Express was the fifth edition of the Chihuahua Express. Michel Jourdain Jr. won this event in a Studebaker.

== Results ==
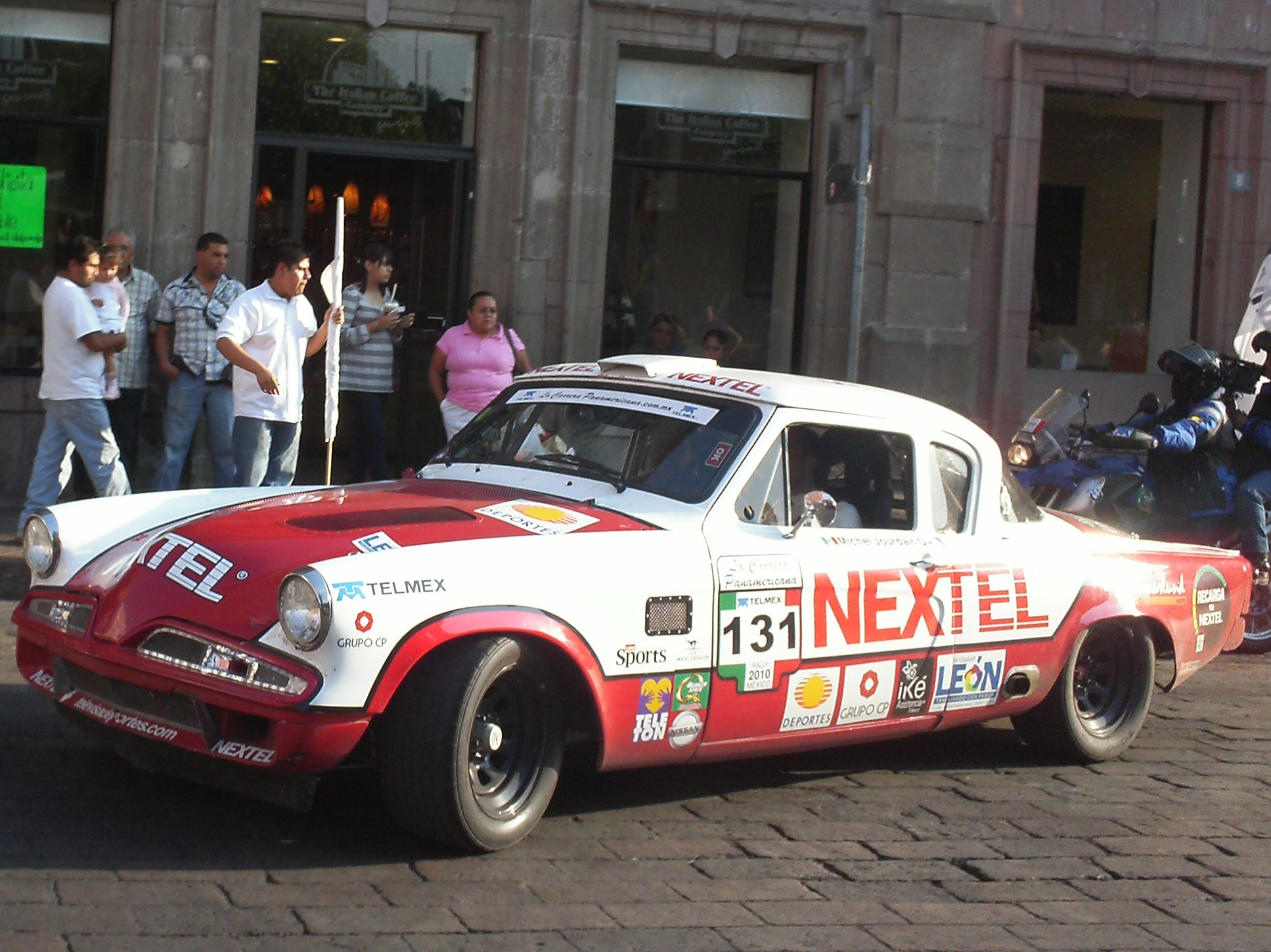
Michel Jourdain Chihuahua Express winner

23 of 34 teams finished the race.

Pos	Driver	Co-driver	Car	Category	Time	Gap	Speed
1	(Mexico) Michel Jourdain Jr.	(Mexico) Mauricio Pimentel	Studebaker	Turismo Mayor	3:05:37.6	-	143.24
2	(United States) Doug Mockett	(Mexico) Angélica Fuentes	Oldsmobile	Turismo Mayor	3:10:47.1	5:09.5	139.37
3	(United States) Edward R. Hugo	(Mexico) Marco Hernandez	Dodge	Unlimited	3:17:12.9	11:35.3	134.83
4	(Mexico) Luis Richerand	(Mexico) Fabián Baena	Mitsubishi	1.6 - 2.5 T	3:17:12.9	11:42.3	134.83
5	(Mexico) Ceferino Gómez	(Mexico) Ezequiel Gómez	Mitsubishi	1.6 - 2.5 T	3:17:25.3	11:47.7	134.75
5	(Mexico) Justo Sierra	(Mexico) Martina Franz	VW Golf	-2.5 T	3:32:21.1	26:43.5	125.22
6	(Canada) Stewart Robertson	(Canada) Linda Robertson	Studebaker	Turismo Mayor	3:37:06.8	31:29.2	122.47
7	(United States) Steve Waldman	(Mexico) Felipe Arguelles	Mitsubishi	1.6 - 2.5 T	3:40:44.2	35:06.6	120.46
8	(Mexico) Enrique Montaño	(Mexico) Mauricio Cabrera G.	Porsche	Historic B	3:41:32.4	35:54.8	120.03
9	(United States) Gerie Bledsoe	(Mexico) Fernando García	Chevrolet	Historic C	3:42:28.7	36:51.1	119.51
10	(United States) John Rogers	(United States) C J Strupp	Ford	Historic C	3:42:55.9	37:18.3	119.27

== Special stage ==
Day	Stage	Name	Length	Winner	Time	Avg. spd.	Rally leader
Day 1 (April 8)	SS1	TC 3	34.54	(Mexico) Michel Jourdain Jr.	17:16.7	119.90 km/h	(Mexico) Michel Jourdain Jr.
Day 1 (April 8)	SS2	TC 4	10.85	(Mexico) Michel Jourdain Jr.	3:45.0	173.60 km/h	(Mexico) Michel Jourdain Jr.
Day 1 (April 8)	SS3	TC 5	9.49	(United States) Doug Mockett	3:45.0	161.15 km/h	(Mexico) Michel Jourdain Jr.
Day 1 (April 8)	SS4	TC 6	8.89	(Mexico) Michel Jourdain Jr.	3:28.5	153.19 km/h	(Mexico) Michel Jourdain Jr.
Day 1 (April 8)	SS5	TC 7	8.08	(Mexico) Michel Jourdain Jr.	3:00.6	160.70 km/h	(Mexico) Michel Jourdain Jr.
Day 1 (April 8)	SS6	TC 10	8.48	(Mexico) Michel Jourdain Jr.	3:10.4	160.67 km/h	(Mexico) Michel Jourdain Jr.
Day 1 (April 8)	SS7	TC 11	8.86	(Mexico) Michel Jourdain Jr.	3:25.5	155.59 km/h	(Mexico) Michel Jourdain Jr.
Day 1 (April 8)	SS8	TC 12	9.61	(Mexico) Michel Jourdain Jr.	3:33.8	161.66 km/h	(Mexico) Michel Jourdain Jr.
Day 1 (April 8)	SS9	TC 13	9.90	(Mexico) Juan José Stanglemaier (Switzerland) Charles Firmenich	3:14.9	182.76 km/h	(Mexico) Michel Jourdain Jr.
Day 1 (April 8)	SS10	TC 14	34.44	(Mexico) Michel Jourdain Jr.	17:14.4	119.90 km/h	(Mexico) Michel Jourdain Jr.
Day 2 (April 9)	SS11	TC 2	12.12	(Mexico) Michel Jourdain Jr.	4:54.0	148.08 km/h	(Mexico) Michel Jourdain Jr.
Day 2 (April 9)	SS12	TC 3	13.32	(Mexico) Michel Jourdain Jr.	5:14.0	152.71 km/h	(Mexico) Michel Jourdain Jr.
Day 2 (April 9)	SS13	TC 6	11.36	(Mexico) Michel Jourdain Jr.	5:35.7	121.71 km/h	(Mexico) Michel Jourdain Jr.
Day 2 (April 9)	SS14	TC 7	17.56	(Mexico) Michel Jourdain Jr.	8:19.7	126.43 km/h	(Mexico) Michel Jourdain Jr.
Day 2 (April 9)	SS15	TC 8	8.46	(Mexico) Michel Jourdain Jr.	3:48.2	133.57 km/h	(Mexico) Michel Jourdain Jr.
Day 2 (April 9)	SS16	TC 9	11.45	(Mexico) Michel Jourdain Jr.	5:26.1	126.42 km/h	(Mexico) Michel Jourdain Jr.
Day 2 (April 9)	SS17	TC 11	12.41	(Mexico) Michel Jourdain Jr.	5:29.2	135.79 km/h	(Mexico) Michel Jourdain Jr.
Day 2 (April 9)	SS18	TC 12	8.62	(Mexico) Michel Jourdain Jr.	3:48.9	135.51 km/h	(Mexico) Michel Jourdain Jr.
Day 2 (April 9)	SS19	TC 13	17.20	(Mexico) Michel Jourdain Jr.	8:01.0	128.73 km/h	(Mexico) Michel Jourdain Jr.
Day 2 (April 9)	SS20	TC 14	11.14	(Mexico) Michel Jourdain Jr.	5:27.5	122.26 km/h	(Mexico) Michel Jourdain Jr.
Day 2 (April 9)	SS21	TC 17	14.01	(Mexico) Michel Jourdain Jr.	5:27.3	154.23 km/h	(Mexico) Michel Jourdain Jr.
Day 2 (April 9)	SS22	TC 18	11.92	(Mexico) Michel Jourdain Jr.	4:40.7	152.71 km/h	(Mexico) Michel Jourdain Jr.
Day 3 (April 10)	SS23	TC 2	15.20	(United States) Doug Mockett	5:24.4	168.88 km/h	(Mexico) Michel Jourdain Jr.
Day 3 (April 10)	SS24	TC 3	9.22	(Mexico) Michel Jourdain Jr.	3:07.5	177.49 km/h	(Mexico) Michel Jourdain Jr.
Day 3 (April 10)	SS25	TC 4	33.72	(Mexico) Michel Jourdain Jr.	13:09.0	153.85 km/h	(Mexico) Michel Jourdain Jr.
Day 3 (April 10)	SS26	TC 5	5.07	(Mexico) Michel Jourdain Jr.	2:10.4	140.40 km/h	(Mexico) Michel Jourdain Jr.
Day 3 (April 10)	SS27	TC 5	11.98	(Mexico) Michel Jourdain Jr.	5:08.8	139.57 km/h	(Mexico) Michel Jourdain Jr.
Day 3 (April 10)	SS28	TC 9	11.71	(Mexico) Michel Jourdain Jr.	5:03.4	139.12 km/h	(Mexico) Michel Jourdain Jr.
Day 3 (April 10)	SS29	TC 10	5.10	(Mexico) Michel Jourdain Jr.	2:08.2	143.43 km/h	(Mexico) Michel Jourdain Jr.
Day 3 (April 10)	SS30	TC 11	33.88	(Mexico) Michel Jourdain Jr.	12:17.5	165.26 km/h	(Mexico) Michel Jourdain Jr.
Day 3 (April 10)	SS31	TC 12	9.20	(Mexico) Michel Jourdain Jr.	3:13.8	170.72 km/h	(Mexico) Michel Jourdain Jr.
Day 3 (April 10)	SS32	TC 13	15.39	(United States) Doug Mockett	5:42.0	162.00 km/h	(Mexico) Michel Jourdain Jr.
