= 2009 International Rally of Nations =

The International Rally of Nations is an international rally event held in Mexico for the first time in 2009.

According to the organization, "the idea of this event is to bring the emotional side of the Olympic Games or the world cup to the automobile world with the possibility of several teams per country." The idea for the event came after the Rally Mexico was not included in the 2009 World Rally Championship due to the rotation system.

The event was won by Spain's Xavier Pons and Daniel Solà, with the two drivers amassing a total of 1067.5 points.

== Format ==
This Rally has a special format since, unlike other rallies, time will not be added stage by stage. Each Special Stage will give points to the top 16 drivers. A team representing a nation will consist of two cars and the points scored by each driver will be added together to determine the Nations Champion.

According to the official rules:

"Points will be awarded to each member of a Team per each Special Stage or Super Special Stage completed. The best-classified crew of each Team will be awarded points as Car 1, the second crew as Car 2. Each crew will be awarded points according to its overall position in the stage classification from the eligible crews (Competing for the Rally of Nations) in each Super Special Stage or Special Stage according to the following scale:"

Position	Car 1	Car 2
1st	45	
2nd	40	30
3rd	36	27
4th	32	24
5th	28	21
6th	24	18
7th	20	15
8th	18	13.5
9th	16	12
10th	14	10.5
11th	12	9
12th	10	7.5
13th	8	6
14th	6	4.5
15th	4	3
16th	2	1

The Team scoring the most points at the end of the Rally will be declared the Winner of the Rally of Nations.

== 2009 Entries ==
There are some very important drivers, including former and/or World Rally Championship, Production World Rally Championship and NACAM Rally Championship champions.

Team	Driver	Codriver	Group	Car
Austria	Manfred Stohl	Ilka Minor	N4	Mitsubishi Lancer Evo
Austria	Andreas Aigner	Daniela Weissengruber	N4	Mitsubishi Lancer Evo
Ecuador	Juan Pablo Villota	Juan Carlos Viteri	A6	Peugeot 206 XS
Ecuador	Camilo Rivera	Juan José Rivera	A6	Peugeot 206 XS
Corona Team Finland	Harri Rovanperä	Jouni Arolainen	N4	Mitsubishi Lancer Evo
Corona Team Finland	Toni Gardemeister	Tomi Tuominen	N4	Mitsubishi Lancer Evo
France	Didier Auriol	Denis Giraudet	N4	Mitsubishi Lancer Evo
France	Brice Tirabassi	Fabrice Gordon	N4	Mitsubishi Lancer Evo
(United Kingdom) Great Britain	Phillip Morrow	Damien Connolly	N4	Mitsubishi Lancer Evo
(United Kingdom) Great Britain	Niall McShea	Marshall Clarke	N4	Mitsubishi Lancer Evo
Germany	Hermann Gassner Jr.	Kathi Wüstenhagen	N4	Mitsubishi Lancer Evo
Germany	Mark Wallenwein	Stefan Kopczyk	N4	Subaru Impreza WRX
(Italy) Pirelli Team Italia	Mario Isola	Roberto Mometti	N4	Mitsubishi Lancer Evo
(Italy) Pirelli Team Italia	Stefano Marrini	Matteo Braga	N4	Mitsubishi Lancer Evo
Mexico 1	Rodrigo Ordóñez	Mauricio Pimentel	N4	Mitsubishi Lancer Evo
Mexico 1	José Cortés	Alex Prieto	N4	Mitsubishi Lancer Evo
Mexico 2	Ricardo Triviño	Checo Salom	N4	Mitsubishi Lancer Evo
Mexico 2	Rodrigo Salgado	Diódoro Salgado	N4	Mitsubishi Lancer Evo
(Mexico) México 3	Francisco Name	Armando Zapata	A6	Peugeot 206 XS
Mexico 3	Guillermo Fonseca	José Alonso López	A6	Peugeot 206 XS
Mexico 3	Jorge González	Jaime Zapata	N2	Renault Clio
Peru	Humberto Tijero	Michael Espinoza	N3	Renault Clio
Peru	Sandro Pestana	Gianpier Giacchetti	A6	Peugeot 206 XS
Spain	Dani Sola	Oscar Sanchez	N4	Mitsubishi Lancer Evo
Spain	Xavier Pons	Alex Haro	N4	Mitsubishi Lancer Evo
Sweden	Patrik Sandell	Emil Axelsson	N4	Mitsubishi Lancer Evo
Sweden	Per-Gunnar Andersson	Anders Fredriksson	N4	Mitsubishi Lancer Evo
Uruguay	Felipe Guelfi	Ignacio Albanell	A6	Peugeot 206 XS
Uruguay	Diego Elola	Pablo Irrazabal	A6	Peugeot 206 XS
United States 1	Matthew Johnson	Chrissie Beavis	N4	Subaru Impreza WRX
United States 1	Kenny Bartram	Dennis Hotson	N4	Subaru Impreza WRX
United States 2	Patrick Moro	Ole Holter	N4	Subaru Impreza STI
United States 2	Piotr Wiktorczyk	Martin Brady	N4	Subaru Impreza WRX
