= Angélica Fuentes =

Mexican business executive

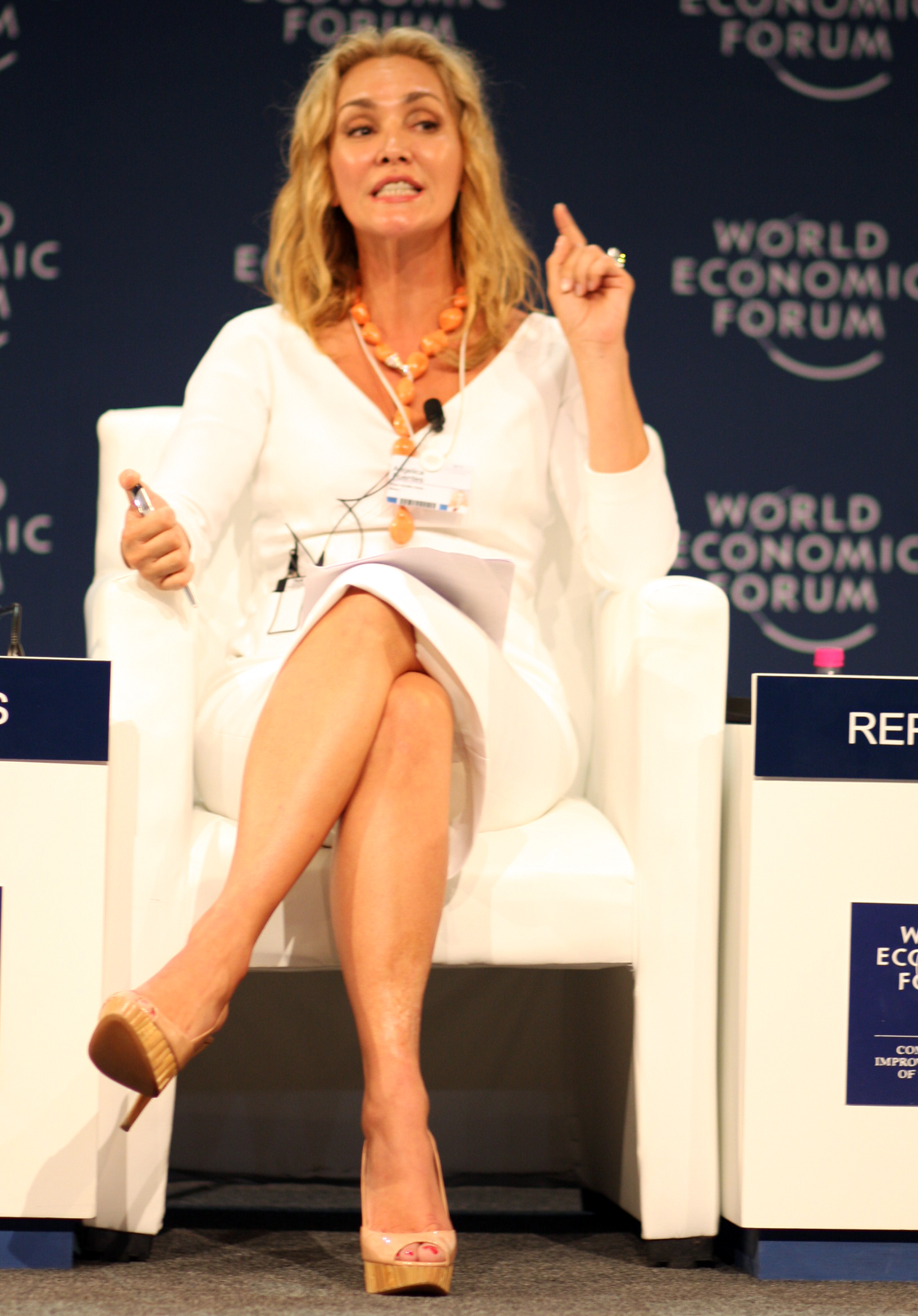
- Born: 2 February 1963; El Paso, Texas, U.S.
- Occupation: Businesswoman

Angélica Fuentes Téllez (El Paso, Texas – February 2, 1963) is a Mexican business executive and was the majority shareholder of Grupo Omnilife-Angelissima-Chivas, a multinational corporation based in Mexico composed of nutrition supplements company Omnilife, beauty and cosmetics brand Angelíssima, and the Mexican soccer team, C.D. Guadalajara, more commonly known as Chivas. She founded Angelíssima in 2010, followed by the Angélica Fuentes Foundation in 2014, dedicated to promoting women's empowerment and achievement of gender equality in Latin America.

== Biography ==
Fuentes is the daughter of Elma Téllez and Valentín Fuentes Varela, a successful businessman in the energy sector. Angélica is the second of six siblings.

She acknowledges her father as being one of her earliest inspirations for her interest in a business career. She began her professional career working in the family business when she was 11, after convincing her father to let her work at one of his company's gas stations. While working at the gas station, she experienced discrimination for being a woman in a male-dominated industry, motivating her to work harder and generate awareness of women's rights and causes.

Angélica attended the University of Texas at El Paso, graduating with a bachelor's degree in finance.

Fuentes served as chairman of the board of Grupo Imperial Corporativo, an important player in the domestic and international energy market, where she worked for 29 years and is still a member of the board.

While General Director of Grupo Imperial Corporativo, she also served as President of the Mexican Natural Gas Association from 1996 to 2000 and as a member of the Natural Gas Council and the American Gas Association. She is currently a board member of the Monterrey Institute of Technology and Advanced Studies at Juarez, as well as that of the Mexican-United States Chamber of Commerce, the Chihuahuan Business Foundation and BBVA Bancomer.

In August 2012, she and her husband Jorge Vergara became the sole owners of the soccer team Chivas USA.

== Distinctions ==
- 2014: 5th in Forbes Mexico's list of Most Powerful Women

== Personal life ==
She was married to the businessman Jorge Vergara from 2008 to 2015. They have two children.
