= Simone Scattolin =

Italian rally co-driver (born 1976)

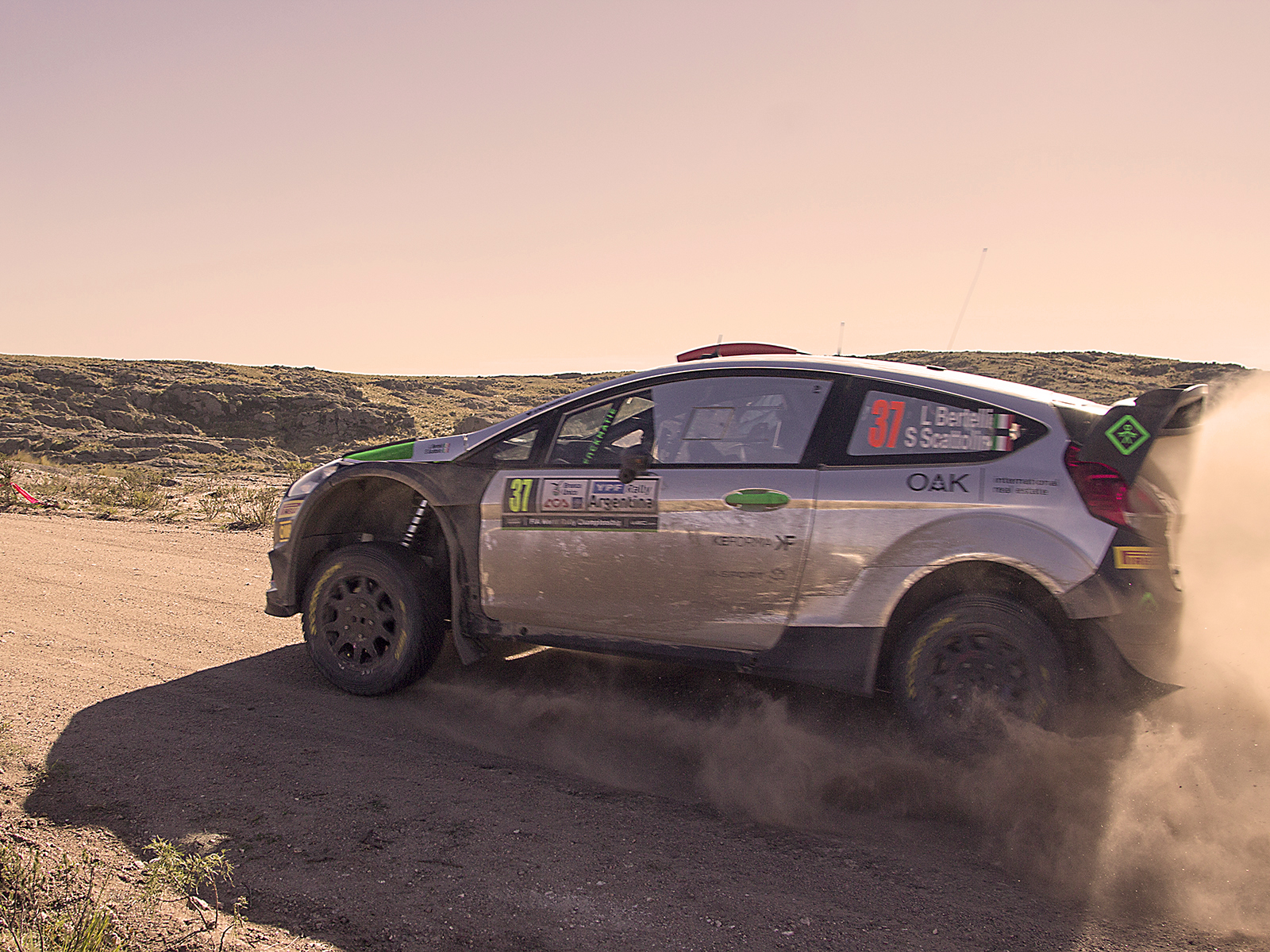

Personal information
- Nationality: (Italy) Italian
- Born: October 1, 1976 (age 50)

World Rally Championship record
- Years active: 2000–2002, 2005–2010, 2013–present
- Teams: M-Sport Ford
- Rallies: 87
- Championships: 0
- Rally wins: 0
- Podiums: 0
- Stage wins: 0
- Total points: 4
- First rally: 2000 Tour de Corse

Simone Scattolin (born 1 October 1976) is an Italian rally co-driver. In addition to be the regular co-driver of Lorenzo Bertelli, he also competes in the European Rally Championship.

== Rally results ==
=== WRC results ===
Year	Entrant	Car	1	2	3	4	5	6	7	8	9	10	11	12	13	14	15	16	WDC	Points
2000	Fabio Frisiero	Mitsubishi Lancer Evo V	MON	SWE	KEN	POR	ESP	ARG	GRE	NZL	FIN	CYP	FRA; 49	ITA	AUS	GBR			NC	0
2001	Fabio Frisiero	Mitsubishi Lancer Evo VI	MON	SWE	POR	ESP; 32	ARG	CYP	GRE; Ret	KEN	FIN	NZL							NC	0
2001	Christian Chemin	Fiat Punto S1600											ITA; Ret			GBR; 43			NC	0
2001	Walter Lamonato	Opel Astra OPC												FRA; 40	AUS				NC	0
2002	Christian Chemin	Fiat Punto S1600	MON; Ret	SWE	FRA	ESP; DSQ	CYP	ARG	GRE; Ret	KEN	FIN	GER; 23	ITA; Ret	NZL	AUS	GBR; Ret			NC	0
2005	Alessandro Bettega	Subaru Impreza STi	MON	SWE	MEX	NZL	ITA; Ret	CYP	TUR	GRE	ARG	FIN	GER						NC	0
2005	Loris Baldacci	Fiat Stilo Abarth												GBR; Ret	JPN	FRA	ESP	AUS	NC	0
2006	Fabio Frisiero	Toyota Corolla WRC	MON	SWE; 43	MEX														NC	0
2006	TRT srl	Ford Fiesta ST				ESP; 45	FRA; 35	ARG	ITA; 38	GRE	GER; 32	FIN; 49	JPN	CYP	TUR	AUS	NZL	GBR; 72	NC	0
2007	Motoring Club	Mitsubishi Lancer Evo IX	MON	SWE; 29				ARG; Ret		GRE; 30			NZL; 25					GBR; 17	NC	0
2007	Motoring Club	Subaru Impreza WRX STi				MEX; Ret													NC	0
2007	TRT srl	Ford Fiesta S1600			NOR; 45		POR; Ret		ITA; Ret										NC	0
2007	TRT srl	Suzuki Ignis S1600									FIN; 32	GER							NC	0
2007	TRT srl	Renault Clio R3												ESP; 39					NC	0
2007	Stobart VK Ford Rally Team	Ford Focus RS WRC													FRA; 11	JPN	IRE		NC	0
2008	Motoring Club	Mitsubishi Lancer Evo IX	MON	SWE; 28	MEX	ARG													NC	0
2008	TRT srl	Renault Clio R3					JOR; Ret	ITA; 17	GRE	TUR	FIN; Ret	GER; 25	NZL	ESP; 17	FRA; Ret	JPN	GBR		NC	0
2009	TRT srl	Renault Clio R3	IRE	NOR	CYP	POR; 34		ITA; 20	GRE	POL	FIN	AUS	ESP	GBR					NC	0
2009	TRT srl	Renault Clio S1600					ARG; 17												NC	0
2010	Hawk Racing Club Srl	Mitsubishi Lancer Evo IX	SWE	MEX	JOR	TUR	NZL	POR	BUL	FIN	GER	JPN	FRA; Ret	ESP	GBR				NC	0
2013	Fabio Frisiero	Mitsubishi Lancer Evo IX	MON	SWE	MEX	POR	ARG	GRE	ITA; 26	FIN	GER	AUS	FRA	ESP					NC	0
2013	Andrea Smiderle	Subaru Impreza STi R4													GBR; 25				NC	0
2014	Fabio Frisiero	Peugeot 207 S2000	MON	SWE; 22	MEX	POR	ARG												NC	0
2014	Fabio Frisiero	Subaru Impreza STi R4						ITA; Ret	POL	FIN	GER								NC	0
2014	Fabio Frisiero	Mitsubishi Lancer Evo IX										AUS; 18	FRA	ESP	GBR				NC	0
2015	ACI Team Italia	Peugeot 208 R2	MON	SWE	MEX	ARG	POR; 47	ITA; 38	POL; 36	FIN; Ret	GER	AUS	FRA	ESP; 20	GBR; 26				NC	0
2016	FWRT s.r.l.	Ford Fiesta RS WRC	MON; Ret	SWE; Ret	MEX; 8	ARG; 13	POR; WD	ITA; Ret	POL; 12	FIN; Ret	GER; WD	CHN; C	FRA; 17	ESP; 11	GBR; 15	AUS; 10			22nd	5
2017	BRC Racing Team	Ford Fiesta R5	MON; Ret																NC	0
2017	FWRT s.r.l.	Ford Fiesta RS WRC		SWE; Ret															NC	0
2017	M-Sport World Rally Team	Ford Fiesta WRC			MEX; 16	FRA	ARG; Ret	POR	ITA	POL	FIN	GER							NC	0
2017	ACI Team Italia	Hyundai i20 R5											ESP; 43	GBR; 24	AUS				NC	0
2018	FWRT s.r.l.	Ford Fiesta WRC	MON	SWE; WD	MEX														NC	0
2018	ACI Team Italia	Škoda Fabia R5				FRA; 11	ARG	POR; 30	ITA; 15	FIN	GER	TUR	GBR	ESP; 19	AUS				NC	0
2019	M-Sport Ford WRT	Ford Fiesta WRC	MON	SWE; 20	MEX			CHL; 13											NC	0
2019	Fabio Andolfi	Škoda Fabia R5				FRA; 11	ARG			ITA; 37	FIN	GER; Ret	TUR	GBR	ESP	AUS; C			NC	0
2019	Enrico Oldrati	Ford Fiesta R2T							POR; Ret										NC	0
2020	Alberto Battistolli	Škoda Fabia Rally2 evo	MON	SWE	MEX	EST	TUR	ITA; 21											NC	0
2020	Franco Morbidelli	Hyundai i20 R5							MNZ; 61										NC	0
2021	M-Sport Ford WRT	Ford Fiesta WRC	MON	ARC; 51	CRO	POR		KEN; 11	EST	BEL	GRE	FIN	ESP	MNZ					NC	0
2021	Alberto Battistolli	Škoda Fabia Rally2 evo					ITA; Ret												NC	0
2022	M-Sport Ford WRT	Ford Puma Rally1	MON	SWE; WD	CRO	POR	ITA	KEN	EST	FIN	BEL	GRE	NZL; WD	ESP	JPN				NC	0
2023	Toyota Gazoo Racing WRT	Toyota GR Yaris Rally1	MON	SWE; 14	MEX	CRO	POR	ITA	KEN	EST	FIN	GRE	CHL	EUR	JPN				NC*	0*

* Season still in progress.
