= Pierre-Louis Loubet =

French rally driver (born 1997)

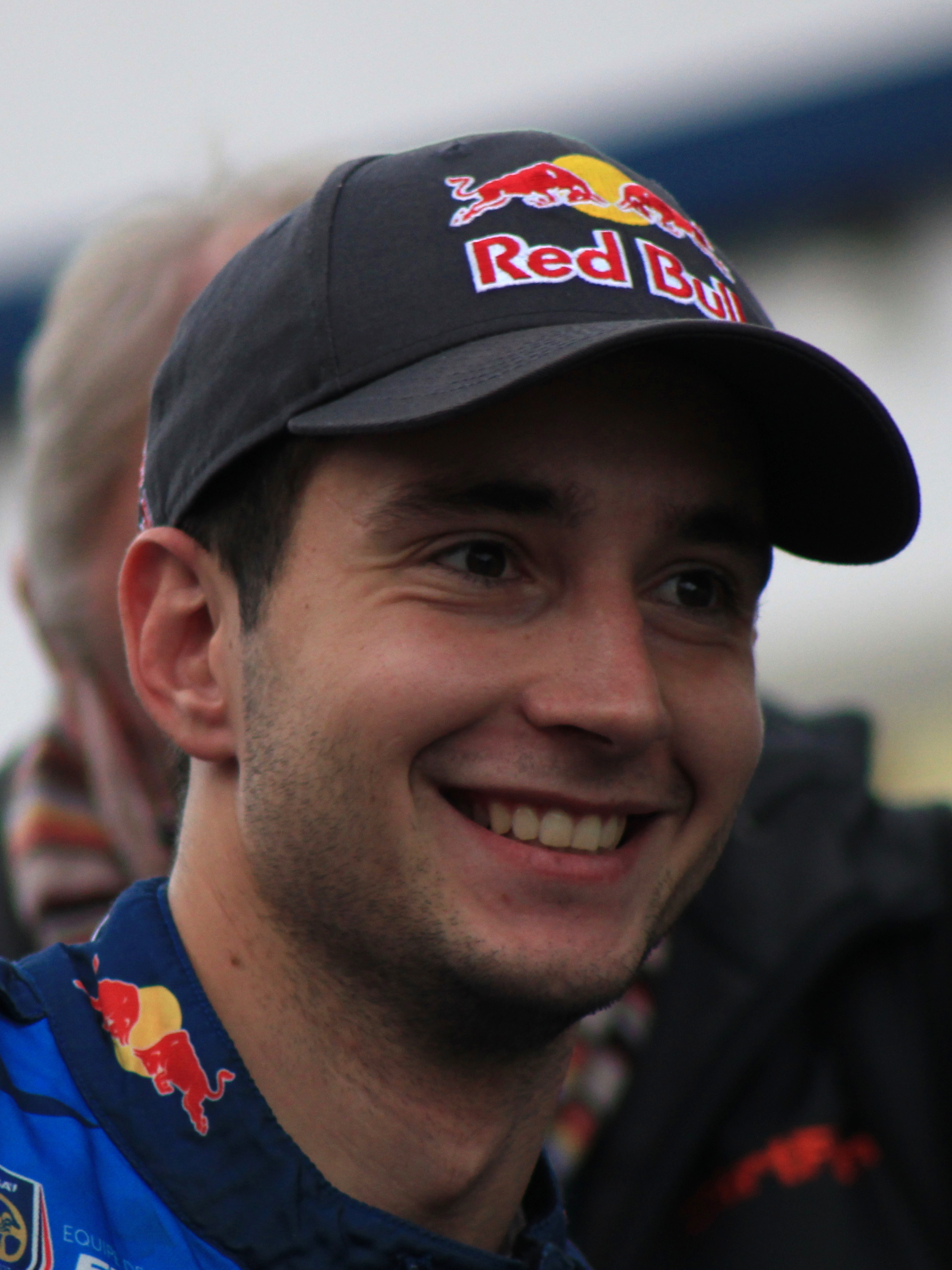
- Loubet at the 2023 Central European Rally

Personal information
- Nationality: (France) French
- Born: 18 February 1997 (age 29); Bastia, France

World Rally Championship record
- Years active: 2015–present
- Co-driver: (France) Victor Bellotto (France) Vincent Landais (France) Florian Haut-Labourdette (Belgium) Nicolas Gilsoul (France) Benjamin Veillas (France) Loris Pascaud
- Rallies: 71
- Championships: 0
- Rally wins: 0
- Podiums: 0
- Stage wins: 4
- Total points: 74
- First rally: 2015 Rally de Portugal
- Last rally: 2025 Rally de Portugal
- Last updated on: 6th August 2025.

Pierre-Louis Loubet (French pronunciation: [pjɛʁ.lwi lu.bɛ]; born 18 February 1997) is a French rally driver. He is the 2019 World Rally Championship 2 Champion. He is the son of the 1989 European Rally Champion Yves Loubet.

== Career ==
=== Early career ===
Loubet started karting at seven years old at the Figari circuit, close to his Porto-Vecchio family residence. After a year of Formula Renault in 2014, he switched to rallying after obtaining his drivers license.

=== Beginnings in rallying (2015) ===
Loubet made his entry into world rallying in the JWRC category in Portugal, where he would finish second in his category with Victor Belotto as a co-driver. After retirements in Finland and Poland, he started the 2015 Tour de Corse with new co-driver Vincent Landais, but would also retire from the rally. He would finish the year with a fifth place in Catalunya and fourth in Wales. He would finish the year sixth overall in the 2015 Junior World Rally Championship.

=== Initial WRC2 Campaign (2016) ===
Loubet started the 2016 WRC-2 campaign on a Peugeot 207 S2000 in Portugal with a retirement, before switching to a Citroën DS3 R5 run by PH Sport. He would then go on to score several points finishes in Sardinia, Poland and Corsica in WRC2, before scoring a podium in Catalunya in the RC2 category.

=== M-Sport (2017) ===
Starting the year with PH Sport in Sweden, Loubet retired due to an engine failure and duly switched to M-Sport and the Ford Fiesta R5, alongside Eric Camilli and Teemu Suninen before Corsica. This would be marked as a consistent year with many points finishes (fourth in Catalunya being the best result), but with no podiums.

=== Hyundai / BRC Racing Team (2018) ===
Hoping to take a step up in 2018, Loubet switched to the new Hyundai i20 R5, driving for BRC Racing Team. He started the year with a limited FIA ERC campaign in the Azores and Canary Islands, both of which were impacted by mechanical and electronical failures, but with a decent pace to show for it. After more issues in Corsica, he would finish a season-best fourth in Portugal, with retirements being the theme of the season in Italy, Germany and Wales.

=== First title (2019) ===
Loubet started 2019 as he had done in 2018 with a two-event European Rally Championship campaign, again in the Azores and Canary Islands. He would have to retire before the final stage with an alternator belt failure, despite being on the podium. In the Canary Islands, a false start penalty would demote him from third to fifth place, but the pace shown in the Skoda was promising. He arrived to Corsica hoping to take a good result at his rally, but small issues would hinder his pace, and he would finish tenth in class. Starting with Portugal however, he went on a consistent and quick pace to win Portugal and Sardinia. He would then go on to finish fourth in Finland. After the summer break, he battled it out with Petter Solberg at Wales Rally GB, finishing second and taking the championship lead. He would then finish fourth in Catalunya, narrowly missing out on clinching the title. The decision had been made to enter Rally Australia for a final round showdown against Benito Guerra, however, following the widespread bushfires in New South Wales, the rally would be cancelled, crowning Loubet as champion with a three-point advantage over Kajetan Kajetanowicz.

== Rally results ==
=== WRC results ===
Year	Entrant	Car	1	2	3	4	5	6	7	8	9	10	11	12	13	14	WDC	Points
2015	Pierre-Louis Loubet	Citroën DS3 R3T Max	MON	SWE	MEX	ARG	POR; 28	ITA	POL; Ret	FIN; Ret	GER	AUS	FRA; Ret	ESP; 32	GBR; 34		NC	0
2016	Pierre-Louis Loubet	Peugeot 207 S2000	MON	SWE	MEX	ARG	POR; Ret										NC	0
2016	Pierre-Louis Loubet	Citroën DS3 R5						ITA; 17	POL; 18	FIN; Ret	GER; 12	CHN; C	FRA; 25	ESP; 13	GBR; 41	AUS	NC	0
2017	Pierre-Louis Loubet	Citroën DS3 R5	MON	SWE; Ret	MEX												NC	0
2017	Pierre-Louis Loubet	Ford Fiesta R5				FRA; 15	ARG	POR; 25	ITA; 19	POL; 21	FIN; 31	GER; 14	ESP; 11	GBR; 20	AUS		NC	0
2018	BRC Racing Team	Hyundai i20 R5	MON	SWE	MEX	FRA; 23	ARG	POR; 11	ITA; Ret	FIN; 15	GER; Ret	TUR	GBR; Ret	ESP; 18	AUS		NC	0
2019	Pierre-Louis Loubet	Škoda Fabia R5	MON	SWE	MEX	FRA; 44	ARG	CHL	POR; 9	ITA; 11	FIN; 14	GER	TUR				21st	2
2019	Pierre-Louis Loubet	Škoda Fabia R5 Evo												GBR; 12	ESP; 17	AUS; C	21st	2
2020	Hyundai 2C Competition	Hyundai i20 Coupe WRC	MON	SWE	MEX	EST; Ret	TUR; Ret	ITA; 7	MNZ								19th	6
2021	Hyundai 2C Competition	Hyundai i20 Coupe WRC	MON; 16	ARC; 39	CRO; 29	POR; Ret	ITA; Ret	KEN; WD	EST; 7	BEL; 68	GRE; Ret	FIN	ESP; WD	MNZ			18th	6
2022	M-Sport Ford WRT	Ford Puma Rally1	MON	SWE	CRO; 47	POR; 7	ITA; 4	KEN	EST; Ret	FIN; Ret	BEL	GRE; 4	NZL	ESP; 10	JPN		13th	31
2023	M-Sport Ford WRT	Ford Puma Rally1	MON; Ret	SWE; 6	MEX; 27	CRO; 7	POR; 32	ITA; Ret	KEN; 7	EST; 6	FIN; 45	GRE; Ret	CHL; Ret	EUR; 10	JPN		12th	29

=== WRC-2 results ===
Year	Entrant	Car	1	2	3	4	5	6	7	8	9	10	11	12	13	14	WDC	Points
2016	Pierre-Louis Loubet	Peugeot 207 S2000	MON	SWE	MEX	ARG	POR; Ret										10th	36
2016	Pierre-Louis Loubet	Citroën DS3 R5						ITA; 6	POL; 6	FIN; Ret	GER; 5	CHN; C	FRA; 5	ESP	GBR	AUS	10th	36
2017	Pierre-Louis Loubet	Citroën DS3 R5	MON	SWE; Ret	MEX												10th	39
2017	Pierre-Louis Loubet	Ford Fiesta R5				FRA; 6	ARG	POR; 10	ITA; 5	POL	FIN; 7	GER; 5	ESP	GBR; 8	AUS		10th	39
2018	Pierre-Louis Loubet	Hyundai i20 R5	MON	SWE	MEX	FRA; 6	ARG	POR; 4	ITA; Ret	FIN; 5	GER; Ret	TUR	GBR; Ret	ESP; 7	AUS		11th	36
2019	Pierre-Louis Loubet	Škoda Fabia R5	MON	SWE	MEX	FRA; 10	ARG	CHL	POR; 1	ITA; 1	FIN; 4	GER	TUR				1st	91
2019	Pierre-Louis Loubet	Škoda Fabia R5 Evo												GBR; 2	ESP; 5	AUS; C	1st	91
