= 2018 Junior WRC Championship =

The 2018 FIA Junior WRC Championship was the sixth season of Junior WRC, a rallying championship governed by the Fédération Internationale de l'Automobile, running in support of the World Rally Championship.

The 2018 championship was open to drivers under the age of 30—although no such restriction existed for co-drivers—and they were competing in identical one-litre Ford Fiesta R2s built and maintained by M-Sport. Crews who contested the Junior WRC were also eligible to score points in the 2018 WRC3 Championship. The championship was competed over five selected WRC rounds with the winning crew awarded a new Ford Fiesta R5 car, tyre package, free fuel and a registration to compete in the 2019 WRC2 Championship.

== Calendar ==
The final 2018 Junior WRC calendar consisted of five events, taken from the 2018 World Rally Championship.

Round	Dates		Rally name	Rally headquarters	Rally details		
Round	Start	Finish	Rally name	Rally headquarters	Surface	Stages	Distance
1	15 February	18 February	Rally Sweden	Torsby, Värmland	Snow	19	314.25 km
2	5 April	8 April	(France) Tour de Corse	Bastia, Haute-Corse	Tarmac	12	333.48 km
3	17 May	20 May	Rally de Portugal	Matosinhos, Porto	Gravel	20	358.19 km
4	26 July	29 July	Rally Finland	Jyväskylä, Keski-Suomi	Gravel	23	317.26 km
5	13 September	16 September	Rally Turkey	Marmaris, Muğla	Gravel	17	312.44 km

=== Calendar changes ===
The championship started in Sweden for the first time since 2006. The Rally of Poland was removed from the calendar after the event was taken off the World Championship schedule, while the Rallies of Deutschland and Rally Catalunya were also removed from the schedule and replaced by the Rally of Turkey. The changes were made to create a more compact championship with an earlier end date whilst giving drivers experience on a wider range of surface types.

== Entries ==
The following crews competed in the championship.

Drivers	Co-drivers	Rounds
(Italy) Umberto Accornero	(Italy) Maurizio Barone	2–4
(Romania) Raul Badiu	(Romania) Gabriel Lazăr	5
(Turkey) Bugra Banaz	(Turkey) Burak Erdener	2–5
(Sweden) Emil Bergkvist	(Norway) Ola Fløene	1–2
(Sweden) Emil Bergkvist	(Sweden) Joakim Sjöberg	3–4
(Sweden) Emil Bergkvist	(Sweden) Patrik Barth	5
(Italy) Luca Bottarelli	(Italy) Manuel Fenoli	1–5
(France) Théo Chalal	(France) Jacques-Julien Renucci	1
(Republic of Ireland) Callum Devine	(Republic of Ireland) Keith Moriarty	1–2
(Republic of Ireland) Callum Devine	(Republic of Ireland) Brian Hoy	3–5
(Chile) Emilio Fernández	(Chile) Joaquin Riquelme	1–5
(France) Terry Folb	(France) Christopher Guieu	1–2
(France) Terry Folb	(France) Kevin Bronner	3–4
(France) Jean-Baptiste Franceschi	(France) Romain Courbon	1–5
(Finland) Henri Hokkala	(Finland) Kimmo Pahkala	4
(New Zealand) David Holder	(New Zealand) Jason Farmer	1–5
(Italy) Enrico Oldrati	(Italy) Danilo Fappani	1–4
(Italy) Enrico Oldrati	(Italy) Elia De Guio	5
(Sweden) Dennis Rådström	(Sweden) Johan Johansson	1–5
(Germany) Julius Tannert	(Austria) Jürgen Heigl	1–5
(Estonia) Ken Torn	(Estonia) Kuldar Sikk	1, 3–5
(Estonia) Ken Torn	(Estonia) Ken Järveoja	2
(United Kingdom) Tom Williams	(United Kingdom) Phil Hall	1–5

== Rule changes ==
The final round of the championship was worth double points to encourage crews to contest all five events of the championship. Pirelli tyres replaced the DMACK tyres.

== Results and standings ==
=== Season summary ===
Round	Event	Winning driver	Winning co-driver	Winning time	Report
1	Rally Sweden	(Sweden) Dennis Rådström	(Sweden) Johan Johansson	3:16:26.0	Report
2	(France) Tour de Corse	(France) Jean-Baptiste Franceschi	(France) Romain Courbon	3:56:28.7	Report
3	Rally de Portugal	(Sweden) Dennis Rådström	(Sweden) Johan Johansson	4:26:51.2	Report
4	Rally Finland	(Estonia) Ken Torn	(Estonia) Kuldar Sikk	3:03:07.2	Report
5	Rally Turkey	(Sweden) Emil Bergkvist	(Sweden) Patrik Barth	4:40:03.2	Report

=== Scoring system ===
Points are awarded to the top ten classified finishers. An additional point is given for every stage win. The best 4 classification results count towards the drivers’ and co-drivers’ totals, but stage points from all 5 rounds can be retained.

Position	1st	2nd	3rd	4th	5th	6th	7th	8th	9th	10th
Points	25	18	15	12	10	8	6	4	2	1

=== FIA Junior WRC Championship for Drivers ===
Pos.	Driver	SWE (Sweden)	FRA (France)	POR (Portugal)	FIN (Finland)	TUR (Turkey)	Drops	Points
1	(Sweden) Emil Bergkvist	2^{+5}	3	5^{+10}	2^{+12}	1	10	128
2	(Sweden) Dennis Rådström	1^{+9}	4	1^{+3}	Ret	2	0	110
3	(France) Jean-Baptiste Franceschi	4	1^{+8}	9	3	Ret^{+7}	0	69
4	(Republic of Ireland) Callum Devine	6	5	Ret	5	4^{+2}	0	54
5	(Estonia) Ken Torn	12^{+4}	6	Ret^{+3}	1^{+9}	Ret^{+3}	0	52
6	(Turkey) Bugra Banaz		8	4	7	5	0	42
7	(Chile) Emilio Fernández	7^{+1}	10	11	13	3	0	38
8	(Germany) Julius Tannert	3	9	10^{+1}	4	Ret^{+2}	0	33
9	(New Zealand) David Holder	9	14	3	9	7^{+2}	0	33
10	(United Kingdom) Tom Williams	10	11	7	6	6	0	31
11	(France) Terry Folb	5	2^{+2}				0	30
12	(Italy) Enrico Oldrati	Ret		2	8	8	0	30
13	(Italy) Luca Bottarelli	8	7^{+1}	6^{+1}			0	20
14	(Italy) Umberto Accornero			8	10		0	5
15	(Finland) Henri Hokkala				Ret^{+2}		0	2
16	(France) Theo Chalal	11					0	0
17	(Romania) Raul Badiu					Ret	0	0
Pos.	Driver	SWE (Sweden)	FRA (France)	POR (Portugal)	FIN (Finland)	TUR (Turkey)	Drops	Points

Key
Colour	Result
Gold	Winner
Silver	2nd place
Bronze	3rd place
Green	Points finish
Blue	Non-points finish
Blue	Non-classified finish (NC)
Purple	Did not finish (Ret)
Black	Excluded (EX)
Black	Disqualified (DSQ)
White	Did not start (DNS)
White	Cancelled (C)
Blank	Withdrew entry from the event (WD)

=== FIA Junior WRC Championship for Co-Drivers ===
Pos.	Co-driver	SWE (Sweden)	FRA (France)	POR (Portugal)	FIN (Finland)	TUR (Turkey)	Drops	Points
1	(Sweden) Johan Johansson	1^{+9}	4	1^{+3}	Ret	2	0	110
2	(France) Romain Courbon	4	1^{+8}	9	3	Ret^{+7}	0	69
3	(Sweden) Joakim Sjöberg			5^{+10}	2^{+12}		0	50
4	(Estonia) Kuldar Sikk	12^{+4}		Ret^{+3}	1^{+9}	Ret^{+3}	0	44
5	(Turkey) Burak Erdener		8	4	7	5	0	42
6	(Norway) Ola Fløene	2^{+5}	3				0	38
7	(Chile) Joaquin Riquelme	7^{+1}	10	11	13	3	0	38
8	(Austria) Jürgen Heigl	3	9	10^{+1}	4	Ret^{+2}	0	33
9	(New Zealand) Jason Farmer	9	14	3	9	7^{+2}	0	33
10	(United Kingdom) Phil Hall	10	11	7	6	6	0	31
11	(France) Christopher Guieu	5	2^{+2}				0	30
12	(Sweden) Patrick Barth					1	0	25
13	(Republic of Ireland) Brian Hoy			Ret	5	4	0	22
14	(Italy) Danilo Fappani	Ret	12	2	8		0	22
15	(Italy) Manuel Fenoli	8	7^{+1}	6^{+1}	11	WD	0	20
16	(Republic of Ireland) Keith Moriarty	6	5				0	18
17	(Estonia) Ken Järveoja		6				0	8
18	(Italy) Maurizio Barone		13	8	10		0	5
19	(Italy) Elia De Guio					8	0	4
20	(Finland) Kimmo Pahkala				Ret^{+2}		0	2
21	(France) Jacques-Julien Renucci	11					0	0
22	(Romania) Gabriel Lazăr					Ret	0	0
Pos.	Co-driver	SWE (Sweden)	FRA (France)	POR (Portugal)	FIN (Finland)	TUR (Turkey)	Drops	Points

Key
Colour	Result
Gold	Winner
Silver	2nd place
Bronze	3rd place
Green	Points finish
Blue	Non-points finish
Blue	Non-classified finish (NC)
Purple	Did not finish (Ret)
Black	Excluded (EX)
Black	Disqualified (DSQ)
White	Did not start (DNS)
White	Cancelled (C)
Blank	Withdrew entry from the event (WD)

=== FIA Junior WRC Championship for Nations ===
Pos.	Country	SWE (Sweden)	FRA (France)	POR (Portugal)	FIN (Finland)	TUR (Turkey)	Points
1	Sweden	1	2	1	2	1	111
2	France	3	1	6	3		63
3	Ireland	4	3		5	3	52
4	Italy	6	5	2	8	7	46
5	Germany	2	7	7	4		42
6	Estonia	9	4		1		39
7	Turkey		6	4	7	4	38
8	Chile	5	8	8	10	2	37
9	United Kingdom	8	9	5	6	5	34
10	New Zealand	7	10	3	9	6	32
11	Romania					~~8~~	0
12	Latvia	DNS					0
13	Finland				11		0
Pos.	Co-driver	SWE (Sweden)	FRA (France)	POR (Portugal)	FIN (Finland)	TUR (Turkey)	Points
