= 2019 Rallye Deutschland =

37th edition of Rallye Deutschland

2019 Rally Deutschland: 37. ADAC Rallye Deutschland
Round 10 of 14 in the 2019 World Rally Championship
← Previous event	Next event →
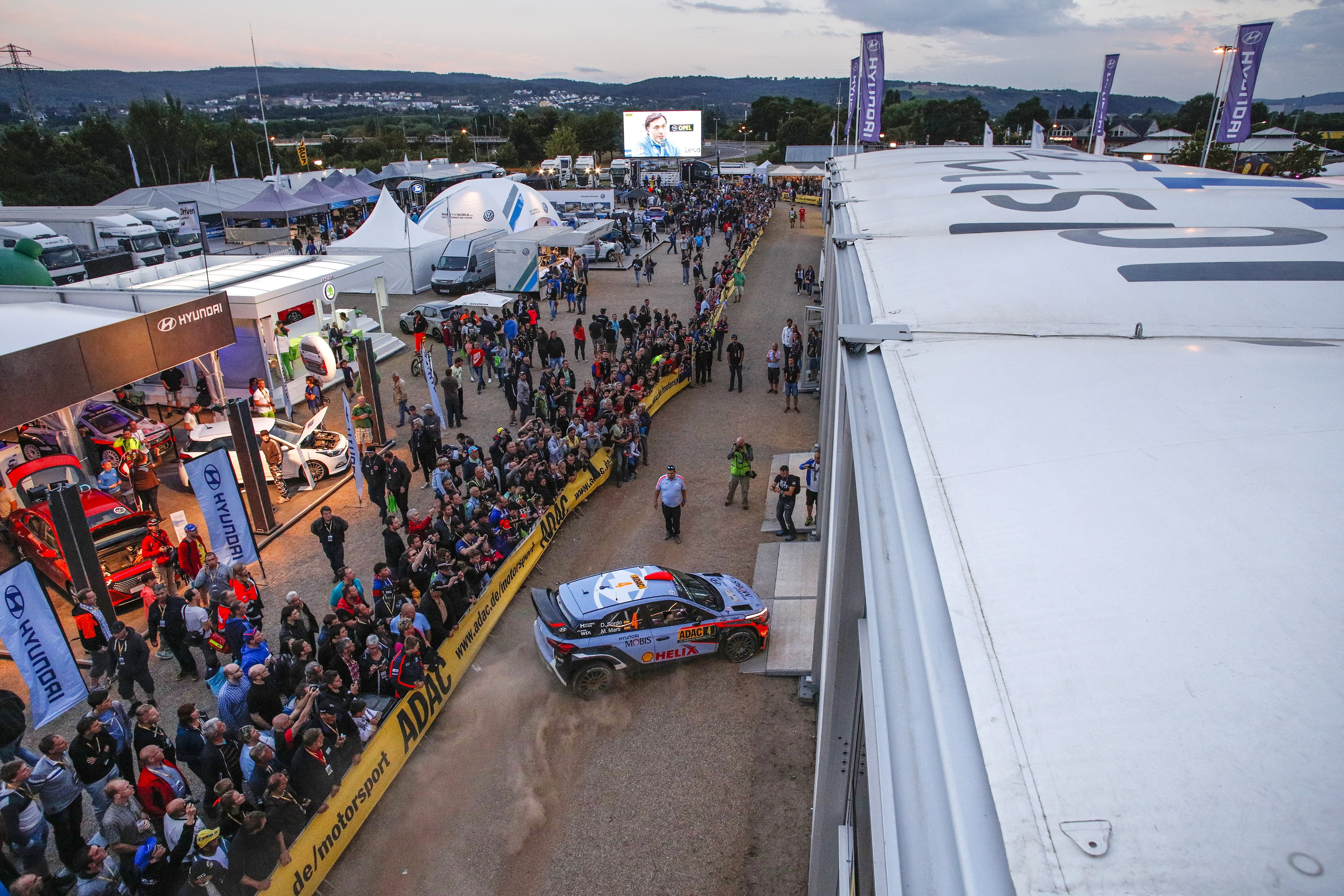
- Unpredictable weather and a variety of tarmac surfaces can make tyre choice difficult.
- Host country: Germany
- Rally base: Bostalsee, Saarland
- Dates run: 22 – 25 August 2019
- Start location: Winterbach, Saarland
- Finish location: Sankt Wendel, Saarland
- Stages: 19 (344.04 km; 213.78 miles)
- Stage surface: Tarmac
- Transport distance: 844.19 km (524.56 miles)
- Overall distance: 1,228.23 km (763.19 miles)

Statistics
- Crews registered: 55
- Crews: 52 at start, 41 at finish

Overall results
- Overall winner: (Estonia) Ott Tänak (Estonia) Martin Järveoja (Japan) Toyota Gazoo Racing WRT; 3:15:29.8
- Power Stage winner: (Belgium) Thierry Neuville (Belgium) Nicolas Gilsoul (South Korea) Hyundai Shell Mobis WRT

Support category results
- WRC-2 winner: (Germany) Fabian Kreim (Germany) Tobias Braun (Germany) Fabian Kreim; 3:28:16.7

The 2019 Rallye Deutschland (also known as ADAC Rallye Deutschland 2019) was a motor racing event for rally cars that was held over four days between 22 and 25 August 2019. It marked the thirty-seventh running of Rallye Deutschland and was the tenth round of the 2019 World Rally Championship, World Rally Championship-2 and the newly created WRC-2 Pro class. The 2019 event was based at the Bostalsee in Saarland, and was contested over nineteen special stages with a total a competitive distance of 344.04 km (213.78 mi).

Ott Tänak and Martin Järveoja were the defending rally winners. Their team, Toyota Gazoo Racing WRT, were the defending manufacturers' winners. The Škoda Motorsport crew of Jan Kopecký and Pavel Dresler were the defending winners in the World Rally Championship-2 category, but they did not defend their titles as they were promoted to the newly created WRC-2 Pro class.

Tänak and Järveoja successfully defended their titles to get German hat-trick. Their team, Toyota Gazoo Racing WRT, won the rally and covered all three podium places for the first time since 1993 Safari Rally. The Škoda Motorsport crew of Jan Kopecký and Pavel Dresler took their first victory of the season in the WRC-2 Pro category, finishing first in the combined WRC-2 category, while the local crew of Fabian Kreim and Tobias Braun won the wider WRC-2 class.

== Background ==
=== Championship standings prior to the event ===
Ott Tänak and Martin Järveoja led both the drivers' and co-drivers' championships with a twenty-two-point ahead of defending world champions Sébastien Ogier and Julien Ingrassia. Thierry Neuville and Nicolas Gilsoul were third, a further three points behind. In the World Rally Championship for Manufacturers, Hyundai Shell Mobis WRT held a twenty-four-point lead over Toyota Gazoo Racing WRT.

In the World Rally Championship-2 Pro standings, Kalle Rovanperä and Jonne Halttunen held a thirty-eight-point lead ahead of Mads Østberg and Torstein Eriksen in the drivers' and co-drivers' standings respectively. Gus Greensmith and Elliott Edmondson were third, another thirteen points further back. In the manufacturers' championship, Škoda Motorsport led M-Sport Ford WRT by three points, with Citroën Total sixty-one points behind in third.

In the World Rally Championship-2 standings, Benito Guerra and Jaime Zapata led the drivers' and co-drivers' standings by eighteen points respectively. Pierre-Louis Loubet and Vincent Landais crew and Nikolay Gryazin and Yaroslav Fedorov crew tied in second.

=== Entry list ===
The following crews entered into the rally. The event opened to crews competing in the World Rally Championship, World Rally Championship-2, WRC-2 Pro and privateer entries not registered to score points in any championship. A total of fifty-five entries were received, with eleven crews entered with World Rally Cars and nineteen entered the World Rally Championship-2. Four crews were nominated to score points in the Pro class.

No.	Driver	Co-Driver	Entrant	Car	Tyre
World Rally Car entries
1	(France) Sébastien Ogier	(France) Julien Ingrassia	(France) Citroën Total WRT	Citroën C3 WRC	MI
3	(Finland) Teemu Suninen	(Finland) Jarmo Lehtinen	(United Kingdom) M-Sport Ford WRT	Ford Fiesta WRC	MI
4	(Finland) Esapekka Lappi	(Finland) Janne Ferm	(France) Citroën Total WRT	Citroën C3 WRC	MI
5	(United Kingdom) Kris Meeke	(United Kingdom) Sebastian Marshall	(Japan) Toyota Gazoo Racing WRT	Toyota Yaris WRC	MI
6	(Spain) Dani Sordo	(Spain) Carlos del Barrio	(South Korea) Hyundai Shell Mobis WRT	Hyundai i20 Coupe WRC	MI
8	(Estonia) Ott Tänak	(Estonia) Martin Järveoja	(Japan) Toyota Gazoo Racing WRT	Toyota Yaris WRC	MI
10	(Finland) Jari-Matti Latvala	(Finland) Miikka Anttila	(Japan) Toyota Gazoo Racing WRT	Toyota Yaris WRC	MI
11	(Belgium) Thierry Neuville	(Belgium) Nicolas Gilsoul	(South Korea) Hyundai Shell Mobis WRT	Hyundai i20 Coupe WRC	MI
17	(Japan) Takamoto Katsuta	(United Kingdom) Daniel Barritt	(Finland) Tommi Mäkinen Racing	Toyota Yaris WRC	MI
44	(United Kingdom) Gus Greensmith	(United Kingdom) Elliott Edmondson	(United Kingdom) M-Sport Ford WRT	Ford Fiesta WRC	MI
89	(Norway) Andreas Mikkelsen	(Norway) Anders Jæger-Amland	(South Korea) Hyundai Shell Mobis WRT	Hyundai i20 Coupe WRC	MI
World Rally Championship-2 Pro entries
21	(Finland) Kalle Rovanperä	(Finland) Jonne Halttunen	(Czech Republic) Škoda Motorsport	Škoda Fabia R5 Evo	MI
22	(Norway) Mads Østberg	(Norway) Torstein Eriksen	(France) Citroën Total (Note: Entry run in conjunction with DG Sport.)	Citroën C3 R5	MI
23	(Czech Republic) Jan Kopecký	(Czech Republic) Pavel Dresler	(Czech Republic) Škoda Motorsport	Škoda Fabia R5 Evo	MI
24	(France) Eric Camilli	(France) Benjamin Veillas	(United Kingdom) M-Sport Ford WRT	Ford Fiesta R5 Mk. II	MI
World Rally Championship-2 entries
41	(Russia) Nikolay Gryazin	(Russia) Yaroslav Fedorov	(Russia) Nikolay Gryazin (Note: Entry operated by Sports Racing Technologies.)	Škoda Fabia R5	MI
43	(Poland) Kajetan Kajetanowicz	(Poland) Maciej Szczepaniak	(Poland) Kajetan Kajetanowicz (Note: Entry operated by Lotos Dynamic Rally Team.)	Volkswagen Polo GTI R5	P
45	(Italy) Fabio Andolfi	(Italy) Simone Scattolin	(Italy) Fabio Andolfi (Note: Entry operated by ACI Team Italia WRC.)	Škoda Fabia R5	P
46	(United Kingdom) Rhys Yates	(United Kingdom) James Morgan	(United Kingdom) Rhys Yates	Škoda Fabia R5	P
47	(France) Adrien Fourmaux	(Belgium) Renaud Jamoul	(France) Adrien Fourmaux (Note: Entry operated by Equipe du France FFSA.)	Ford Fiesta R5 Mk. II	MI
48	(Romania) Simone Tempestini	(Romania) Sergiu Itu	(Romania) Simone Tempestini (Note: Entry operated by Friulmotor Rally Team.)	Hyundai i20 R5	P
49	(Belgium) Guillaume De Mevius	(Belgium) Martijn Wydaeghe	(Belgium) Guillaume De Mevius (Note: Entry operated by DG Sport.)	Citroën C3 R5	MI
50	(France) Nicolas Ciamin	(France) Yannick Roche	(France) Nicolas Ciamin (Note: Entry supported by Oreca.)	Volkswagen Polo GTI R5	MI
51	(Belgium) Sébastien Bedoret	(Belgium) Thomas Walbrecq	(Belgium) Sébastien Bedoret	Škoda Fabia R5	MI
52	(Italy) "Pedro" (Note: Pseudonym of Massimo Pedretti.)	(Italy) Emanuele Baldaccini	(Italy) "Pedro"	Ford Fiesta R5 Mk. II	P
53	(France) Stéphane Lefebvre	(France) Thomas Dubois	(France) Stéphane Lefebvre	Volkswagen Polo GTI R5	P
54	(Germany) Marijan Griebel	(Germany) Pirmin Winklhofer	(Germany) Marijan Griebel	Škoda Fabia R5 Evo	MI
55	(Germany) Fabian Kreim	(Germany) Tobias Braun	(Germany) Fabian Kreim (Note: Entry operated by Škoda Auto Deutschland.)	Škoda Fabia R5 Evo	P
56	(Germany) Dominik Dinkel	(Germany) Christina Fürst	(Germany) Dominik Dinkel (Note: Entry operated by Brose Motorsport.)	Hyundai i20 R5	P
57	(Germany) Sebastian Schwinn	(Germany) Felix Griebel	(Germany) Sebastian Schwinn	Volkswagen Polo GTI R5	MI
Other Major Entries
72	(Belgium) Kris Princen	(Belgium) Peter Kaspers	(Belgium) Kris Princen	Citroën DS3 WRC	MI
73	(France) Stéphane Sarrazin	(France) Jacques-Julien Renucci	(France) Stéphane Sarrazin	Hyundai i20 R5	P

=== Route ===
The competitive distance was increased from the 2018 event, while the liaison sections were shortened. The second leg features with a new format, with a pair of stages run twice in the morning and another pair run twice in the afternoon. This differs from the traditional format where all stages are run once before the second pass in the afternoon.

==== Itinerary ====
All dates and times are CEST (UTC+2).

Date	Time	No.	Stage name	Distance
22 August	09:00	—	St. Wendeler Land [Shakedown]	5.20 km
Leg 1 — 106.62 km
22 August	19:08	SS1	St. Wendeler Land	5.20 km
23 August	10:14	SS2	Stein und Wein 1	19.44 km
23 August	11:08	SS3	Mittelmosel 1	22.00 km
23 August	12:43	SS4	Wadern — Weiskirchen 1	9.27 km
23 August	15:42	SS5	Stein und Wein 2	19.44 km
23 August	16:36	SS6	Mittelmosel 2	22.00 km
23 August	18:11	SS7	Wadern — Weiskirchen 2	9.27 km
Leg 2 — 157.92 km
24 August	8:09	SS8	Freisen 1	14.78 km
24 August	9:12	SS9	Römerstraße 1	12.28 km
24 August	11:09	SS10	Freisen 2	14.78 km
24 August	12:12	SS11	Römerstraße 2	12.28 km
24 August	15:08	SS12	Arena Panzerplatte 1	10.73 km
24 August	15:46	SS13	Panzerplatte 1	41.17 km
24 August	18:53	SS14	Arena Panzerplatte 2	10.73 km
24 August	19:31	SS15	Panzerplatte 2	41.17 km
Leg 3 — 79.50 km
25 August	7:46	SS16	Grafschaft 1	28.06 km
25 August	9:41	SS17	Dhrontal 1	11.69 km
25 August	10:10	SS18	Grafschaft 2	28.06 km
25 August	13:18	SS19	Dhrontal 2 [Power Stage]	11.69 km

== Report ==
=== World Rally Cars ===
The M-Sport Ford WRT crew of Elfyn Evans and Scott Martin were expected to return, having been forced to miss Rally Finland when Evans was injured in a pre-event testing crash. However, Evans' recovery time was subsequently extended, forcing him to miss Rallye Deutschland as well.

Ott Tänak held a narrow lead ahead of title rival Thierry Neuville going to the second leg. Teemu Suninen retired from Friday with mechanical problems. In Saturday afternoon, Tänak's two title rivals Neuville and Sébastien Ogier both suffered a puncture, which gave Toyota a dramatic 1-2-3. Eventually, three Toyotas came back safely to complete the first 1-2-3 finish in WRC since 2015 Rallye Deutschland.

==== Classification ====
Position		No.	Driver	Co-driver	Entrant	Car	Time	Difference	Points	
Event	Class	No.	Driver	Co-driver	Entrant	Car	Time	Difference	Event	Stage
1	1	8	Ott Tänak	Martin Järveoja	Toyota Gazoo Racing WRT	Toyota Yaris WRC	3:15:29.8	0.0	25	0
2	2	5	Kris Meeke	Sebastian Marshall	Toyota Gazoo Racing WRT	Toyota Yaris WRC	3:15:50.6	+20.8	18	2
3	3	10	Jari-Matti Latvala	Miikka Anttila	Toyota Gazoo Racing WRT	Toyota Yaris WRC	3:16:05.8	+36.0	15	3
4	4	11	Thierry Neuville	Nicolas Gilsoul	Hyundai Shell Mobis WRT	Hyundai i20 Coupe WRC	3:16:28.3	+58.5	12	5
5	5	6	Dani Sordo	Carlos del Barrio	Hyundai Shell Mobis WRT	Hyundai i20 Coupe WRC	3:16:46.4	+1:16.6	10	0
6	6	89	Andreas Mikkelsen	Anders Jæger-Amland	Hyundai Shell Mobis WRT	Hyundai i20 Coupe WRC	3:17:16.0	+1:46.2	8	0
7	7	1	Sébastien Ogier	Julien Ingrassia	Citroën Total WRT	Citroën C3 WRC	3:17:26.1	+1:56.3	6	1
8	8	4	Esapekka Lappi	Janne Ferm	Citroën Total WRT	Citroën C3 WRC	3:17:32.0	+2:02.2	4	0
9	9	33	Gus Greensmith	Elliott Edmondson	M-Sport Ford WRT	Ford Fiesta WRC	3:21:52.0	+6:22.2	2	0
10	10	17	Takamoto Katsuta	Daniel Barritt	Tommi Mäkinen Racing	Toyota Yaris WRC	3:23:49.0	+8:19.2	1	0
29	11	3	Teemu Suninen	Marko Salminen	M-Sport Ford WRT	Ford Fiesta WRC	3:57:24.0	+41:54.2	0	4

==== Special stages ====
Date	No.	Stage name	Distance	Winners	Car	Time	Class leaders
22 August	—	St. Wendeler Land [Shakedown]	5.20 km	Ogier / Ingrassia	Citroën C3 WRC	2:39.7	—N/a
22 August	SS1	St. Wendeler Land	5.20 km	Tänak / Järveoja	Toyota Yaris WRC	2:39.4	Tänak / Järveoja
23 August	SS2	Stein und Wein 1	19.44 km	Neuville / Gilsoul	Hyundai i20 Coupe WRC	10:40.4	Neuville / Gilsoul
23 August	SS3	Mittelmosel 1	22.00 km	Tänak / Järveoja	Toyota Yaris WRC	12:26.4	Tänak / Järveoja
23 August	SS4	Wadern — Weiskirchen 1	9.27 km	Tänak / Järveoja	Toyota Yaris WRC	5:03.6	Tänak / Järveoja
23 August	SS5	Stein und Wein 2	19.44 km	Neuville / Gilsoul	Hyundai i20 Coupe WRC	10:46.0	Tänak / Järveoja
23 August	SS6	Mittelmosel 2	22.00 km	Tänak / Järveoja	Toyota Yaris WRC	12:28.0	Tänak / Järveoja
23 August	SS7	Wadern — Weiskirchen 2	9.27 km	Tänak / Järveoja	Toyota Yaris WRC	5:05.3	Tänak / Järveoja
24 August	SS8	Freisen 1	14.78 km	Sordo / del Barrio	Hyundai i20 Coupe WRC	8:28.0	Tänak / Järveoja
24 August	SS9	Römerstraße 1	12.28 km	Tänak / Järveoja	Toyota Yaris WRC	5:57.4	Tänak / Järveoja
24 August	SS10	Freisen 2	14.78 km	Neuville / Gilsoul	Hyundai i20 Coupe WRC	8:31.7	Tänak / Järveoja
24 August	SS11	Römerstraße 2	12.28 km	Neuville / Gilsoul	Hyundai i20 Coupe WRC	5:59.9	Tänak / Järveoja
24 August	SS12	Arena Panzerplatte 1	10.73 km	Tänak / Järveoja	Toyota Yaris WRC	6:05.8	Tänak / Järveoja
24 August	SS13	Panzerplatte 1	41.17 km	Tänak / Järveoja	Toyota Yaris WRC	23:27.2	Tänak / Järveoja
24 August	SS14	Arena Panzerplatte 2	10.73 km	Latvala / Anttila	Toyota Yaris WRC	6:04.3	Tänak / Järveoja
24 August	SS15	Panzerplatte 2	41.17 km	Meeke / Marshall	Toyota Yaris WRC	23:17.6	Tänak / Järveoja
25 August	SS16	Grafschaft 1	28.06 km	Neuville / Gilsoul	Hyundai i20 Coupe WRC	16:16.2	Tänak / Järveoja
25 August	SS17	Dhrontal 1	11.69 km	Latvala / Anttila	Toyota Yaris WRC	7:35.1	Tänak / Järveoja
25 August	SS18	Grafschaft 2	28.06 km	Neuville / Gilsoul	Hyundai i20 Coupe WRC	16:08.8	Tänak / Järveoja
25 August	SS19	Dhrontal 2 [Power Stage]	11.69 km	Neuville / Gilsoul	Hyundai i20 Coupe WRC	7:30.2	Tänak / Järveoja

==== Championship standings ====
Pos.	Drivers' championships			Co-drivers' championships			Manufacturers' championships		
Pos.	Move	Driver	Points	Move	Co-driver	Points	Move	Manufacturer	Points
1		Ott Tänak	205		Martin Järveoja	205		Hyundai Shell Mobis WRT	289
2	1	Thierry Neuville	172	1	Nicolas Gilsoul	172		Toyota Gazoo Racing WRT	281
3	1	Sébastien Ogier	165	1	Julien Ingrassia	165		Citroën Total WRT	216
4	3	Kris Meeke	80	2	Sebastian Marshall	80		M-Sport Ford WRT	168
5		Andreas Mikkelsen	79		Anders Jæger-Amland	79			

=== World Rally Championship-2 Pro ===
Kalle Rovanperä led the category with a 20-second margin going into Saturday, but the young Finn had a nightmare morning on Saturday, when he slid into the ditch twice. Kalle's mistakes handed his lead to his teammate Jan Kopecký. Eventually, he won his first Pro victory.

==== Classification ====
Position		No.	Driver	Co-driver	Entrant	Car	Time	Difference	Points	
Event	Class	No.	Driver	Co-driver	Entrant	Car	Time	Difference	Class	Event
11	1	23	Jan Kopecký	Pavel Dresler	Škoda Motorsport	Škoda Fabia R5 Evo	3:27:24.1	0.0	**25**	**0**
15	2	24	Eric Camilli	Benjamin Veillas	M-Sport Ford WRT	Ford Fiesta R5 Mk. II	3:28:43.2	+1:19.1	**18**	**0**
16	3	21	Kalle Rovanperä	Jonne Halttunen	Škoda Motorsport	Škoda Fabia R5 Evo	3:30:18.1	+2:54.0	**15**	**0**
17	4	22	Mads Østberg	Torstein Eriksen	Citroën Total	Citroën C3 R5	3:31:00.6	+3:36.5	**12**	**0**

==== Special stages ====
Results in bold denote first in the RC2 class, the class which both the WRC-2 Pro and WRC-2 championships run to.

Date	No.	Stage name	Distance	Winners	Car	Time	Class leaders
22 August	—	St. Wendeler Land [Shakedown]	5.20 km	**Rovanperä / Halttunen**	Škoda Fabia R5 Evo	2:49.2	—N/a
22 August	SS1	St. Wendeler Land	5.20 km	**Rovanperä / Halttunen**	Škoda Fabia R5 Evo	2:48.6	Rovanperä / Halttunen
23 August	SS2	Stein und Wein 1	19.44 km	**Rovanperä / Halttunen**	Škoda Fabia R5 Evo	11:14.3	Rovanperä / Halttunen
23 August	SS3	Mittelmosel 1	22.00 km	**Rovanperä / Halttunen**	Škoda Fabia R5 Evo	13:04.0	Rovanperä / Halttunen
23 August	SS4	Wadern — Weiskirchen 1	9.27 km	**Kopecký / Dresler**	Škoda Fabia R5 Evo	5:23.7	Rovanperä / Halttunen
23 August	SS5	Stein und Wein 2	19.44 km	**Rovanperä / Halttunen**	Škoda Fabia R5 Evo	11:15.7	Rovanperä / Halttunen
23 August	SS6	Mittelmosel 2	22.00 km	**Rovanperä / Halttunen**	Škoda Fabia R5 Evo	13:00.0	Rovanperä / Halttunen
23 August	SS7	Wadern — Weiskirchen 2	9.27 km	Kopecký / Dresler	Škoda Fabia R5 Evo	5:23.5	Rovanperä / Halttunen
24 August	SS8	Freisen 1	14.78 km	Kopecký / Dresler	Škoda Fabia R5 Evo	9:06.2	Kopecký / Dresler
24 August	SS9	Römerstraße 1	12.28 km	Kopecký / Dresler	Škoda Fabia R5 Evo	6:24.3	Kopecký / Dresler
24 August	SS10	Freisen 2	14.78 km	Camilli / Veillas	Ford Fiesta R5 Mk. II	9:00.5	Kopecký / Dresler
24 August	SS11	Römerstraße 2	12.28 km	**Kopecký / Dresler**	Škoda Fabia R5 Evo	6:25.1	Kopecký / Dresler
24 August	SS12	Arena Panzerplatte 1	10.73 km	**Kopecký / Dresler**	Škoda Fabia R5 Evo	6:28.7	Kopecký / Dresler
24 August	SS13	Panzerplatte 1	41.17 km	**Camilli / Veillas**	Ford Fiesta R5 Mk. II	24:45.4	Kopecký / Dresler
24 August	SS14	Arena Panzerplatte 2	10.73 km	**Rovanperä / Halttunen**	Škoda Fabia R5 Evo	6:26.1	Kopecký / Dresler
24 August	SS15	Panzerplatte 2	41.17 km	**Rovanperä / Halttunen**	Škoda Fabia R5 Evo	24:34.6	Kopecký / Dresler
25 August	SS16	Grafschaft 1	28.06 km	**Rovanperä / Halttunen**	Škoda Fabia R5 Evo	17:14.2	Kopecký / Dresler
25 August	SS17	Dhrontal 1	11.69 km	**Østberg / Eriksen**	Citroën C3 R5	7:55.8	Kopecký / Dresler
25 August	SS18	Grafschaft 2	28.06 km	Rovanperä / Halttunen	Škoda Fabia R5 Evo	17:07.2	Kopecký / Dresler
25 August	SS19	Dhrontal 2	11.69 km	Østberg / Eriksen	Citroën C3 R5	7:56.4	Kopecký / Dresler

==== Championship standings ====
Pos.	Drivers' championships			Co-drivers' championships			Manufacturers' championships		
Pos.	Move	Driver	Points	Move	Co-driver	Points	Move	Manufacturer	Points
1		Kalle Rovanperä	151		Jonne Halttunen	151		Škoda Motorsport	224
2		Mads Østberg	110		Torstein Eriksen	110		M-Sport Ford WRT	195
3		Gus Greensmith	85		Elliott Edmondson	85		Citroën Total	110
4		Łukasz Pieniążek	74		Kamil Heller	62			
5		Jan Kopecký	61		Pavel Dresler	61			

=== World Rally Championship-2 ===
Stéphane Lefebvre held off fellow Frenchman Nicolas Ciamin until he crashed out his Polo during SS9. Unfortunately, Ciamin also crashed out in the following stage, which inherited the lead to local driver Fabian Kreim and handed him a fantastic home win.

==== Classification ====
Position		No.	Driver	Co-driver	Entrant	Car	Time	Difference	Points	
Event	Class	No.	Driver	Co-driver	Entrant	Car	Time	Difference	Class	Event
12	1	55	Fabian Kreim	Tobias Braun	Fabian Kreim	Škoda Fabia R5 Evo	3:28:16.7	0.0	25	0
13	2	54	Marijan Griebel	Pirmin Winklhofer	Marijan Griebel	Škoda Fabia R5 Evo	3:28:35.2	+18.5	18	0
14	3	43	Kajetan Kajetanowicz	Maciej Szczepaniak	Kajetan Kajetanowicz	Volkswagen Polo GTI R5	3:28:38.2	+21.5	15	0
19	4	48	Simone Tempestini	Sergiu Itu	Simone Tempestini	Hyundai i20 R5	3:33:03.9	+4:47.2	12	0
20	5	41	Nikolay Gryazin	Yaroslav Fedorov	Nikolay Gryazin	Škoda Fabia R5	3:33:11.4	+4:54.7	10	0
21	6	56	Dominik Dinkel	Christina Fürst	Dominik Dinkel	Hyundai i20 R5	3:34:12.0	+5:55.3	8	0
21	7	46	Rhys Yates	James Morgan	Rhys Yates	Škoda Fabia R5	3:34:14.2	+5:57.5	6	0
23	8	47	Adrien Fourmaux	Renaud Jamoul	Adrien Fourmaux	Ford Fiesta R5 Mk. II	3:36:15.6	+7:58.9	4	0
26	9	52	"Pedro"	Emanuele Baldaccini	"Pedro"	Ford Fiesta R5 Mk. II	3:48:14.6	+19:57.9	2	0
35	10	49	Guillaume De Mevius	Martijn Wydaeghe	Guillaume De Mevius	Citroën C3 R5	4:12:44.7	+44:28.0	1	0
Retired SS18		45	Fabio Andolfi	Simone Scattolin	Fabio Andolfi	Škoda Fabia R5	Accident		0	0
Retired SS15		51	Sébastien Bedoret	Thomas Walbrecq	Sébastien Bedoret	Škoda Fabia R5	Accident		0	0
Retired SS12		50	Nicolas Ciamin	Yannick Roche	Nicolas Ciamin	Volkswagen Polo GTI R5	Accident		0	0
Retired SS12		53	Stéphane Lefebvre	Thomas Dubois	Stéphane Lefebvre	Volkswagen Polo GTI R5	Accident		0	0
Retired SS8		57	Sebastian Schwinn	Felix Griebel	Sebastian Schwinn	Volkswagen Polo GTI R5	Mechanical		0	0

==== Special stages ====
Results in bold denote first in the RC2 class, the class which both the WRC-2 Pro and WRC-2 championships run to.

Date	No.	Stage name	Distance	Winners	Car	Time	Class leaders
22 August	—	St. Wendeler Land [Shakedown]	5.20 km	Kajetanowicz / Szczepaniak; Lefebvre / Dubois	Volkswagen Polo GTI R5; Volkswagen Polo GTI R5	2:51.9	—N/a
22 August	SS1	St. Wendeler Land	5.20 km	Kreim / Braun	Škoda Fabia R5 Evo	2:50.2	Kreim / Braun
23 August	SS2	Stein und Wein 1	19.44 km	Lefebvre / Dubois	Volkswagen Polo GTI R5	11:20.2	Lefebvre / Dubois
23 August	SS3	Mittelmosel 1	22.00 km	Lefebvre / Dubois	Volkswagen Polo GTI R5	13:07.0	Lefebvre / Dubois
23 August	SS4	Wadern — Weiskirchen 1	9.27 km	Ciamin / Roche	Volkswagen Polo GTI R5	5:24.7	Lefebvre / Dubois
23 August	SS5	Stein und Wein 2	19.44 km	Ciamin / Roche	Volkswagen Polo GTI R5	11:17.9	Lefebvre / Dubois
23 August	SS6	Mittelmosel 2	22.00 km	Ciamin / Roche	Volkswagen Polo GTI R5	13:04.0	Lefebvre / Dubois
23 August	SS7	Wadern — Weiskirchen 2	9.27 km	**Ciamin / Roche**	Volkswagen Polo GTI R5	5:21.9	Lefebvre / Dubois
24 August	SS8	Freisen 1	14.78 km	**Ciamin / Roche**	Volkswagen Polo GTI R5	8:58.3	Lefebvre / Dubois
24 August	SS9	Römerstraße 1	12.28 km	**Ciamin / Roche**	Volkswagen Polo GTI R5	6:23.4	Lefebvre / Dubois
24 August	SS10	Freisen 2	14.78 km	**Ciamin / Roche**	Volkswagen Polo GTI R5	8:59.9	Ciamin / Roche
24 August	SS11	Römerstraße 2	12.28 km	Kreim / Braun	Škoda Fabia R5 Evo	6:26.1	Kreim / Braun
24 August	SS12	Arena Panzerplatte 1	10.73 km	Kreim / Braun	Škoda Fabia R5 Evo	6:32.5	Kreim / Braun
24 August	SS13	Panzerplatte 1	41.17 km	Griebel / Winklhofer	Škoda Fabia R5 Evo	25:09.3	Kreim / Braun
24 August	SS14	Arena Panzerplatte 2	10.73 km	Andolfi / Scattolin	Škoda Fabia R5	6:26.4	Kreim / Braun
24 August	SS15	Panzerplatte 2	41.17 km	Griebel / Winklhofer	Škoda Fabia R5 Evo	24:59.3	Kreim / Braun
25 August	SS16	Grafschaft 1	28.06 km	Kreim / Braun	Škoda Fabia R5 Evo	17:16.7	Kreim / Braun
25 August	SS17	Dhrontal 1	11.69 km	Kreim / Braun	Škoda Fabia R5 Evo	7:59.7	Kreim / Braun
25 August	SS18	Grafschaft 2	28.06 km	**Kajetanowicz / Szczepaniak**	Volkswagen Polo GTI R5	17:06.8	Kreim / Braun
25 August	SS19	Dhrontal 2	11.69 km	**Griebel / Winklhofer**	Škoda Fabia R5 Evo	7:53.0	Kreim / Braun

==== Championship standings ====
Pos.	Drivers' championships			Co-drivers' championships		
Pos.	Move	Driver	Points	Move	Co-driver	Points
1	2	Nikolay Gryazin	73	2	Yaroslav Fedorov	73
2	1	Benito Guerra	69	1	Jaime Zapata	69
3	1	Pierre-Louis Loubet	63	1	Vincent Landais	63
4		Ole Christian Veiby	50		Jonas Andersson	50
5	1	Kajetan Kajetanowicz	48	1	Maciej Szczepaniak	48

== Notes ==
Previous rally: 2019 Rally Finland	2019 FIA World Rally Championship	Next rally: 2019 Rally Turkey
Previous rally: 2018 Rallye Deutschland	2019 Rally Deutschland	Next rally: TBA; 2020 edition cancelled
