= 2019 Rally Turkey =

12th edition of Rally Turkey

2019 Rally Turkey: 12. Marmaris Rally Turkey
Round 11 of 14 in the 2019 World Rally Championship
← Previous event	Next event →
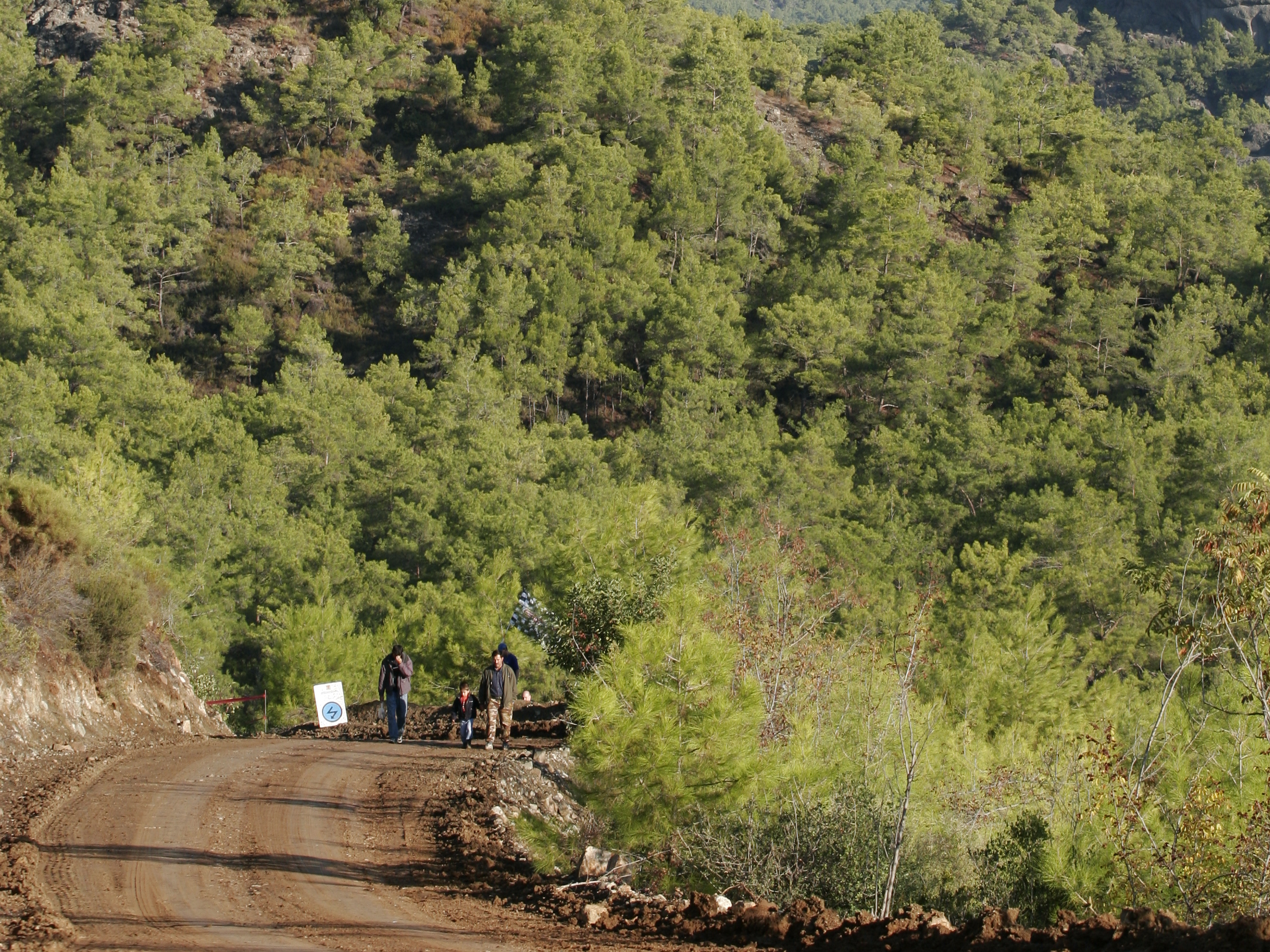
- Rally Turkey is the slowest gravel round on the calendar.
- Host country: Turkey
- Rally base: Marmaris, Muğla
- Dates run: 12 – 15 September 2019
- Start location: Marmaris Castle, Muğla
- Finish location: Marmaris, Muğla
- Stages: 17 (310.10 km; 192.69 miles)
- Stage surface: Gravel
- Transport distance: 678.40 km (421.54 miles)
- Overall distance: 988.50 km (614.23 miles)

Statistics
- Crews registered: 31
- Crews: 28 at start, 24 at finish

Overall results
- Overall winner: (France) Sébastien Ogier (France) Julien Ingrassia (France) Citroën Total WRT; 3:50:12.1
- Power Stage winner: (Estonia) Ott Tänak (Estonia) Martin Järveoja (Japan) Toyota Gazoo Racing WRT

Support category results
- WRC-2 winner: (Poland) Kajetan Kajetanowicz (Poland) Maciej Szczepaniak (Poland) Kajetan Kajetanowicz; 4:06:00.4

The 2019 Rally Turkey (also known as Marmaris Rally Turkey 2019) is a motor racing event for rally cars that was held over four days between 12 and 15 September 2019. It marked the twelfth running of Rally Turkey and was the eleventh round of the 2019 World Rally Championship, World Rally Championship-2 and the newly created WRC-2 Pro class. The 2019 event was based in Marmaris in Muğla Province, and was contested over seventeen special stages with a total a competitive distance of 310.10 km (192.69 mi).

Ott Tänak and Martin Järveoja were the defending rally winners. Their team, Toyota Gazoo Racing WRT, were the defending manufacturers' winners. The Škoda Motorsport crew of Jan Kopecký and Pavel Dresler were the defending winners in the World Rally Championship-2 category, but they did not defend their titles as they were promoted to the newly created WRC-2 Pro class.

Reigning World Drivers' and World Co-Drivers Champions Sébastien Ogier and Julien Ingrassia won in Turkey for the first time in their careers. Their team, Citroën World Rally Team, were the manufacturers' winners. The M-Sport Ford WRT crew of Gus Greensmith and Elliott Edmondson won the WRC-2 Pro category, while the Polish crew of Kajetan Kajetanowicz and Maciej Szczepaniak won the wider WRC-2 class to take the championship lead, finishing third in the combined WRC-2 category.

== Background ==
=== Championship standings prior to the event ===
Ott Tänak and Martin Järveoja led both the drivers' and co-drivers' championships by thirty-three-points ahead of Thierry Neuville and Nicolas Gilsoul. Defending world champions Sébastien Ogier and Julien Ingrassia were third, a further seven points behind. In the World Rally Championship for Manufacturers, Hyundai Shell Mobis WRT held an eight-point lead over Toyota Gazoo Racing WRT.

In the World Rally Championship-2 Pro standings, Kalle Rovanperä and Jonne Halttunen were forty-one points ahead of Mads Østberg and Torstein Eriksen in the drivers' and co-drivers' standings respectively. Gus Greensmith and Elliott Edmondson were third, another twenty-five points further back. In the manufacturers' championship, Škoda Motorsport led M-Sport Ford WRT by twenty-nine points, with Citroën Total eighty-five points behind in third.

In the World Rally Championship-2 standings, Nikolay Gryazin and Yaroslav Fedorov led the drivers' and co-drivers' standings by four points respectively. Benito Guerra and Jaime Zapata were second, while Pierre-Louis Loubet and Vincent Landais were third, six points separating them.

=== Entry list ===
The following crews entered into the rally. The event opened to crews competing in the World Rally Championship, World Rally Championship-2, WRC-2 Pro and privateer entries not registered to score points in any championship. A total of thirty-one entries were received, with ten crews entered with World Rally Cars and sixteen entered the World Rally Championship-2. Three crews were nominated to score points in the Pro class.

No.	Driver	Co-Driver	Entrant	Car	Tyre
World Rally Car entries
1	(France) Sébastien Ogier	(France) Julien Ingrassia	(France) Citroën Total WRT	Citroën C3 WRC	M
3	(Finland) Teemu Suninen	(Finland) Jarmo Lehtinen	(United Kingdom) M-Sport Ford WRT	Ford Fiesta WRC	M
4	(Finland) Esapekka Lappi	(Finland) Janne Ferm	(France) Citroën Total WRT	Citroën C3 WRC	M
5	(United Kingdom) Kris Meeke	(United Kingdom) Sebastian Marshall	(Japan) Toyota Gazoo Racing WRT	Toyota Yaris WRC	M
6	(Spain) Dani Sordo	(Spain) Carlos del Barrio	(South Korea) Hyundai Shell Mobis WRT	Hyundai i20 Coupe WRC	M
7	(Sweden) Pontus Tidemand	(Norway) Ola Fløene	(United Kingdom) M-Sport Ford WRT	Ford Fiesta WRC	M
8	(Estonia) Ott Tänak	(Estonia) Martin Järveoja	(Japan) Toyota Gazoo Racing WRT	Toyota Yaris WRC	M
10	(Finland) Jari-Matti Latvala	(Finland) Miikka Anttila	(Japan) Toyota Gazoo Racing WRT	Toyota Yaris WRC	M
11	(Belgium) Thierry Neuville	(Belgium) Nicolas Gilsoul	(South Korea) Hyundai Shell Mobis WRT	Hyundai i20 Coupe WRC	M
89	(Norway) Andreas Mikkelsen	(Norway) Anders Jæger-Amland	(South Korea) Hyundai Shell Mobis WRT	Hyundai i20 Coupe WRC	M
World Rally Championship-2 Pro entries
21	(Finland) Kalle Rovanperä	(Finland) Jonne Halttunen	(Czech Republic) Škoda Motorsport	Škoda Fabia R5 Evo	M
22	(United Kingdom) Gus Greensmith	(United Kingdom) Elliott Edmondson	(United Kingdom) M-Sport Ford WRT	Ford Fiesta R5 Mk. II	M
23	(Czech Republic) Jan Kopecký	(Czech Republic) Pavel Dresler	(Czech Republic) Škoda Motorsport	Škoda Fabia R5 Evo	M
World Rally Championship-2 entries
41	(Poland) Kajetan Kajetanowicz	(Poland) Maciej Szczepaniak	(Poland) Kajetan Kajetanowicz (Note: Entry operated by Lotos Dynamic Rally Team.)	Škoda Fabia R5	P
42	(Italy) Fabio Andolfi	(Italy) Simone Scattolin	(Italy) Fabio Andolfi (Note: Entry operated by ACI Team Italia WRC.)	Škoda Fabia R5	P
43	(Norway) Henning Solberg	(Austria) Ilka Minor	(Norway) Henning Solberg (Note: Entry operated by Toksport WRT.)	Škoda Fabia R5	M
44	(Bolivia) Marco Bulacia Wilkinson	(Argentina) Fabian Cretu	(Bolivia) Marco Bulacia Wilkinson (Note: Entry operated by VIALCO Racing.)	Škoda Fabia R5	M
45	(Brazil) Paulo Nobre	(Brazil) Gabriel Morales	(Brazil) Paulo Nobre (Note: Entry operated by Palmeirinha Rally.)	Škoda Fabia R5	P
46	(Italy) "Pedro" (Note: Pseudonym of Massimo Pedretti.)	(Italy) Emanuele Baldaccini	(Italy) "Pedro" (Note: Entry supported by M-Sport.)	Ford Fiesta R5 Mk. II	P
47	(Portugal) Diogo Salvi	(Portugal) Hugo Magalhães	(Portugal) Diogo Salvi	Škoda Fabia R5	M
48	(Turkey) Burak Cukurova	(Turkey) Vedat Bostanci	(Turkey) Burak Cukurova	Škoda Fabia R5	P
49	(Turkey) Murat Bostanci	(Turkey) Onur Vatansever	(Turkey) Murat Bostanci	Ford Fiesta R5	P
50	(Turkey) Deniz Fahri	(Turkey) Bahadir Gücenmez	(Turkey) Deniz Fahri	Škoda Fabia R5	P
51	(India) Gaurav Gill	(Australia) Glenn Macneall	(India) Gaurav Gill	Ford Fiesta R5 Mk. II	M
52	(Turkey) Bugra Banaz	(Turkey) Burak Erdener	(Turkey) Bugra Banaz	Ford Fiesta R5	P
53	(Turkey) Bora Manyera	(Turkey) Cem Cerkez	(Turkey) Bora Manyera	Škoda Fabia R5	P

=== Route ===
Two brand new stages were introduced into the route, while the twisty Çiçekli stage has moved from Friday to Sunday and runs in opposite direction.

==== Itinerary ====
All dates and times are TRT (UTC+3).

Date	Time	No.	Stage name	Distance
12 September	10:00	—	Asparan [Shakedown]	4.70 km
Leg 1 — 162.84 km
12 September	20:08	SS1	SSS Turkey	2.00 km
13 September	8:08	SS2	İçmeler 1	24.75 km
13 September	9:31	SS3	Çetibeli 1	38.10 km
13 September	10:54	SS4	Ula 1	17.57 km
13 September	14:17	SS5	İçmeler 2	24.75 km
13 September	15:40	SS6	Çetibeli 2	38.10 km
13 September	17:03	SS7	Ula 2	17.57 km
Leg 2 — 117.16 km
14 September	8:35	SS8	Yeşilbelde 1	32.83 km
14 September	10:08	SS9	Datça 1	8.75 km
14 September	11:14	SS10	Kızlan 1	17.00 km
14 September	13:52	SS11	Yeşilbelde 2	32.83 km
14 September	15:08	SS12	Datça 2	8.75 km
14 September	16:04	SS13	Kızlan 2	17.00 km
Leg 3 — 38.77 km
15 September	9:38	SS14	Marmaris 1	7.14 km
15 September	10:32	SS15	Gökçe	11.32 km
15 September	11:20	SS16	Çiçekli	13.17 km
15 September	13:18	SS17	Marmaris 2 [Power Stage]	7.14 km

== Report ==
=== World Rally Cars ===
The M-Sport Ford WRT crew of Elfyn Evans and Scott Martin had been due to return, having missed the Rallies of Finland and Germany when Evans injured himself in a pre-event testing accident while preparing for Rally Finland. However, Evans' recovery necessitated further delays, with Wales Rally GB earmarked for their return.

Several drivers suffered punctures, including three Toyota drivers and Dani Sordo. Esapekka Lappi led into the second leg, following by champion teammate Sébastien Ogier. Thierry Neuville was in the eighth spot after the morning loop, but a masterful drive in the afternoon loop promoted the Belgian to third.

Saturday was full of dramas. At the opening stage of the leg, championship contender Neuville went off the road and lost approximately four minutes, which dropped him down to ninth. Moments later, championship leader Ott Tänak was out as well. His Yaris broke down at the road section and was unable to move further, which means his day was over. Following Ogier's major rivals in troubles, the defending world champion put himself on the top of the leaderboard as of Friday, just 0.2 second ahead of teammate Lappi. Eventually, they both safely completed the rally to bring Citroën their first 1-2 finish since 2015 Rally Argentina.

==== Classification ====
Position		No.	Driver	Co-driver	Entrant	Car	Time	Difference	Points	
Event	Class	No.	Driver	Co-driver	Entrant	Car	Time	Difference	Event	Stage
1	1	1	Sébastien Ogier	Julien Ingrassia	Citroën Total WRT	Citroën C3 WRC	3:50:12.1	0.0	25	3
2	2	4	Esapekka Lappi	Janne Ferm	Citroën Total WRT	Citroën C3 WRC	3:50:46.8	+34.7	18	0
3	3	89	Andreas Mikkelsen	Anders Jæger-Amland	Hyundai Shell Mobis WRT	Hyundai i20 Coupe WRC	3:51:16.6	+1:04.5	15	0
4	4	3	Teemu Suninen	Marko Salminen	M-Sport Ford WRT	Ford Fiesta WRC	3:51:47.2	+1:35.1	12	1
5	5	6	Dani Sordo	Carlos del Barrio	Hyundai Shell Mobis WRT	Hyundai i20 Coupe WRC	3:52:38.0	+2:25.9	10	0
6	6	10	Jari-Matti Latvala	Miikka Anttila	Toyota Gazoo Racing WRT	Toyota Yaris WRC	3:53:11.2	+2:59.1	8	2
7	7	5	Kris Meeke	Sebastian Marshall	Toyota Gazoo Racing WRT	Toyota Yaris WRC	3:54:05.4	+3:53.3	6	0
8	8	11	Thierry Neuville	Nicolas Gilsoul	Hyundai Shell Mobis WRT	Hyundai i20 Coupe WRC	3:55:46.9	+5:34.8	4	4
9	9	7	Pontus Tidemand	Ola Fløene	M-Sport Ford WRT	Ford Fiesta WRC	3:57:35.0	+7:22.9	2	0
16	10	8	Ott Tänak	Martin Järveoja	Toyota Gazoo Racing WRT	Toyota Yaris WRC	4:29:22.3	+39:10.2	0	5

==== Special stages ====
Date	No.	Stage name	Distance	Winners	Car	Time	Class leaders
12 September	—	Asparan [Shakedown]	4.70 km	Meeke / Marshall	Toyota Yaris WRC	3:25.3	—N/a
12 September	SS1	SSS Turkey	2.00 km	Neuville / Gilsoul; Mikkelsen / Jæger-Amland	Hyundai i20 Coupe WRC; Hyundai i20 Coupe WRC	2:02.6	Neuville / Gilsoul; Mikkelsen / Jæger-Amland
13 September	SS2	İçmeler 1	24.75 km	Latvala / Anttila	Toyota Yaris WRC	18:12.4	Latvala / Anttila
13 September	SS3	Çetibeli 1	38.10 km	Lappi / Ferm	Citroën C3 WRC	28:01.2	Lappi / Ferm
13 September	SS4	Ula 1	17.57 km	Latvala / Anttila	Toyota Yaris WRC	12:21.6	Lappi / Ferm
13 September	SS5	İçmeler 2	24.75 km	Meeke / Marshall	Toyota Yaris WRC	18:05.8	Lappi / Ferm
13 September	SS6	Çetibeli 2	38.10 km	Neuville / Gilsoul	Hyundai i20 Coupe WRC	27:59.9	Lappi / Ferm
13 September	SS7	Ula 2	17.57 km	Sordo / del Barrio	Hyundai i20 Coupe WRC	12:29.3	Lappi / Ferm
14 September	SS8	Yeşilbelde 1	32.83 km	Ogier / Ingrassia	Citroën C3 WRC	25:42.6	Lappi / Ferm
14 September	SS9	Datça 1	8.75 km	Mikkelsen / Jæger-Amland	Hyundai i20 Coupe WRC	7:05.3	Lappi / Ferm
14 September	SS10	Kızlan 1	17.00 km	Lappi / Ferm	Citroën C3 WRC	7:16.7	Lappi / Ferm
14 September	SS11	Yeşilbelde 2	32.83 km	Ogier / Ingrassia	Citroën C3 WRC	25:19.6	Lappi / Ferm
14 September	SS12	Datça 2	8.75 km	Neuville / Gilsoul	Hyundai i20 Coupe WRC	6:59.1	Ogier / Ingrassia
14 September	SS13	Kızlan 2	17.00 km	Lappi / Ferm	Citroën C3 WRC	7:16.0	Ogier / Ingrassia
15 September	SS14	Marmaris 1	7.14 km	Tänak / Järveoja	Toyota Yaris WRC	5:04.7	Ogier / Ingrassia
15 September	SS15	Gökçe	11.32 km	Latvala / Anttila	Toyota Yaris WRC	8:34.1	Ogier / Ingrassia
15 September	SS16	Çiçekli	13.17 km	Mikkelsen / Jæger-Amland	Hyundai i20 Coupe WRC	11:01.3	Ogier / Ingrassia
15 September	SS17	Marmaris 2 [Power Stage]	7.14 km	Tänak / Järveoja	Toyota Yaris WRC	4:55.2	Ogier / Ingrassia

==== Championship standings ====
Pos.	Drivers' championships			Co-drivers' championships			Manufacturers' championships		
Pos.	Move	Driver	Points	Move	Co-driver	Points	Move	Manufacturer	Points
1		Ott Tänak	210		Martin Järveoja	210		Hyundai Shell Mobis WRT	314
2	1	Sébastien Ogier	193	1	Julien Ingrassia	193		Toyota Gazoo Racing WRT	295
3	1	Thierry Neuville	180	1	Nicolas Gilsoul	180		Citroën Total WRT	259
4	1	Andreas Mikkelsen	94	1	Anders Jæger-Amland	94		M-Sport Ford WRT	184
5	1	Kris Meeke	86	1	Sebastian Marshall	86			

=== World Rally Championship-2 Pro ===
Jan Kopecký survived a day of "rockstorm" after two punctures, while his teammate Kalle Rovanperä retired from the day as he rolled his Fabia in the morning's opening test. However, Kopecký suffered yet another puncture, which lost his lead to Gus Greensmith. However, Greensmith rolled his Fiesta R5 after the flying finish at the second to last stage. He was able to complete the final test to take his second Pro victory.

==== Classification ====
Position		No.	Driver	Co-driver	Entrant	Car	Time	Difference	Points	
Event	Class	No.	Driver	Co-driver	Entrant	Car	Time	Difference	Class	Event
10	1	22	Gus Greensmith	Elliott Edmondson	M-Sport Ford WRT	Ford Fiesta R5 Mk. II	4:05:30.8	0.0	**25**	**1**
11	2	23	Jan Kopecký	Pavel Dresler	Škoda Motorsport	Škoda Fabia R5 Evo	4:06:00.2	+29.4	**18**	**0**
18	3	21	Kalle Rovanperä	Jonne Halttunen	Škoda Motorsport	Škoda Fabia R5 Evo	4:33:21.2	+27:50.4	**15**	**0**

==== Special stages ====
Results in bold denote first in the RC2 class, the class which both the WRC-2 Pro and WRC-2 championships run to.

Date	No.	Stage name	Distance	Winners	Car	Time	Class leaders
12 September	—	Asparan [Shakedown]	4.70 km	**Greensmith / Edmondson**	Ford Fiesta R5 Mk. II	3:38.7	—N/a
12 September	SS1	SSS Turkey	2.00 km	**Rovanperä / Halttunen**	Škoda Fabia R5 Evo	2:06.9	Rovanperä / Halttunen
13 September	SS2	İçmeler 1	24.75 km	**Kopecký / Dresler**	Škoda Fabia R5 Evo	19:04.3	Kopecký / Dresler
13 September	SS3	Çetibeli 1	38.10 km	Kopecký / Dresler	Škoda Fabia R5 Evo	30:27.5	Kopecký / Dresler
13 September	SS4	Ula 1	17.57 km	Kopecký / Dresler	Škoda Fabia R5 Evo	13:04.8	Kopecký / Dresler
13 September	SS5	İçmeler 2	24.75 km	**Greensmith / Edmondson**	Ford Fiesta R5 Mk. II	19:22.4	Kopecký / Dresler
13 September	SS6	Çetibeli 2	38.10 km	Greensmith / Edmondson	Ford Fiesta R5 Mk. II	30:23.2	Kopecký / Dresler
13 September	SS7	Ula 2	17.57 km	Greensmith / Edmondson	Ford Fiesta R5 Mk. II	13:03.3	Kopecký / Dresler
14 September	SS8	Yeşilbelde 1	32.83 km	**Rovanperä / Halttunen**	Škoda Fabia R5 Evo	26:59.2	Kopecký / Dresler
14 September	SS9	Datça 1	8.75 km	**Greensmith / Edmondson**	Ford Fiesta R5 Mk. II	7:21.4	Kopecký / Dresler
14 September	SS10	Kızlan 1	17.00 km	**Rovanperä / Halttunen**	Škoda Fabia R5 Evo	7:36.3	Kopecký / Dresler
14 September	SS11	Yeşilbelde 2	32.83 km	**Rovanperä / Halttunen**	Škoda Fabia R5 Evo	26:51.2	Greensmith / Edmondson
14 September	SS12	Datça 2	8.75 km	**Rovanperä / Halttunen**	Škoda Fabia R5 Evo	7:21.3	Greensmith / Edmondson
14 September	SS13	Kızlan 2	17.00 km	**Rovanperä / Halttunen**	Škoda Fabia R5 Evo	7:32.4	Greensmith / Edmondson
15 September	SS14	Marmaris 1	7.14 km	**Kopecký / Dresler**	Škoda Fabia R5 Evo	5:21.1	Greensmith / Edmondson
15 September	SS15	Gökçe	11.32 km	**Rovanperä / Halttunen**	Škoda Fabia R5 Evo	8:50.6	Greensmith / Edmondson
15 September	SS16	Çiçekli	13.17 km	**Rovanperä / Halttunen**	Škoda Fabia R5 Evo	11:12.6	Greensmith / Edmondson
15 September	SS17	Marmaris 2	7.14 km	**Kopecký / Dresler**	Škoda Fabia R5 Evo	5:19.9	Greensmith / Edmondson

==== Championship standings ====
Pos.	Drivers' championships			Co-drivers' championships			Manufacturers' championships		
Pos.	Move	Driver	Points	Move	Co-driver	Points	Move	Manufacturer	Points
1		Kalle Rovanperä	166		Jonne Halttunen	166		Škoda Motorsport	257
2	1	Gus Greensmith	110	1	Elliott Edmondson	110		M-Sport Ford WRT	220
3	1	Mads Østberg	110	1	Torstein Eriksen	110		Citroën Total	110
4	1	Jan Kopecký	79	1	Pavel Dresler	79			
5	1	Łukasz Pieniążek	74	1	Kamil Heller	62			

=== World Rally Championship-2 ===
Local driver Bugra Banaz's rally was over as his Fiesta R5 burnt out on the liaison section to the final stage. Kajetan Kajetanowicz held a three-minute lead after Saturday after two drama-free days. However, he broke a driveshaft on Sunday, but managed to bring his wounded Fabia home to take his first victory of season in the category.

==== Classification ====
Position		No.	Driver	Co-driver	Entrant	Car	Time	Difference	Points	
Event	Class	No.	Driver	Co-driver	Entrant	Car	Time	Difference	Class	Event
12	1	41	Kajetan Kajetanowicz	Maciej Szczepaniak	Kajetan Kajetanowicz	Škoda Fabia R5	4:06:00.4	0.0	25	0
13	2	44	Marco Bulacia Wilkinson	Fabian Cretu	Marco Bulacia Wilkinson	Škoda Fabia R5	4:07:40.3	+1:39.9	18	0
14	3	42	Fabio Andolfi	Simone Scattolin	Fabio Andolfi	Škoda Fabia R5	4:15:14.2	+9:13.8	15	0
15	4	43	Henning Solberg	Ilka Minor	Henning Solberg	Škoda Fabia R5	4:20:31.4	+14:31.0	12	0
17	5	48	Burak Cukurova	Vedat Bostanci	Burak Cukurova	Škoda Fabia R5	4:29:37.5	+23:37.1	10	0
19	6	45	Paulo Nobre	Gabriel Morales	Paulo Nobre	Škoda Fabia R5	4:34:17.5	+28:17.1	8	0
20	7	53	Bora Manyera	Cem Cerkez	Bora Manyera	Škoda Fabia R5	4:43:03.5	+37:03.1	6	0
22	8	47	Diogo Salvi	Hugo Magalhães	Diogo Salvi	Škoda Fabia R5	4:49:20.5	+43:20.1	4	0
23	9	46	"Pedro"	Emanuele Baldaccini	"Pedro"	Ford Fiesta R5 Mk. II	5:28:22.8	+1:22:22.4	2	0
Retired SS16		51	Gaurav Gill	Glenn Macneall	Gaurav Gill	Ford Fiesta R5 Mk. II	Mechanical		0	0
Retired SS8		49	Murat Bostanci	Onur Vatansever	Murat Bostanci	Ford Fiesta R5	Mechanical		0	0
Retired SS7		52	Bugra Banaz	Burak Erdener	Bugra Banaz	Ford Fiesta R5	Fire		0	0
Retired SS5		50	Deniz Fahri	Bahadir Gücenmez	Deniz Fahri	Škoda Fabia R5	Mechanical		0	0

==== Special stages ====
Results in bold denote first in the RC2 class, the class which both the WRC-2 Pro and WRC-2 championships run to.

Date	No.	Stage name	Distance	Winners	Car	Time	Class leaders
12 September	—	Asparan [Shakedown]	4.70 km	Gill / Macneall	Ford Fiesta R5 Mk. II	3:39.9	—N/a
12 September	SS1	SSS Turkey	2.00 km	Kajetanowicz / Szczepaniak	Skoda Fabia R5	2:08.2	Kajetanowicz / Szczepaniak
13 September	SS2	İçmeler 1	24.75 km	Kajetanowicz / Szczepaniak	Skoda Fabia R5	19:05.8	Kajetanowicz / Szczepaniak
13 September	SS3	Çetibeli 1	38.10 km	**Kajetanowicz / Szczepaniak**	Skoda Fabia R5	30:07.0	Kajetanowicz / Szczepaniak
13 September	SS4	Ula 1	17.57 km	**Kajetanowicz / Szczepaniak**	Skoda Fabia R5	12:56.7	Kajetanowicz / Szczepaniak
13 September	SS5	İçmeler 2	24.75 km	Andolfi / Scattolin	Skoda Fabia R5	19:25.1	Kajetanowicz / Szczepaniak
13 September	SS6	Çetibeli 2	38.10 km	**Andolfi / Scattolin**	Skoda Fabia R5	30:21.3	Kajetanowicz / Szczepaniak
13 September	SS7	Ula 2	17.57 km	**Andolfi / Scattolin**	Skoda Fabia R5	13:02.6	Kajetanowicz / Szczepaniak
14 September	SS8	Yeşilbelde 1	32.83 km	Andolfi / Scattolin	Skoda Fabia R5	27:01.0	Kajetanowicz / Szczepaniak
14 September	SS9	Datça 1	8.75 km	Kajetanowicz / Szczepaniak	Skoda Fabia R5	7:23.2	Kajetanowicz / Szczepaniak
14 September	SS10	Kızlan 1	17.00 km	Kajetanowicz / Szczepaniak	Skoda Fabia R5	7:46.4	Kajetanowicz / Szczepaniak
14 September	SS11	Yeşilbelde 2	32.83 km	Bulacia Wilkinson / Cretu	Škoda Fabia R5	27:08.9	Kajetanowicz / Szczepaniak
14 September	SS12	Datça 2	8.75 km	Kajetanowicz / Szczepaniak	Skoda Fabia R5	7:22.1	Kajetanowicz / Szczepaniak
14 September	SS13	Kızlan 2	17.00 km	Bulacia Wilkinson / Cretu	Škoda Fabia R5	7:43.3	Kajetanowicz / Szczepaniak
15 September	SS14	Marmaris 1	7.14 km	Solberg / Minor	Škoda Fabia R5	8:23.2	Kajetanowicz / Szczepaniak
15 September	SS15	Gökçe	11.32 km	Solberg / Minor	Škoda Fabia R5	8:58.8	Kajetanowicz / Szczepaniak
15 September	SS16	Çiçekli	13.17 km	Solberg / Minor	Škoda Fabia R5	11:19.2	Kajetanowicz / Szczepaniak
15 September	SS17	Marmaris 2	7.14 km	Bulacia Wilkinson / Cretu	Škoda Fabia R5	5:29.7	Kajetanowicz / Szczepaniak

==== Championship standings ====
Pos.	Drivers' championships			Co-drivers' championships		
Pos.	Move	Driver	Points	Move	Co-driver	Points
1	4	Kajetan Kajetanowicz	73	4	Maciej Szczepaniak	73
2	1	Nikolay Gryazin	73	1	Yaroslav Fedorov	73
3	1	Benito Guerra	69	1	Jaime Zapata	69
4	1	Pierre-Louis Loubet	63	1	Vincent Landais	63
5	1	Ole Christian Veiby	50	1	Jonas Andersson	50

== Notes ==
Previous rally: 2019 Rallye Deutschland	2019 FIA World Rally Championship	Next rally: 2019 Wales Rally GB
Previous rally: 2018 Rally Turkey	2019 Rally Turkey	Next rally: 2020 Rally Turkey
