= Electronic differential =

In automotive engineering the electronic differential is a form of differential, which provides the required torque for each driving wheel and allows different wheel speeds. It is used in place of the mechanical differential in multi-drive systems. When cornering, the inner and outer wheels rotate at different speeds, because the inner wheels describe a smaller turning radius. The electronic differential uses the steering wheel command signal and the motor speed signals to control the power to each wheel so that all wheels are supplied with the torque they need.

== Functional description ==
The classical automobile drivetrain is composed of a single Internal combustion engine providing torque to one or more driving wheels. The most common solution is to use a mechanical device to distribute torque to the wheels. This mechanical differential allows different wheel speeds when cornering. With the emergence of electric vehicles new drive train configurations are possible. Multi-drive systems become easy to implement due to the large power density of electric motors. These systems, usually with one motor per driving wheel, need an additional top level controller which performs the same task as a mechanical differential.

The ED scheme has several advantages over a mechanical differential:

- simplicity - it avoids additional mechanical parts such as a gearbox or clutch;
- independent torque for each wheel allows additional capabilities (e.g., traction control, stability control);
- reconfigurable - it is reprogrammable in order to include new features or tuned according to the driver’s preferences;
- allows distributed regenerative braking;
- the torque is not limited by the wheel with least traction, as it is with a mechanical differential.
- faster response times;
- accurate knowledge of traction torque per wheel.

However, the ED scheme also come with many disadvantages and drawbacks:

- errors and glitches are prone to happen, thus giving inaccurate reading and output as compared to conventional differential. These result in the wheels either receiving too much or little power and torque.
- increased premature tyre wear due to the inaccurate reading and output as compared to conventional differential.
- higher cost to manufacture and maintain the electronic systems.

== Applications ==
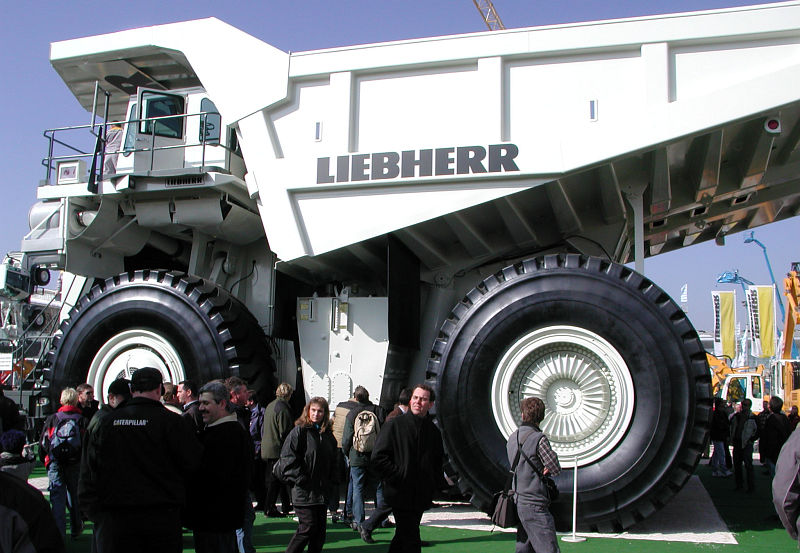
Liebherr T 282B

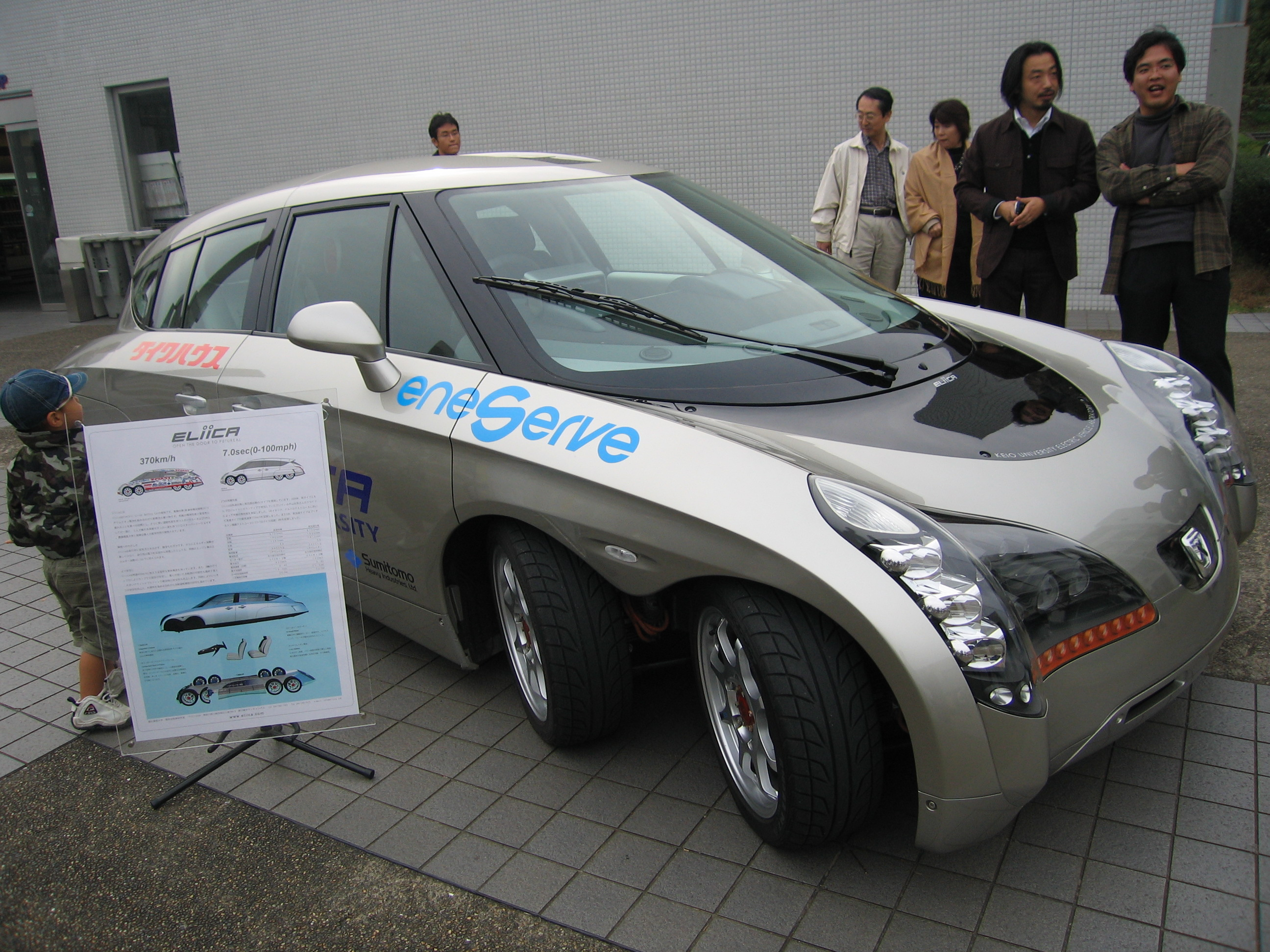
Eliica shown at Intex Osaka

Several applications of this technology have proven successful and have increased vehicle performance. The application range is wide and includes the huge T 282B from Liebherr which is considered the world largest truck. This earth-hauling truck is driven by an electric propulsion system composed by two independent electric motors. These motors providing a maximum power of 2700 kW are controlled in order to adjust their speeds when cornering, thus increasing traction and reducing tire wear. The Eliica is also equipped with electronic differential; this eight-wheeled electric vehicle is capable of driving up to 370 km/h whilst maintaining perfect torque control on each wheel. Smaller vehicles for traction purposes and System on Chip controllers for generic vehicular applications are also available.
