= 2018 Rally Turkey =

Motor rally competition

2018 Rally Turkey: 11. Marmaris Rally Turkey 2018
Round 10 of 13 in the 2018 World Rally Championship
← Previous event	Next event →
- Host country: Turkey
- Rally base: Marmaris, Muğla
- Dates run: 13 – 16 September 2018
- Start location: Marmaris Castle, Muğla
- Finish location: Marmaris, Muğla
- Stages: 17 (312.44 km; 194.14 miles)
- Stage surface: Gravel
- Transport distance: 562.90 km (349.77 miles)
- Overall distance: 875.34 km (543.91 miles)

Statistics
- Crews registered: 52
- Crews: 45 at start, 29 at finish

Overall results
- Overall winner: (Estonia) Ott Tänak (Estonia) Martin Järveoja (Japan) Toyota Gazoo Racing WRT; 3:59:24.5
- Power Stage winner: (Belgium) Thierry Neuville (Belgium) Nicolas Gilsoul (South Korea) Hyundai Shell Mobis WRT

Support category results
- WRC-2 winner: (Czech Republic) Jan Kopecký (Czech Republic) Pavel Dresler (Czech Republic) Škoda Motorsport II; 4:17:49.7
- WRC-3 winner: (Sweden) Emil Bergkvist (Sweden) Joakim Sjöberg (Sweden) Emil Bergkvist; 4:40:03.2

The 2018 Rally Turkey (formally known as the Marmaris Rally Turkey 2018) was a motor racing event for rally cars that was held over four days between 13 and 16 September 2018. It marked the return and the eleventh running of Rally Turkey, last held in 2010. The event was the tenth round of the 2018 FIA World Rally Championship and its support series, the WRC-2 and WRC-3 championships. It was also the fifth and the last round of the Junior WRC championship. The event was based in Marmaris in Muğla and consists of seventeen special stages totalling 312.44 km (194.14 mi) in competitive kilometres.

Coming into the event, Sébastien Loeb and Daniel Elena were the reigning rally winning crew, but they chose not to participate in this year's event. Ott Tänak and Martin Järveoja were the rally winners. Their team, Toyota Gazoo Racing WRT, were the manufacturers' winners. The Škoda Motorsport II crew of Jan Kopecký and Pavel Dresler won in the World Rally Championship-2 in a Škoda Fabia R5, while the Swedish crew of Emil Bergkvist and Joakim Sjöberg won in the World Rally Championship-3 and Junior World Rally Championship.

After five rounds' battle, Emil Bergkvist and Johan Johansson became the drivers' and co-drivers' champion of 2018 Junior World Rally Championship respectively.

== Background ==
=== Championship standings prior to the event ===
Thierry Neuville and Nicolas Gilsoul entered the round with a twenty-three-point lead in the World Championship for Drivers and Co-drivers. In the World Championship for Manufacturers, Hyundai Shell Mobis WRT held a thirteen-point lead over Toyota Gazoo Racing WRT.

=== Entry list ===
The following crews were entered into the rally. The entry list consisted of thirteen World Rally Car entries, fifteen in the World Rally Championship-2, and fourteen entries in the World Rally Championship-3, thirteen of which were eligible to score points in the Junior World Rally Championship.

No.	Entrant	Driver	Co-Driver	Car	Tyre
World Rally Car entries
1	(United Kingdom) M-Sport Ford WRT	(France) Sébastien Ogier	(France) Julien Ingrassia	Ford Fiesta WRC	M
2	(United Kingdom) M-Sport Ford WRT	(United Kingdom) Elfyn Evans	(United Kingdom) Daniel Barritt	Ford Fiesta WRC	M
3	(United Kingdom) M-Sport Ford WRT	(Finland) Teemu Suninen	(Finland) Mikko Markkula	Ford Fiesta WRC	M
4	(South Korea) Hyundai Shell Mobis WRT	(Norway) Andreas Mikkelsen	(Norway) Anders Jæger-Synnevaag	Hyundai i20 Coupe WRC	M
5	(South Korea) Hyundai Shell Mobis WRT	(Belgium) Thierry Neuville	(Belgium) Nicolas Gilsoul	Hyundai i20 Coupe WRC	M
6	(South Korea) Hyundai Shell Mobis WRT	(New Zealand) Hayden Paddon	(United Kingdom) Sebastian Marshall	Hyundai i20 Coupe WRC	M
7	(Japan) Toyota Gazoo Racing WRT	(Finland) Jari-Matti Latvala	(Finland) Miikka Anttila	Toyota Yaris WRC	M
8	(Japan) Toyota Gazoo Racing WRT	(Estonia) Ott Tänak	(Estonia) Martin Järveoja	Toyota Yaris WRC	M
9	(Japan) Toyota Gazoo Racing WRT	(Finland) Esapekka Lappi	(Finland) Janne Ferm	Toyota Yaris WRC	M
10	(France) Citroën Total Abu Dhabi WRT	(Norway) Mads Østberg	(Norway) Torstein Eriksen	Citroën C3 WRC	M
11	(France) Citroën Total Abu Dhabi WRT	(Republic of Ireland) Craig Breen	(United Kingdom) Scott Martin	Citroën C3 WRC	M
12	(France) Citroën Total Abu Dhabi WRT	(United Arab Emirates) Khalid Al-Qassimi	(United Kingdom) Chris Patterson	Citroën C3 WRC	M
21	(Saudi Arabia) Yazeed Racing	(Saudi Arabia) Yazeed Al-Rajhi	(United Kingdom) Michael Orr	Ford Fiesta RS WRC	M
World Rally Championship-2 entries
31	(Czech Republic) Škoda Motorsport II	(Sweden) Pontus Tidemand	(Sweden) Jonas Andersson	Škoda Fabia R5	M
32	(Czech Republic) Škoda Motorsport II	(Czech Republic) Jan Kopecký	(Czech Republic) Pavel Dresler	Škoda Fabia R5	M
33	(United Kingdom) Gus Greensmith	(United Kingdom) Gus Greensmith	(United States) Alessandro Gelsomino	Ford Fiesta R5	M
34	(Chile) Pedro Heller	(Chile) Pedro Heller	(Argentina) Pablo Olmos	Ford Fiesta R5	M
35	(Italy) Motorsport Italia	(Portugal) Diogo Salvi	(Portugal) Hugo Magalhães	Škoda Fabia R5	P
36	(Poland) Lotos Rally Team	(Poland) Kajetan Kajetanowicz	(Poland) Maciej Szczepaniak	Ford Fiesta R5	P
37	(Romania) Simone Tempestini	(Romania) Simone Tempestini	(Romania) Sergio Itu	Citroën C3 R5	M
38	(Turkey) Castrol Ford Team Türkiye	(Turkey) Murat Bostanci	(Turkey) Onur Vatansever	Ford Fiesta R5	P
39	(Germany) Toksport WRT	(United Kingdom) Chris Ingram	(United Kingdom) Ross Whittock	Škoda Fabia R5	P
40	Ford Motorsport Turkey	(Turkey) Yağız Avci	(Turkey) Ersan Alkir	Ford Fiesta R5	P
41	(Turkey) BC Vision Motorsport	(Turkey) Burak Çukurova	(Turkey) Vedat Bostanci	Škoda Fabia R5	P
42	Ford Motorsport Turkey	(Turkey) Deniz Fahri	(Turkey) Bahadir Gücenmez	Ford Fiesta R5	P
43	(Turkey) Bora Manyera	(Turkey) Bora Manyera	(Turkey) Cem Çerkez	Ford Fiesta R5	P
44	(Turkey) BC Vision Motorsport	(Turkey) Erkan Güral	(Turkey) Burak Koçoğlu	Škoda Fabia R5	P
45	(Greece) George Vassilakis	(Greece) George Vassilakis	(Greece) Spiros Koltsidas	Ford Fiesta R5	P
World Rally Championship-3 entries
61	(Sweden) Emil Bergkvist	(Sweden) Emil Bergkvist^{‡}	(Sweden) Patrik Barth	Ford Fiesta R2T	P
62	(Sweden) Denis Rådström	(Sweden) Denis Rådström^{‡}	(Sweden) Johan Johansson	Ford Fiesta R2T	P
63	Équipe de France FFSA Rally	(France) Jean-Baptiste Franceschi^{‡}	(France) Romain Courbon	Ford Fiesta R2T	P
64	(Estonia) OT Racing	(Estonia) Ken Torn^{‡}	(Estonia) Kuldar Sikk	Ford Fiesta R2T	P
65	(Germany) ADAC Sachsen	(Germany) Julius Tannert^{‡}	(Austria) Jürgen Heigl	Ford Fiesta R2T	P
66	(Republic of Ireland) Callum Devine	(Republic of Ireland) Callum Devine^{‡}	(Republic of Ireland) Brian Hoy	Ford Fiesta R2T	P
67	(Italy) ACI Team Italia	(Italy) Enrico Oldrati^{‡}	(Italy) Danilo Fappani	Ford Fiesta R2T	P
68	(Turkey) Castrol Ford Team Turkiye	(Turkey) Bugra Banaz^{‡}	(Turkey) Burak Erdener	Ford Fiesta R2T	P
69	(Italy) ACI Team Italia	(Italy) Luca Bottarelli^{‡}	(Italy) Manuel Fenoli	Ford Fiesta R2T	P
70	(New Zealand) Holder Brothers Racing	(New Zealand) David Holder^{‡}	(New Zealand) Jason Farmer	Ford Fiesta R2T	P
71	(United Kingdom) Tom Williams	(United Kingdom) Tom Williams^{‡}	(United Kingdom) Phil Hall	Ford Fiesta R2T	P
72	(Chile) Emilio Fernández	(Chile) Emilio Fernández^{‡}	(Chile) Joaquin Riquelme	Ford Fiesta R2T	P
73	(Romania) Raul Badiu	(Romania) Raul Badiu^{‡}	(Romania) Gabriel Lazar	Ford Fiesta R2T	P
74	(United Kingdom) Louise Cook	(United Kingdom) Louise Cook	(United Kingdom) Stefan Davis	Ford Fiesta R2	M
Other major entries
81	(Norway) Henning Solberg	(Norway) Henning Solberg	(Austria) Ilka Minor-Petrasko	Škoda Fabia R5	M

Notes

- ^‡ — Driver and co-driver are eligible to score points in the FIA Junior World Rally Championship.

== Report ==
=== Pre-event ===
Junior WRC championship will be worth double points to encourage crews to contest all five events of the championship.

=== Thursday ===
Andreas Mikkelsen, driving an i20, won the first stage of the rally, 2.5 seconds faster than Craig Breen. Ott Tänak cleared the stage in third, ahead of championship leader Thierry Neuville. Two WRC 2 cars Kajetan Kajetanowicz and Jan Kopecký completed the stage in fifth and sixth place respectively. From seventh to tenth were Esapekka Lappi, Mads Østberg, Jari-Matti Latvala and Elfyn Evans, who was the only Fiesta in top ten.

=== Friday ===
Championship leader Thierry Neuville, who was being first on the road, squeezed his i20 on top. Defending world champion Sébastien Ogier and Andreas Mikkelsen completed the day in second and third respectively. The gap between the top three was only 2.6 seconds. Jari-Matti Latvala and teammate Ott Tänak finished in fourth and fifth, with Hayden Paddon in sixth. Esapekka Lappi, who was struggling with his Yaris' differential, cleared the day in seventh place. Early leader Craig Breen suffered a puncture and dropped down to eighth place, while his teammate Mads Østberg and Elfyn Evans both retired from the day in the penultimate stage with broken suspension. Teemu Suninen completed the day in ninth place after a consistent performance, with rally veteran Henning Solberg covered the top ten.

=== Saturday ===
The second leg of the rally turned out to be disastrous for some of the crews. Friday leader and championship leader Thierry Neuville retired from the day when the front left suspension punched though his i20's bonnet in the morning's opening stage, which made Sébastien Ogier the new rally leader for a while; this lead was short-lived when Ogier's Ford Fiesta sustained damage on the front right wishbone, dropping the defending champion's lead down to fourth after a one-minute time penalty for being late due to a roadside fix. In the afternoon loop, his rally went from bad to worse — he went off the road and forced to retire from the day. Andreas Mikkelsen reclaimed the position of rally leader, but a transmission problem, which left his i20 with only rear-wheel drive all afternoon, caused him drop down to fifth overall. Craig Breen fared far worse when his C3 emitted smoke during SS11 and after that stage, the car was on fire and completely burned out, forcing the Irishman to retire from the rally. Teammate Mads Østberg suffered a turbo issue and also retired from the leg. Esapekka Lappi retired his Yaris from the event in sixth when he crashed went perching from a cliff.

The biggest beneficiary from the chaotic rally was Ott Tänak, who ended the day on top, while his teammate Jari-Matti Latvala, who overcame a hydraulic pressure issue, completed the day 13.1 seconds behind in second place. Hayden Paddon and Teemu Suninen got a trouble-free day and cleared the leg in third and fourth respectively. Andreas Mikkelsen, who was the last RC1 driver without retirement in top ten, finished the leg in fifth, over six minutes off the lead. Rally veteran Henning Solberg completed the day in sixth place, followed by Elfyn Evans, who was running under Rally2 regulations. Three WRC 2 category drivers Jan Kopecký, Simone Tempestini and Chris Ingram completed the leaderboard.

=== Sunday ===
After a four-day battle, Ott Tänak won his third consecutive rally victory in Marmaris, while teammate Jari-Matti Latvala, who had to defer to Tänak following team orders from the Toyota team management, finished 22.3 seconds behind in second place. With a 1-2 formula, Toyota Gazoo Racing WRT moved up on top on the manufacturers' championships, five points over Hyundai Shell Mobis WRT. Hayden Paddon and Teemu Suninen stayed in third and fourth, with erstwhile leader Andreas Mikkelsen recovering from a broken front right driveshaft. Rally veteran Henning Solberg, WRC 2 category winner Jan Kopecký, Simone Tempestini and Chris Ingram covered from sixth to ninth. Defending world champion Sébastien Ogier returned to the rally under Rally2 regulations and finished in tenth overall after teammate Elfyn Evans was given a team order, which ordered the Welsh to check in five minutes early. This meant Evans was given a five-minute time penalty so that the Frenchman could gained one place. He eventually ended his weekend in tenth place, but claimed four Power Stage points. The winner of the Power Stage was championship leader Thierry Neuville, who was forced to retire from the leg on Saturday. Despite his Power Stage victory, his championship lead went down to thirteen points over the hat-trick player Ott Tänak, whose championship standings went up to second place.

== Classification ==
=== Top ten finishers ===
The following crews finished the rally in each class's top ten. (Note: Only crews contesting the World Rally Championship, World Rally Championship-2 and World Rally Championship-3 are listed.)

Position		No.	Driver	Co-driver	Entrant	Car	Time	Difference	Points	
Event	Class	No.	Driver	Co-driver	Entrant	Car	Time	Difference	Class	Stage
**Overall classification**
1	1	8	(Estonia) Ott Tänak	(Estonia) Martin Järveoja	(Japan) Toyota Gazoo Racing WRT	Toyota Yaris WRC	3:59:24.5	0.0	25	**3**
2	2	7	(Finland) Jari-Matti Latvala	(Finland) Miikka Anttila	(Japan) Toyota Gazoo Racing WRT	Toyota Yaris WRC	3:59:46.8	+22.3	18	**2**
3	3	6	(New Zealand) Hayden Paddon	(United Kingdom) Sebastian Marshall	(South Korea) Hyundai Shell Mobis WRT	Hyundai i20 Coupe WRC	4:01:10.8	+1:46.3	15	**0**
4	4	3	(Finland) Teemu Suninen	(Finland) Mikko Markkula	(United Kingdom) M-Sport Ford WRT	Ford Fiesta WRC	4:03:35.4	+4:10.9	12	**0**
5	5	4	(Norway) Andreas Mikkelsen	(Norway) Anders Jæger-Synnevaag	(South Korea) Hyundai Shell Mobis WRT	Hyundai i20 Coupe WRC	4:06:36.2	+7:11.7	10	**0**
6	6	81	(Norway) Henning Solberg	(Austria) Ilka Minor-Petrasko	(Norway) Henning Solberg	Škoda Fabia R5	4:13:05.1	+13:40.6	8	**0**
7	7	32	(Czech Republic) Jan Kopecký	(Czech Republic) Pavel Dresler	(Czech Republic) Škoda Motorsport II	Škoda Fabia R5	4:17:49.7	+18:25.2	6	**0**
8	8	37	(Romania) Simone Tempestini	(Romania) Sergio Itu	(Romania) Simone Tempestini	Citroën C3 R5	4:19:01.6	+19:37.1	4	**0**
9	9	39	(United Kingdom) Chris Ingram	(United Kingdom) Ross Whittock	(Turkey) Toksport WRT	Škoda Fabia R5	4:19:45.8	+20:21.3	2	**0**
10	10	1	(France) Sébastien Ogier	(France) Julien Ingrassia	(United Kingdom) M-Sport Ford WRT	Ford Fiesta WRC	4:20:15.7	+20:51.2	1	**4**
**World Rally Championship-2**
7	1	32	(Czech Republic) Jan Kopecký	(Czech Republic) Pavel Dresler	(Czech Republic) Škoda Motorsport II	Škoda Fabia R5	4:17:49.7	0.0	25	—
8	2	37	(Romania) Simone Tempestini	(Romania) Sergio Itu	(Romania) Simone Tempestini	Citroën C3 R5	4:19:01.6	+1:11.9	18	—
9	3	39	(United Kingdom) Chris Ingram	(United Kingdom) Ross Whittock	(Turkey) Toksport WRT	Škoda Fabia R5	4:19:45.8	+1:56.1	15	—
11	4	36	(Poland) Kajetan Kajetanowicz	(Poland) Maciej Szczepaniak	(Poland) Lotos Rally Team	Ford Fiesta R5	4:20:38.4	+2:48.7	12	—
13	5	34	(Chile) Pedro Heller	(Argentina) Pablo Olmos	(Chile) Pedro Heller	Ford Fiesta R5	4:25:30.9	+7:41.2	10	—
14	6	41	(Turkey) Burak Çukurova	(Turkey) Vedat Bostanci	(Turkey) BC Vision Motorsport	Škoda Fabia R5	4:31:46.1	+13:56.4	8	—
18	7	35	(Portugal) Diogo Salvi	(Portugal) Hugo Magalhães	(Italy) Motorsport Italia	Škoda Fabia R5	4:43:07.2	+25:17.5	6	—
22	8	43	(Turkey) Bora Manyera	(Turkey) Cem Çerkez	(Turkey) Bora Manyera	Ford Fiesta R5	4:52:48.2	+34:58.5	4	—
27	9	44	(Turkey) Erkan Güral	(Turkey) Burak Koçoğlu	(Turkey) BC Vision Motorsport	Škoda Fabia R5	5:00:10.5	+42:20.8	2	—
28	10	45	(Greece) George Vassilakis	(Greece) Spiros Koltsidas	(Greece) George Vassilakis	Ford Fiesta R5	5:43:24.5	+1:25:34.8	1	—
**World Rally Championship-3**
17	1	61	(Sweden) Emil Bergkvist	(Sweden) Patrik Barth	(Sweden) Emil Bergkvist	Ford Fiesta R2T	4:40:03.2	0.0	25	—
19	2	62	(Sweden) Denis Rådström	(Sweden) Johan Johansson	(Sweden) Denis Rådström	Ford Fiesta R2T	4:43:57.3	+3:54.1	18	—
20	3	72	(Chile) Emilio Fernández	(Chile) Joaquin Riquelme	(Chile) Emilio Fernández	Ford Fiesta R2T	4:48:01.6	+7:58.4	15	—
21	4	66	(Republic of Ireland) Callum Devine	(Republic of Ireland) Brian Hoy	(Republic of Ireland) Callum Devine	Ford Fiesta R2T	4:49:46.6	+9:43.4	12	—
24	5	68	(Turkey) Bugra Banaz	(Turkey) Burak Erdener	(Turkey) Castrol Ford Team Turkiye	Ford Fiesta R2T	4:54:54.9	+14:51.7	10	—
25	6	71	(United Kingdom) Tom Williams	(United Kingdom) Phil Hall	(United Kingdom) Tom Williams	Ford Fiesta R2T	4:57:59.4	+17:56.2	8	—
26	7	70	(New Zealand) David Holder	(New Zealand) Jason Farmer	(New Zealand) Holder Brothers Racing	Ford Fiesta R2T	4:58:26.2	+18:23.0	6	—
29	8	67	(Italy) Enrico Oldrati	(Italy) Danilo Fappani	(Italy) ACI Team Italia	Ford Fiesta R2T	5:45:25.8	+1:05:22.6	4	—
30	9	74	(United Kingdom) Louise Cook	(United Kingdom) Stefan Davis	(United Kingdom) Louise Cook	Ford Fiesta R2	5:51:10.9	+1:11:07.7	2	—
**Junior World Rally Championship**
17	1	61	(Sweden) Emil Bergkvist	(Sweden) Patrik Barth	(Sweden) Emil Bergkvist	Ford Fiesta R2T	4:40:03.2	0.0	50	**0**
19	2	62	(Sweden) Denis Rådström	(Sweden) Johan Johansson	(Sweden) Denis Rådström	Ford Fiesta R2T	4:43:57.3	+3:54.1	36	**0**
20	3	72	(Chile) Emilio Fernández	(Chile) Joaquin Riquelme	(Chile) Emilio Fernández	Ford Fiesta R2T	4:48:01.6	+7:58.4	30	**0**
21	4	66	(Republic of Ireland) Callum Devine	(Republic of Ireland) Brian Hoy	(Republic of Ireland) Callum Devine	Ford Fiesta R2T	4:49:46.6	+9:43.4	24	**2**
24	5	68	(Turkey) Bugra Banaz	(Turkey) Burak Erdener	(Turkey) Castrol Ford Team Turkiye	Ford Fiesta R2T	4:54:54.9	+14:51.7	20	**0**
25	6	71	(United Kingdom) Tom Williams	(United Kingdom) Phil Hall	(United Kingdom) Tom Williams	Ford Fiesta R2T	4:57:59.4	+17:56.2	16	**0**
26	7	70	(New Zealand) David Holder	(New Zealand) Jason Farmer	(New Zealand) Holder Brothers Racing	Ford Fiesta R2T	4:58:26.2	+18:23.0	12	**2**
29	8	67	(Italy) Enrico Oldrati	(Italy) Danilo Fappani	(Italy) ACI Team Italia	Ford Fiesta R2T	5:45:25.8	+1:05:22.6	8	**0**

=== Other notable finishers ===
The following notable crews finished the rally outside top ten.

Position		No.	Driver	Co-driver	Entrant	Car	Class	Time	Points
Event	Class	No.	Driver	Co-driver	Entrant	Car	Class	Time	Stage
12	12	2	(United Kingdom) Elfyn Evans	(United Kingdom) Daniel Barritt	(United Kingdom) M-Sport Ford WRT	Ford Fiesta WRC	WRC	4:21:33.5	**1**
15	15	12	(United Arab Emirates) Khalid Al-Qassimi	(United Kingdom) Chris Patterson	(France) Citroën Total Abu Dhabi WRT	Citroën C3 WRC	WRC	4:35:20.6	**0**
16	16	5	(Belgium) Thierry Neuville	(Belgium) Nicolas Gilsoul	(South Korea) Hyundai Shell Mobis WRT	Hyundai i20 Coupe WRC	WRC	4:38:11.0	**5**
23	23	10	(Norway) Mads Østberg	(Norway) Torstein Eriksen	(France) Citroën Total Abu Dhabi WRT	Citroën C3 WRC	WRC	4:54:00.6	**0**

=== Special stages ===
**Overall classification**
Day	Stage	Name	Length	Winner	Car	Time	Class leader
13 September	—	Asparan [Shakedown]	5.00 km	(Belgium) Thierry Neuville	Hyundai i20 Coupe WRC	3:24.9	—N/a
13 September	SS1	SSS Turkey	2.00 km	(Norway) Andreas Mikkelsen	Hyundai i20 Coupe WRC	2:03.9	(Norway) Andreas Mikkelsen
14 September	SS2	Çetibeli 1	38.10 km	(Republic of Ireland) Craig Breen	Citroën C3 WRC	28:32.3	(Republic of Ireland) Craig Breen
14 September	SS3	Ula 1	21.75 km	(Belgium) Thierry Neuville	Hyundai i20 Coupe WRC	16:14.8	(Republic of Ireland) Craig Breen
14 September	SS4	Çiçekli 1	12.57 km	(Norway) Andreas Mikkelsen	Hyundai i20 Coupe WRC	10:32.0	(Norway) Andreas Mikkelsen
14 September	SS5	Çetibeli 2	38.10 km	(France) Sébastien Ogier	Ford Fiesta WRC	27:54.8	(Norway) Andreas Mikkelsen
14 September	SS6	Ula 2	21.75 km	(Belgium) Thierry Neuville	Hyundai i20 Coupe WRC	15:59.7	(Norway) Andreas Mikkelsen
14 September	SS7	Çiçekli 2	12.57 km	(Estonia) Ott Tänak	Toyota Yaris WRC	10:22.3	(Belgium) Thierry Neuville
15 September	SS8	Yeşilbelde 1	34.24 km	(France) Sébastien Ogier	Ford Fiesta WRC	27:19.7	(France) Sébastien Ogier
15 September	SS9	Datça 1	10.70 km	(Norway) Andreas Mikkelsen	Hyundai i20 Coupe WRC	8:29.2	(France) Sébastien Ogier
15 September	SS10	İçmeler 1	20.37 km	(France) Sébastien Ogier	Ford Fiesta WRC	14:28.2	(Norway) Andreas Mikkelsen
15 September	SS11	Yeşilbelde 2	34.24 km	(Estonia) Ott Tänak	Toyota Yaris WRC	27:12.3	(Estonia) Ott Tänak
15 September	SS12	Datça 2	10.70 km	(Finland) Jari-Matti Latvala	Toyota Yaris WRC	8:33.9	(Estonia) Ott Tänak
15 September	SS13	İçmeler 2	20.37 km	(Estonia) Ott Tänak	Toyota Yaris WRC	14:37.5	(Estonia) Ott Tänak
16 September	SS14	Marmaris 1	7.14 km	(Belgium) Thierry Neuville	Hyundai i20 Coupe WRC	5:07.2	(Estonia) Ott Tänak
16 September	SS15	Ovacık	8.05 km	(France) Sébastien Ogier	Ford Fiesta WRC	6:22.8	(Estonia) Ott Tänak
16 September	SS16	Gökçe	12.65 km	(France) Sébastien Ogier	Ford Fiesta WRC	8:12.3	(Estonia) Ott Tänak
16 September	SS17	Marmaris 2 [Power stage]	7.14 km	(Belgium) Thierry Neuville	Hyundai i20 Coupe WRC	4:59.5	(Estonia) Ott Tänak
**World Rally Championship-2**
13 September	—	Asparan [Shakedown]	5.00 km	(Czech Republic) Jan Kopecký	Škoda Fabia R5	3:43.3	—N/a
13 September	SS1	SSS Turkey	2.00 km	(Poland) Kajetan Kajetanowicz	Ford Fiesta R5	2:07.0	(Poland) Kajetan Kajetanowicz
14 September	SS2	Çetibeli 1	38.10 km	(Czech Republic) Jan Kopecký	Škoda Fabia R5	30:16.8	(Czech Republic) Jan Kopecký
14 September	SS3	Ula 1	21.75 km	(Czech Republic) Jan Kopecký	Škoda Fabia R5	16:53.7	(Czech Republic) Jan Kopecký
14 September	SS4	Çiçekli 1	12.57 km	(Sweden) Pontus Tidemand	Škoda Fabia R5	10:51.1	(Czech Republic) Jan Kopecký
14 September	SS5	Çetibeli 2	38.10 km	(Chile) Pedro Heller	Ford Fiesta R5	31:40.9	(United Kingdom) Chris Ingram
14 September	SS6	Ula 2	21.75 km	(Czech Republic) Jan Kopecký	Škoda Fabia R5	17:27.6	(United Kingdom) Chris Ingram
14 September	SS7	Çiçekli 2	12.57 km	(Czech Republic) Jan Kopecký	Škoda Fabia R5	11:05.0	(Czech Republic) Jan Kopecký
15 September	SS8	Yeşilbelde 1	34.24 km	(Poland) Kajetan Kajetanowicz	Ford Fiesta R5	28:50.6	(Czech Republic) Jan Kopecký
15 September	SS9	Datça 1	10.70 km	(Poland) Kajetan Kajetanowicz	Ford Fiesta R5	8:51.9	(Czech Republic) Jan Kopecký
15 September	SS10	İçmeler 1	20.37 km	(Poland) Kajetan Kajetanowicz	Ford Fiesta R5	15:14.3	(United Kingdom) Chris Ingram
15 September	SS11	Yeşilbelde 2	34.24 km	(Poland) Kajetan Kajetanowicz	Ford Fiesta R5	28:26.1	(United Kingdom) Chris Ingram
15 September	SS12	Datça 2	10.70 km	(Romania) Simone Tempestini	Citroën C3 R5	8:56.3	(United Kingdom) Chris Ingram
15 September	SS13	İçmeler 2	20.37 km	(Czech Republic) Jan Kopecký	Škoda Fabia R5	15:14.0	(Czech Republic) Jan Kopecký
16 September	SS14	Marmaris 1	7.14 km	(Poland) Kajetan Kajetanowicz	Ford Fiesta R5	5:24.1	(Czech Republic) Jan Kopecký
16 September	SS15	Ovacık	8.05 km	(Poland) Kajetan Kajetanowicz	Ford Fiesta R5	6:37.9	(Czech Republic) Jan Kopecký
16 September	SS16	Gökçe	12.65 km	(Poland) Kajetan Kajetanowicz	Ford Fiesta R5	8:41.3	(Czech Republic) Jan Kopecký
16 September	SS17	Marmaris 2	7.14 km	(Poland) Kajetan Kajetanowicz	Ford Fiesta R5	5:18.4	(Czech Republic) Jan Kopecký
**World Rally Championship-3** / **Junior World Rally Championship**
13 September	—	Asparan [Shakedown]	5.00 km	(Germany) Julius Tannert	Ford Fiesta R2T	4:13.1	—N/a
13 September	SS1	SSS Turkey	2.00 km	(France) Jean-Baptiste Franceschi	Ford Fiesta R2T	2:21.7	(France) Jean-Baptiste Franceschi
14 September	SS2	Çetibeli 1	38.10 km	(Germany) Julius Tannert	Ford Fiesta R2T	32:50.6	(Germany) Julius Tannert
14 September	SS3	Ula 1	21.75 km	(France) Jean-Baptiste Franceschi	Ford Fiesta R2T	18:41.5	(Germany) Julius Tannert
14 September	SS4	Çiçekli 1	12.57 km	(Estonia) Ken Torn	Ford Fiesta R2T	11:49.8	(Germany) Julius Tannert
14 September	SS5	Çetibeli 2	38.10 km	(Republic of Ireland) Callum Devine	Ford Fiesta R2T	33:26.8	(Germany) Julius Tannert
14 September	SS6	Ula 2	21.75 km	(Estonia) Ken Torn	Ford Fiesta R2T	18:58.3	(Germany) Julius Tannert
14 September	SS7	Çiçekli 2	12.57 km	(Estonia) Ken Torn	Ford Fiesta R2T	11:48.0	(Germany) Julius Tannert
15 September	SS8	Yeşilbelde 1	34.24 km	(Germany) Julius Tannert	Ford Fiesta R2T	31:08.8	(Germany) Julius Tannert
15 September	SS9	Datça 1	10.70 km	(France) Jean-Baptiste Franceschi	Ford Fiesta R2T	9:48.9	(Germany) Julius Tannert
15 September	SS10	İçmeler 1	20.37 km	(France) Jean-Baptiste Franceschi	Ford Fiesta R2T	16:31.9	(Estonia) Ken Torn
15 September	SS11	Yeşilbelde 2	34.24 km	**Stage interrupted**			
15 September	SS12	Datça 2	10.70 km	(France) Jean-Baptiste Franceschi	Ford Fiesta R2T	10:02.0	(Estonia) Ken Torn
15 September	SS13	İçmeler 2	20.37 km	(Republic of Ireland) Callum Devine	Ford Fiesta R2T	16:44.8	(Estonia) Ken Torn
16 September	SS14	Marmaris 1	7.14 km	(France) Jean-Baptiste Franceschi	Ford Fiesta R2T	5:56.4	(Estonia) Ken Torn
16 September	SS15	Ovacık	8.05 km	(France) Jean-Baptiste Franceschi	Ford Fiesta R2T	7:10.2	(Sweden) Emil Bergkvist
16 September	SS16	Gökçe	12.65 km	(New Zealand) David Holder	Ford Fiesta R2T	9:33.2	(Sweden) Emil Bergkvist
16 September	SS17	Marmaris 2	7.14 km	(New Zealand) David Holder	Ford Fiesta R2T	6:02.0	(Sweden) Emil Bergkvist

=== Power stage ===
The Power stage was a 7.14 km stage at the end of the rally. Additional World Championship points were awarded to the five fastest crews.

Pos.	Driver	Co-driver	Car	Time	Diff.	Pts.
1	(Belgium) Thierry Neuville	(Belgium) Nicolas Gilsoul	Hyundai i20 Coupe WRC	4:59.5	0.0	**5**
2	(France) Sébastien Ogier	(France) Julien Ingrassia	Ford Fiesta WRC	5:01.2	+1.6	**4**
3	(Estonia) Ott Tänak	(Estonia) Martin Järveoja	Toyota Yaris WRC	5:03.4	+3.8	**3**
4	(Finland) Jari-Matti Latvala	(Finland) Miikka Anttila	Toyota Yaris WRC	5:06.0	+6.4	**2**
5	(United Kingdom) Elfyn Evans	(United Kingdom) Daniel Barritt	Ford Fiesta WRC	5:07.5	+8.0	**1**

=== J-WRC stage winning crews ===
Junior World Rally Championship crews scored additional points. Each of the fastest stage time was awarded with one bonus point.

Pos.	Driver	Co-driver	Car	Pts.
1	(France) Jean-Baptiste Franceschi	(France) Romain Courbon	Ford Fiesta R2T	**7**
2	(Estonia) Ken Torn	(Estonia) Kuldar Sikk	Ford Fiesta R2T	**3**
3	(Germany) Julius Tannert	(Austria) Jürgen Heigl	Ford Fiesta R2T	**2**
3	(Republic of Ireland) Callum Devine	(Republic of Ireland) Brian Hoy	Ford Fiesta R2T	**2**
3	(New Zealand) David Holder	(New Zealand) Jason Farmer	Ford Fiesta R2T	**2**

=== Penalties ===
The following notable crews were given time penalty during the rally.

Stage	No.	Driver	Co-driver	Entrant	Car	Class	Reason	Penalty
SS3	45	(Greece) George Vassilakis	(Greece) Spiros Koltsidas	(Greece) George Vassilakis	Ford Fiesta R5	WRC-2	2 minutes late	0:20
SS4	45	(Greece) George Vassilakis	(Greece) Spiros Koltsidas	(Greece) George Vassilakis	Ford Fiesta R5	WRC-2	1 minute early	1:00
SS4	62	(Sweden) Denis Rådström	(Sweden) Johan Johansson	(Sweden) Denis Rådström	Ford Fiesta R2T	WRC-3, JWRC	1 minute late	0:10
SS7	31	(Sweden) Pontus Tidemand	(Sweden) Jonas Andersson	(Czech Republic) Škoda Motorsport II	Škoda Fabia R5	WRC-2	2 minutes late	0:20
SS7	35	(Portugal) Diogo Salvi	(Portugal) Hugo Magalhães	(Italy) Motorsport Italia	Škoda Fabia R5	WRC-2	14 minutes late	2:20
SS8	38	(Turkey) Murat Bostanci	(Turkey) Onur Vatansever	(Turkey) Castrol Ford Team Türkiye	Ford Fiesta R5	WRC-2	3 minutes late	0:30
SS8	39	(United Kingdom) Chris Ingram	(United Kingdom) Ross Whittock	(Turkey) Toksport WRT	Škoda Fabia R5	WRC-2	1 minute late	0:10
SS8	39	(United Kingdom) Chris Ingram	(United Kingdom) Ross Whittock	(Turkey) Toksport WRT	Škoda Fabia R5	WRC-2	1 minute early	1:00
SS8	45	(Greece) George Vassilakis	(Greece) Spiros Koltsidas	(Greece) George Vassilakis	Ford Fiesta R5	WRC-2	Jump start	0:10
SS10	1	(France) Sébastien Ogier	(France) Julien Ingrassia	(United Kingdom) M-Sport Ford WRT	Ford Fiesta WRC	WRC	6 minutes late	1:00
SS10	2	(United Kingdom) Elfyn Evans	(United Kingdom) Daniel Barritt	(United Kingdom) M-Sport Ford WRT	Ford Fiesta WRC	WRC	1 minute late	0:10
SS10	66	(Republic of Ireland) Callum Devine	(Republic of Ireland) Brian Hoy	(Republic of Ireland) Callum Devine	Ford Fiesta R2T	WRC-3, JWRC	1 minute late	0:10
SS12	4	(Norway) Andreas Mikkelsen	(Norway) Anders Jæger-Synnevaag	(South Korea) Hyundai Shell Mobis WRT	Hyundai i20 Coupe WRC	WRC	20 minutes late	3:20
SS13	37	(Romania) Simone Tempestini	(Romania) Sergio Itu	(Romania) Simone Tempestini	Citroën C3 R5	WRC-2	2 minutes late	0:20
SS16	2	(United Kingdom) Elfyn Evans	(United Kingdom) Daniel Barritt	(United Kingdom) M-Sport Ford WRT	Ford Fiesta WRC	WRC	5 minutes early	5:00
SS16	64	(Estonia) Ken Torn	(Estonia) Kuldar Sikk	(Estonia) OT Racing	Ford Fiesta R2T	WRC-3, JWRC	14 minutes late	2:20
SS16	45	(Greece) George Vassilakis	(Greece) Spiros Koltsidas	(Greece) George Vassilakis	Ford Fiesta R5	WRC-2	Jump start	1:00

=== Retirements ===
The following notable crews retired from the event. Under Rally2 regulations, they were eligible to re-enter the event starting from the next leg. Crews that re-entered were given an additional time penalty.

Stage	No.	Driver	Co-driver	Entrant	Car	Class	Cause	Re-entry
SS2	33	(United Kingdom) Gus Greensmith	(United States) Alessandro Gelsomino	(United Kingdom) Gus Greensmith	Ford Fiesta R5	WRC-2	Off road	Yes
SS2	38	(Turkey) Murat Bostanci	(Turkey) Onur Vatansever	(Turkey) Castrol Ford Team Türkiye	Ford Fiesta R5	WRC-2	Mechanical	Yes
SS2	74	(United Kingdom) Louise Cook	(United Kingdom) Stefan Davis	(United Kingdom) Louise Cook	Ford Fiesta R2	WRC-3	Mechanical	Yes
SS5	12	(United Arab Emirates) Khalid Al-Qassimi	(United Kingdom) Chris Patterson	(France) Citroën Total Abu Dhabi WRT	Citroën C3 WRC	WRC	Mechanical	Yes
SS5	63	(France) Jean-Baptiste Franceschi	(France) Romain Courbon	Équipe de France FFSA Rally	Ford Fiesta R2T	WRC-3, JWRC	Mechanical	Yes
SS5	67	(Italy) Enrico Oldrati	(Italy) Danilo Fappani	(Italy) ACI Team Italia	Ford Fiesta R2T	WRC-3, JWRC	Mechanical	Yes
SS5	70	(New Zealand) David Holder	(New Zealand) Jason Farmer	(New Zealand) Holder Brothers Racing	Ford Fiesta R2T	WRC-3, JWRC	Mechanical	Yes
SS6	2	(United Kingdom) Elfyn Evans	(United Kingdom) Daniel Barritt	(United Kingdom) M-Sport Ford WRT	Ford Fiesta WRC	WRC	Suspension	Yes
SS6	10	(Norway) Mads Østberg	(Norway) Torstein Eriksen	(France) Citroën Total Abu Dhabi WRT	Citroën C3 WRC	WRC	Suspension	Yes
SS6	21	(Saudi Arabia) Yazeed Al-Rajhi	(United Kingdom) Michael Orr	(Saudi Arabia) Yazeed Racing	Ford Fiesta RS WRC	WRC	Mechanical	Yes
SS7	42	(Turkey) Deniz Fahri	(Turkey) Bahadir Gücenmez	Ford Motorsport Turkey	Ford Fiesta R5	WRC-2	Mechanical	No
SS7	31	(Sweden) Pontus Tidemand	(Sweden) Jonas Andersson	(Czech Republic) Škoda Motorsport II	Škoda Fabia R5	WRC-2	Punctures	No
SS7	66	(Republic of Ireland) Callum Devine	(Republic of Ireland) Brian Hoy	(Republic of Ireland) Callum Devine	Ford Fiesta R2T	WRC-3, JWRC	Mechanical	Yes
SS8	5	(Belgium) Thierry Neuville	(Belgium) Nicolas Gilsoul	(South Korea) Hyundai Shell Mobis WRT	Hyundai i20 Coupe WRC	WRC	Suspension	Yes
SS8	10	(Norway) Mads Østberg	(Norway) Torstein Eriksen	(France) Citroën Total Abu Dhabi WRT	Citroën C3 WRC	WRC	Turbo	Yes
SS8	40	(Turkey) Yağız Avci	(Turkey) Ersan Alkir	Ford Motorsport Turkey	Ford Fiesta R5	WRC-2	Mechanical	Yes
SS8	67	(Italy) Enrico Oldrati	(Italy) Danilo Fappani	(Italy) ACI Team Italia	Ford Fiesta R2T	WRC-3, JWRC	Mechanical	Yes
SS10	9	(Finland) Esapekka Lappi	(Finland) Janne Ferm	(Japan) Toyota Gazoo Racing WRT	Toyota Yaris WRC	WRC	Off road	No
SS10	38	(Turkey) Murat Bostanci	(Turkey) Onur Vatansever	(Turkey) Castrol Ford Team Türkiye	Ford Fiesta R5	WRC-2	Mechanical	Yes
SS10	45	(Greece) George Vassilakis	(Greece) Spiros Koltsidas	(Greece) George Vassilakis	Ford Fiesta R5	WRC-2	Mechanical	Yes
SS11	1	(France) Sébastien Ogier	(France) Julien Ingrassia	(United Kingdom) M-Sport Ford WRT	Ford Fiesta WRC	WRC	Off road	Yes
SS11	21	(Saudi Arabia) Yazeed Al-Rajhi	(United Kingdom) Michael Orr	(Saudi Arabia) Yazeed Racing	Ford Fiesta RS WRC	WRC	Fire	No
SS12	11	(Republic of Ireland) Craig Breen	(United Kingdom) Scott Martin	(France) Citroën Total Abu Dhabi WRT	Citroën C3 WRC	WRC	Fire	No
SS12	65	(Germany) Julius Tannert	(Austria) Jürgen Heigl	(Germany) ADAC Sachsen	Ford Fiesta R2T	WRC-3, JWRC	Mechanical	Yes
SS12	73	(Romania) Raul Badiu	(Romania) Gabriel Lazar	(Romania) Raul Badiu	Ford Fiesta R2T	WRC-3, JWRC	Mechanical	Yes
SS14	38	(Turkey) Murat Bostanci	(Turkey) Onur Vatansever	(Turkey) Castrol Ford Team Türkiye	Ford Fiesta R5	WRC-2	Mechanical	No
SS15	65	(Germany) Julius Tannert	(Austria) Jürgen Heigl	(Germany) ADAC Sachsen	Ford Fiesta R2T	WRC-3, JWRC	Mechanical	No
SS15	73	(Romania) Raul Badiu	(Romania) Gabriel Lazar	(Romania) Raul Badiu	Ford Fiesta R2T	WRC-3, JWRC	Mechanical	No
SS16	33	(United Kingdom) Gus Greensmith	(United States) Alessandro Gelsomino	(United Kingdom) Gus Greensmith	Ford Fiesta R5	WRC-2	Mechanical	No
SS16	63	(France) Jean-Baptiste Franceschi	(France) Romain Courbon	Équipe de France FFSA Rally	Ford Fiesta R2T	WRC-3, JWRC	Off road	No
SS17	64	(Estonia) Ken Torn	(Estonia) Kuldar Sikk	(Estonia) OT Racing	Ford Fiesta R2T	WRC-3, JWRC	Accident damage	No

=== Championship standings after the rally ===
- **Bold text** indicates 2018 World Champions.

==== Drivers' championships ====
**World Rally Championship**
	Pos.	Driver	Points
	1	(Belgium) Thierry Neuville	177
1	2	(Estonia) Ott Tänak	164
1	3	(France) Sébastien Ogier	154
	4	(Finland) Esapekka Lappi	88
2	5	(Finland) Jari-Matti Latvala	75
**World Rally Championship-2**
	Pos.	Driver	Points
	1	(Czech Republic) Jan Kopecký	125
	2	(Sweden) Pontus Tidemand	93
	3	(United Kingdom) Gus Greensmith	55
	4	(Poland) Łukasz Pieniążek	48
	5	(Italy) Fabio Andolfi	46
**World Rally Championship-3**
	Pos.	Driver	Points
3	1	(Sweden) Emil Bergkvist	86
1	2	(Sweden) Denis Rådström	80
2	3	(France) Jean-Baptiste Franceschi	79
2	4	(Finland) Taisko Lario	68
	5	(Italy) Enrico Brazzoli	55
**Junior World Rally Championship**
	Pos.	Driver	Points
	1	**(Sweden) Emil Bergkvist**	138
	2	(Sweden) Denis Rådström	110
	3	(France) Jean-Baptiste Franceschi	69
3	4	(Republic of Ireland) Callum Devine	54
1	5	(Estonia) Ken Torn	52

==== Co-Drivers' championships ====
**World Rally Championship**
	Pos.	Co-Driver	Points
	1	(Belgium) Nicolas Gilsoul	177
1	2	(Estonia) Martin Järveoja	164
1	3	(France) Julien Ingrassia	154
	4	(Finland) Janne Ferm	88
1	5	(Finland) Miikka Anttila	75
**World Rally Championship-2**
	Pos.	Co-Driver	Points
	1	(Czech Republic) Pavel Dresler	125
	2	(Sweden) Jonas Andersson	93
	3	(United Kingdom) Craig Parry	55
	4	(Poland) Przemysław Mazur	48
	5	(Norway) Stig Rune Skjærmoen	45
**World Rally Championship-3**
	Pos.	Co-Driver	Points
2	1	(Sweden) Johan Johansson	80
1	2	(France) Romain Courbon	79
1	3	(Finland) Tatu Hämäläinen	68
	4	(Italy) Luca Beltrame	55
	5	(Norway) Ola Fløene	33
**Junior World Rally Championship**
	Pos.	Co-Driver	Points
	1	**(Sweden) Johan Johansson**	110
	2	(France) Romain Courbon	69
	3	(Sweden) Joakim Sjöberg	50
	4	(Estonia) Kuldar Sikk	44
4	5	(Turkey) Burak Erdener	42

==== Manufacturers' and teams' championships ====
**World Rally Championship**
	Pos.	Manufacturer	Points
1	1	(Japan) Toyota Gazoo Racing WRT	284
1	2	(South Korea) Hyundai Shell Mobis WRT	279
	3	(United Kingdom) M-Sport Ford WRT	244
	4	(France) Citroën Total Abu Dhabi WRT	169
**World Rally Championship-2**
	Pos.	Team	Points
1	1	(Czech Republic) Škoda Motorsport II	125
1	2	(Czech Republic) Škoda Motorsport	108
	3	(Finland) Printsport	69
	4	(Italy) ACI Team Italia WRC	62
	5	(South Korea) Hyundai Motorsport	54
**World Rally Championship-3**
	Pos.	Team	Points
	1	(Italy) ACI Team Italia	83
3	2	(Turkey) Castrol Ford Team Turkiye	67
1	3	(Estonia) OT Racing	62
1	4	(Germany) ADAC Sachsen	62
1	5	Équipe de France FFSA Rally	55

== Notes ==
Previous rally: 2018 Rallye Deutschland	2018 FIA World Rally Championship	Next rally: 2018 Wales Rally GB
Previous rally: 2010 Rally Turkey	2018 Rally Turkey	Next rally: 2019 Rally Turkey
