= Benjamin Veillas =

French rally co-driver (born 1978)

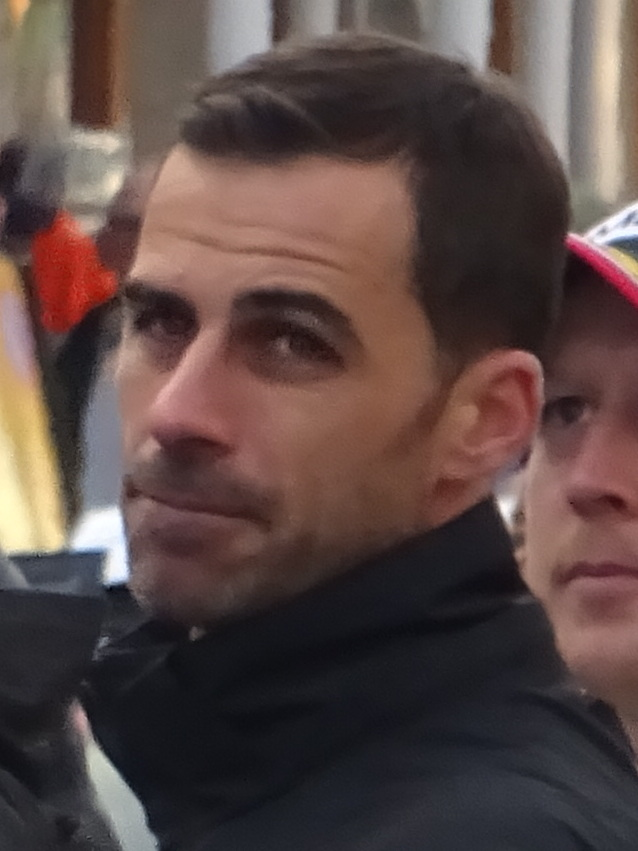
- Veillas at the 2017 Wales Rally GB

Personal information
- Nationality: (France) French
- Born: February 26, 1978 (age 48)

World Rally Championship record
- Years active: 1999, 2008, 2015–2019, 2021–present
- Driver: (France) Franck Lions (France) Franck Doveri (France) Eric Camilli (France) Julien Maurin (France) Sébastien Ogier (France) Pierre-Louis Loubet
- Teams: Toyota Gazoo Racing WRT
- Rallies: 47
- Championships: 0
- Rally wins: 1
- Podiums: 3
- Stage wins: 22
- First rally: 1999 Tour de Corse
- First win: 2022 Rally Catalunya
- Last win: 2022 Rally Catalunya
- Last rally: 2023 Central Europe Rally

Benjamin Veillas (born 26 February 1978) is a French rally co-driver competing with Pierre-Louis Loubet for M-Sport WRT in the FIA World Rally Championship.

== Biography ==
Veillas started his co-driver career in 1997, and made his World Rally Championship debut in 1999. He was the co-driver of Eric Camilli, and once competed for M-Sport World Rally Team in 2016. He was announced to be the co-driver of multiple world champion Sébastien Ogier in 2022, following the retirement of Julien Ingrassia. They are set to contest selected events for Toyota Gazoo Racing WRT.

At the 2022 Monte Carlo Rally, the French pair finished second overall, after they got a puncture in the penultimate stage.

== WRC victories ==
#	Event	Season	Driver	Car
1	(Spain) 2022 Rally Catalunya	2022	(France) Sébastien Ogier	Toyota GR Yaris Rally1

== Rally results ==
=== WRC results ===
Year	Entrant	Car	1	2	3	4	5	6	7	8	9	10	11	12	13	14	15	WDC	Points
1999	Franck Lions	Renault Clio Williams	MON	SWE	KEN	POR	ESP	FRA; Ret	ARG	GRE	NZL	FIN	CHN	ITA	AUS	GBR		NC	0
2008	Franck Doveri	Mitsubishi Lancer Evo VIII	MON; Ret	SWE	MEX	ARG	JOR	ITA	GRE	TUR	FIN	GER	NZL	ESP	FRA	JPN	GBR	NC	0
2015	Team Oreca	Ford Fiesta R5	MON; 15	SWE	MEX	ARG	POR; Ret	ITA; 16	POL	FIN; 52	GER; 14	AUS	FRA; 16	ESP; Ret	GBR; 12			NC	0
2016	Julien Maurin	Škoda Fabia R5	MON; Ret	SWE														11th	28
2016	M-Sport World Rally Team	Ford Fiesta RS WRC			MEX; 16	ARG; 8	POR; 5	ITA; 6	POL; 10	FIN; Ret	GER; 50	CHN; C	FRA; 8	ESP; 19	GBR; 10	AUS; Ret		11th	28
2017	M-Sport World Rally Team	Ford Fiesta R5	MON; 12	SWE; 14	MEX; 11	FRA; 28	ARG	POR; 21	ITA; 9	POL; 14	FIN; 12	GER; 10	ESP; 16	GBR; 12	AUS			21st	3
2018	M-Sport Ford WRT	Ford Fiesta R5	MON; Ret	SWE	MEX	FRA	ARG	POR	ITA	FIN	GER; Ret	TUR	GBR; 24					NC	0
2018	Volkswagen Motorsport	Volkswagen Polo GTI R5												ESP; 35	AUS			NC	0
2019	M-Sport Ford WRT	Ford Fiesta R5 Mk. II	MON	SWE	MEX	FRA	ARG	CHL	POR	ITA	FIN; 13	GER; 15	TUR	GBR				28th	1
2019	Eric Camilli	Citroën C3 R5													ESP; 10	AUS; C		28th	1
2021	Sports and You	Citroën C3 Rally2	MON	ARC	CRO	POR; 39	ITA	KEN	EST	BEL	GRE	FIN	ESP	MNZ				NC	0
2022	Toyota Gazoo Racing WRT	Toyota GR Yaris Rally1	MON; 2	SWE	CRO	POR; 51	ITA	KEN; 4	EST	FIN	BEL	GRE	NZL; 2	ESP; 1	JPN; WD			6th	85
2023	M-Sport Ford WRT	Ford Puma Rally1	MON	SWE	MEX	CRO	POR	ITA	KEN	EST	FIN	GRE	CHL	EUR; 10	JAP			27th*	1*

* Season still in progress.
