= 2017 Junior WRC Championship =

The 2017 FIA Junior WRC Championship was the fifth season of Junior WRC, a rallying championship governed by the Fédération Internationale de l'Automobile, running in support of the World Rally Championship.

The championship was open to drivers born after 1 January 1988, although no such restriction existed for co-drivers. They competed in identical one-litre Ford Fiesta R2s built and maintained by M-Sport, with DMACK tyres. Crews were also eligible to score points in WRC3. The championship was competed over six European WRC rounds. Nil Solans was crowned champion at the end of the season.

== Calendar ==
The final 2017 Junior WRC Championship calendar consisted of six European events, taken from the 2017 World Rally Championship.

Round	Dates		Rally name	Rally headquarters	Rally details		
Round	Start	Finish	Rally name	Rally headquarters	Surface	Stages	Distance
1	7 April	9 April	(France) Tour de Corse	Bastia, Haute-Corse	Tarmac	10	316.76 km
2	9 June	11 June	(Italy) Rally Italia Sardegna	Alghero, Sardinia	Gravel	19	312.66 km
3	30 June	2 July	Rally Poland	Mikołajki, Warmia-Masuria	Gravel	23	318.47 km
4	28 July	30 July	Rally Finland	Jyväskylä, Keski-Suomi	Gravel	25	314.20 km
5	18 August	20 August	(Germany) Rallye Deutschland	Trier, Rhineland-Palatinate	Tarmac	21	309.17 km
6	6 October	8 October	(Spain) Rally Catalunya	Salou, Tarragona	Mixed	19	312.02 km

== Entries ==
The following crews competed in the championship.

Drivers	Co-drivers	Rounds
(Bolivia) Sebastian Careaga	(Argentina) Claudio Bustos	1
(Bolivia) Sebastian Careaga	(Spain) Rodrigo Sanjuan	2–3
(France) Nicolas Ciamin	(France) Thibault de la Haye	1–6
(Republic of Ireland) Robert Duggan	(Republic of Ireland) Gerard Conway	1
(Republic of Ireland) Robert Duggan	(United Kingdom) Tom Woodburn	2
(France) Terry Folb	(France) Christopher Guieu	1–6
(Finland) Emil Lindholm	(Finland) Tomi Tuominen	3–4
(Estonia) Miko-Ove Niinemaë	(Estonia) Martin Valter	1–2
(Sweden) Dennis Rådström	(Sweden) Johan Johansson	1–4, 6
(Spain) Nil Solans	(Spain) Miquel Ibáñez	1–6
(Germany) Julius Tannert	(Austria) Jürgen Heigl	1–6
(Belgium) William Wagner	(France) Kévin Parent	1
(United States) Dillon van Way	(United Kingdom) Dai Roberts	1–4

== Regulation changes ==
The series will change from using Citroën DS3 R3Ts with Michelin tyres, to use Ford Fiesta R2 prepared by M-Sport with DMACK tyres.

The championship will also adopt the prize format of the Drive DMACK Fiesta Trophy in which the season will be divided into "stages" and a prize awarded to the top-placed driver in each stage (contrary to the previous Junior WRC Championship, in which there was only one prize). The driver with most points after the first two rallies will be awarded two drives in the 2018 WRC2 in a Ford Fiesta R5. The driver with most points scored in the second pair of rallies will win an equal prize, as will the top-placed driver in the third pair of rallies. Additionally, an extra prize drive will be awarded to the overall winner of the category.

== Season report ==
The season started with the Tour de Corse where Nil Solans won the event from start to finish. After building a lead of more than 40 seconds in the first Leg, he managed he was chased by local Terry Folb, until a driveshaft problem made him lost his second place to fellow Frenchman Nicolas Ciamin.

== Results and standings ==
=== Season summary ===
Round	Event name	Winning driver	Winning co-driver	Winning time	Report
1	(France) Tour de Corse	(Spain) Nil Solans	(Spain) Miquel Ibáñez	3:53:44.4	Report
2	(Italy) Rally Italia Sardegna	(Spain) Nil Solans	(Spain) Miquel Ibáñez	4:00:07.8	Report
3	Rally Poland	(Spain) Nil Solans	(Spain) Miquel Ibáñez	3:17:47.0	Report
4	Rally Finland	(France) Nicolas Ciamin	(France) Thibault de la Haye	2:57:23.4	Report
5	(Germany) Rallye Deutschland	(Germany) Julius Tannert	(Austria) Jürgen Heigl	3:30:54.4	Report
6	(Spain) Rally Catalunya	(Spain) Nil Solans	(Spain) Miquel Ibáñez	3:29:02.3	Report

=== Scoring system ===
Points are awarded to the top ten classified finishers. An additional point is given for every stage win. The best 5 classification results count towards the drivers’ and co-drivers’ totals, but stage points from all 6 rounds can be retained.

Position	1st	2nd	3rd	4th	5th	6th	7th	8th	9th	10th
Points	25	18	15	12	10	8	6	4	2	1

=== FIA Junior WRC Championship for Drivers ===
Pos.	Driver	FRA (France)	ITA (Italy)	POL (Poland)	FIN (Finland)	GER (Germany)	ESP (Spain)	Drops	Points
1	(Spain) Nil Solans	1^{+4}	1^{+8}	1^{+9}	2^{+5}	2^{+4}	1^{+10}	18	158
2	(France) Nicolas Ciamin	2^{+2}	2^{+4}	3	1^{+11}	3^{+10}	5^{+7}	10	125
3	(France) Terry Folb	3^{+4}	4^{+2}	4^{+5}	Ret^{+4}	4^{+7}	2^{+1}	0	92
4	(Germany) Julius Tannert	4	3	5	4^{+1}	1	3	10	80
5	(Sweden) Dennis Rådström	5	5^{+1}	2^{+6}	3^{+4}		4^{+1}	0	77
6	(United States) Dillon Van Way	8	7	6	5	WD		0	28
7	(Republic of Ireland) Robert Duggan	6	6^{+4}	WD				0	20
8	(Bolivia) Sebastian Careaga	7	8	7	WD	WD		0	16
9	(Finland) Emil Lindholm			8^{+1}	Ret^{+1}			0	6
10	(Estonia) Miko-Ove Niinemäe	9	Ret	WD				0	2
Pos.	Driver	FRA (France)	ITA (Italy)	POL (Poland)	FIN (Finland)	GER (Germany)	ESP (Spain)	Drops	Points

Key
Colour	Result
Gold	Winner
Silver	2nd place
Bronze	3rd place
Green	Points finish
Blue	Non-points finish
Blue	Non-classified finish (NC)
Purple	Did not finish (Ret)
Black	Excluded (EX)
Black	Disqualified (DSQ)
White	Did not start (DNS)
White	Cancelled (C)
Blank	Withdrew entry from the event (WD)

=== FIA Junior WRC Championship for Co-Drivers ===
Pos.	Co-driver	FRA (France)	ITA (Italy)	POL (Poland)	FIN (Finland)	GER (Germany)	ESP (Spain)	Drops	Points
1	(Spain) Miquel Ibáñez	1^{+4}	1^{+8}	1^{+9}	2^{+5}	2^{+4}	1^{+10}	18	158
2	(France) Thibault de la Haye	2^{+2}	2^{+4}	3	1^{+11}	3^{+10}	5^{+7}	10	125
3	(France) Christopher Guieu	3^{+4}	4^{+2}	4^{+5}	Ret^{+4}	4^{+7}	2^{+1}	0	92
4	(Austria) Jürgen Heigl	4	3	5	4^{+1}	1	3	10	80
5	(Sweden) Johan Johansson	5	5^{+1}	2^{+6}	3^{+4}		4^{+1}	0	77
6	(United Kingdom) Dai Roberts	8	7	6	5	WD		0	28
7	(United Kingdom) Tom Woodburn		6^{+4}	WD				0	12
8	(Spain) Rodrigo Sanjuan		8	7	WD	WD		0	10
9	(Republic of Ireland) Gerard Conway	6						0	8
10	(Argentina) Claudio Bustos	7						0	6
11	(Finland) Tomi Tuominen			8^{+1}	Ret^{+1}			0	6
12	(Estonia) Martin Valter	9	Ret	WD				0	2
Pos.	Co-driver	FRA (France)	ITA (Italy)	POL (Poland)	FIN (Finland)	GER (Germany)	ESP (Spain)	Drops	Points

Key
Colour	Result
Gold	Winner
Silver	2nd place
Bronze	3rd place
Green	Points finish
Blue	Non-points finish
Blue	Non-classified finish (NC)
Purple	Did not finish (Ret)
Black	Excluded (EX)
Black	Disqualified (DSQ)
White	Did not start (DNS)
White	Cancelled (C)
Blank	Withdrew entry from the event (WD)

=== FIA Junior WRC Championship for Nations ===
Pos.	Country	FRA (France)	ITA (Italy)	POL (Poland)	FIN (Finland)	GER (Germany)	ESP (Spain)	Points
1	Spain							136
2	France							109
3	Germany							94
4	Sweden							69
5	United States							34
6	Bolivia							22
7	Ireland							20
8	Finland							6
9	Estonia							4
Pos.	Co-driver	FRA (France)	ITA (Italy)	POL (Poland)	FIN (Finland)	GER (Germany)	ESP (Spain)	Points
