= Emil Lindholm =

Finnish rally driver (born 1996)

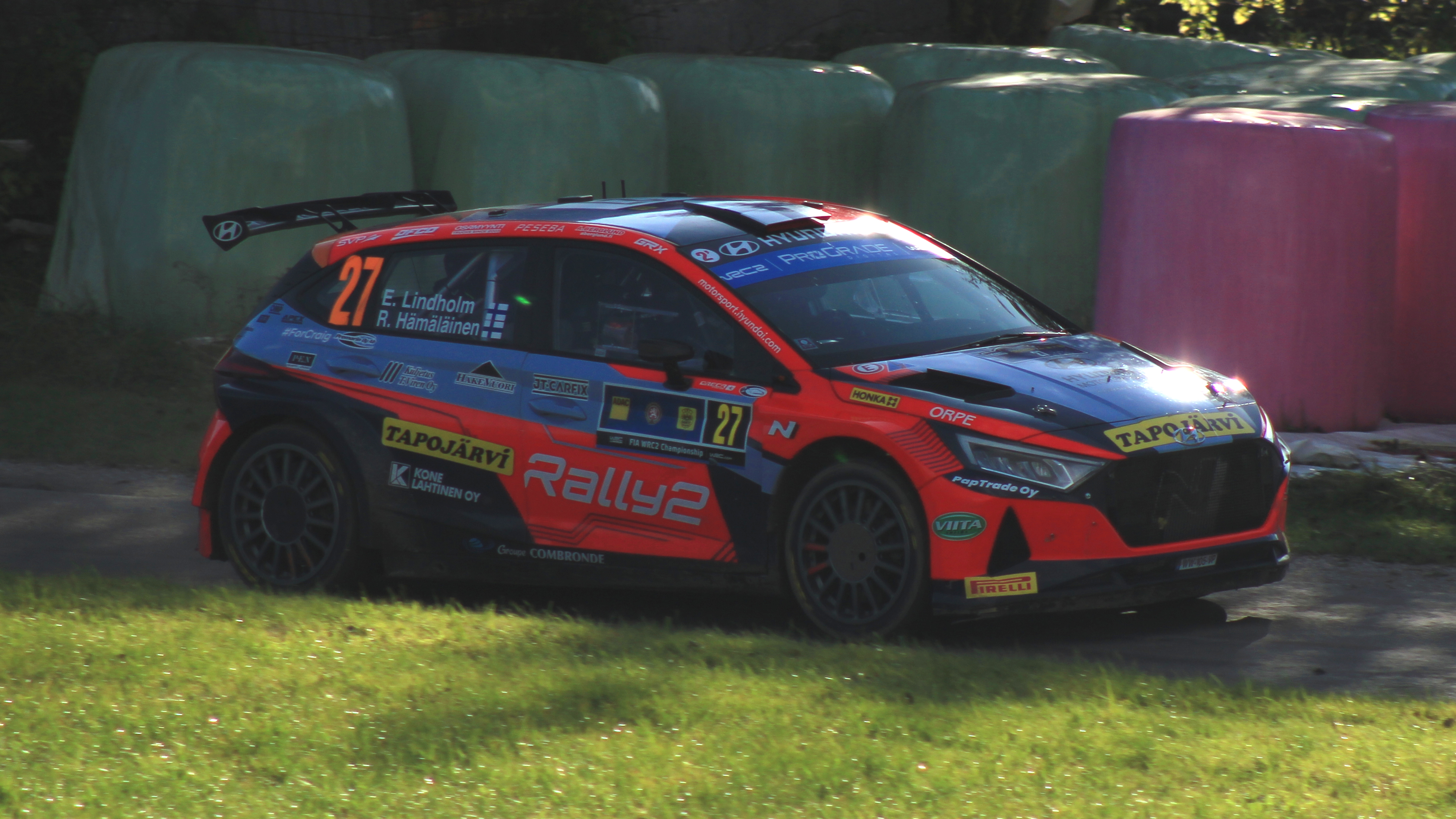
- Lindholm during the 2023 Central European Rally
- Nationality: (Finland) Finnish
- Born: Emil Sebastian Lindholm; 19 July 1996 (age 30) Helsinki, Finland
- Relatives: Sebastian Lindholm (father)
Emil Lindholm
World Rally Championship record
- Years active: 2017–present
- Co-driver: (Finland) Reeta Hämäläinen (Brazil) Gabriel Morales
- Teams: Toksport, Hyundai
- Rallies: 42
- Championships: 0
- Rally wins: 0
- Podiums: 0
- Stage wins: 0
- Total points: 24
- First rally: 2017 Rally Poland
- Last rally: 2026 Croatia Rally

Emil Sebastian Lindholm (born 19 July 1996) is a Finnish rally driver. He is the son of former World Rally Championship driver Sebastian Lindholm. He won the World Rally Championship-2 title in 2022 and the Finnish Rally Championship in 2021.

== Rally results ==
=== WRC results ===
Year	Entrant	Car	1	2	3	4	5	6	7	8	9	10	11	12	13	14	Pos.	Points
2017	Emil Lindholm	Ford Fiesta R2T	MON	SWE	MEX	FRA	ARG	POR	ITA	POL; 35	FIN; Ret	GER	ESP	GBR	AUS		NC	0
2018	Printsport	Škoda Fabia R5	MON	SWE	MEX	FRA	ARG	POR	ITA	FIN; 40	GER	TUR	GBR	ESP	AUS		NC	0
2019	Emil Lindholm	Volkswagen Polo GTI R5	MON	SWE; 12	MEX	FRA	ARG	CHL	POR	ITA	FIN; 43	GER	TUR	GBR	ESP; 13	AUS; C	NC	0
2020	Emil Lindholm	Škoda Fabia R5 evo	MON	SWE; 11	MEX	EST	TUR	ITA	MNZ; 11								NC	0
2021	Emil Lindholm	Škoda Fabia Rally2 evo	MON	ARC; Ret	CRO; 13	POR; 27	ITA; Ret	KEN	EST; Ret	BEL	GRE; 14	FIN; 10	ESP; 12	MNZ			32nd	1
2022	Toksport WRT 2	Škoda Fabia Rally2 evo	MON	SWE; 32	CRO; 9	POR	ITA	KEN	EST; 10	FIN; 8	BEL	GRE; 7	NZL	ESP; 14			15th	16
2022	Toksport WRT	Škoda Fabia Rally2 evo													JPN; 9		15th	16
2023	Toksport WRT	Škoda Fabia RS Rally2	MON	SWE; 16		CRO; 11	POR	ITA; Ret	KEN								21st	6
2023	Toksport WRT 2	Škoda Fabia Rally2 evo			MEX; 7												21st	6
2023	Hyundai Motorsport N	Hyundai i20 N Rally2								EST; 11	FIN; 20	GRE	CHL; Ret	EUR; Ret	JPN		21st	6
2024	Emil Lindholm	Hyundai i20 N Rally2	MON	SWE; 12	KEN	CRO; 18	POR	ITA; 46	POL	LAT; Ret	FIN; 55	GRE	CHL	EUR	JPN		NC	0
2025	Toksport WRT	Škoda Fabia RS Rally2	MON	SWE	KEN	ESP; 14	POR	ITA; Ret	GRE; 13	EST	FIN; 15	PAR	CHL; Ret	EUR	JPN	SAU	NC	0
2026	Toksport WRT	Škoda Fabia RS Rally2	MON	SWE	KEN	CRO; 10	ESP; 17	POR	JPN; 13	GRE	EST; 13	FIN; Ret	PAR	CHL	ITA; 24	SAU; C	32nd	1

* Season still in progress.

=== WRC-2 results ===
Year	Entrant	Car	1	2	3	4	5	6	7	8	9	10	11	12	13	14	Pos.	Points
2018	Printsport	Škoda Fabia R5	MON	SWE	MEX	FRA	ARG	POR	ITA	FIN; 11	GER	TUR	GBR	ESP	AUS		NC	0
2019	Emil Lindholm	Volkswagen Polo GTI R5	MON	SWE; 2	MEX	FRA	ARG	CHL	POR	ITA	FIN; 7	GER	TUR	GBR	ESP; 2	AUS; C	10th	42
2022	Toksport WRT 2	Škoda Fabia Rally2 evo	MON	SWE; 14	CRO; 3	POR	ITA	KEN	EST; 3	FIN; 1	BEL	GRE; 1	NZL	ESP; 4			1st	116
2022	Toksport WRT	Škoda Fabia Rally2 evo													JPN; 3		1st	116
2023	Toksport WRT	Škoda Fabia RS Rally2	MON	SWE; 7		CRO; 3	POR	ITA; Ret	KEN								9th	62
2023	Toksport WRT 2	Škoda Fabia Rally2 evo			MEX; 2												9th	62
2023	Hyundai Motorsport N	Hyundai i20 N Rally2								EST; 3	FIN; 13	GRE	CHL; Ret	EUR; Ret	JPN		9th	62
2024	Emil Lindholm	Hyundai i20 N Rally2	MON	SWE; 7	KEN	CRO; 8	POR	ITA; 24	POL	LAT; Ret	FIN; 20	GRE	CHL	EUR	JPN		29th	10
2025	Toksport WRT	Škoda Fabia RS Rally2	MON	SWE	KEN	ESP; 6	POR	ITA; Ret	GRE; 7	EST	FIN; 4	PAR	CHL; Ret	EUR	JPN	SAU	17th	26
2026	Toksport WRT	Škoda Fabia RS Rally2	MON	SWE	KEN	CRO; 7	ESP; 8	POR	JPN; 4	GRE	EST; 4	FIN; Ret	PAR	CHL	ITA; 13	SAU; C	14th	34

* Season still in progress.

=== WRC-3 results ===
Year	Entrant	Car	1	2	3	4	5	6	7	8	9	10	11	12	13	Pos.	Points
2017	Emil Lindholm	Ford Fiesta R2T	MON	SWE	MEX	FRA	ARG	POR	ITA	POL; 10	FIN; Ret	GER	ESP	GBR	AUS	16th	1
2020	Emil Lindholm	Škoda Fabia R5 evo	MON	SWE; 2	MEX	EST	TUR	ITA	MNZ; 4							5th	30
2021	Emil Lindholm	Škoda Fabia Rally2 evo	MON	ARC; Ret	CRO; 2	POR; 10	ITA; Ret	KEN	EST; Ret	BEL	GRE; 3	FIN; 1	ESP; 1 (Note: Emil Lindholm competed as the driver, but was identified as the co-driver on official documents. Therefore the points achieved by Lindholm are counted in the 2021 WRC-3 Co-drivers' standings.)	MNZ		3rd	73

=== JWRC results ===
Year	Entrant	Car	1	2	3	4	5	6	Pos.	Points
2017	Emil Lindholm	Ford Fiesta R2T	FRA	ITA	POL; 10	FIN; Ret	GER	ESP	16th	1

=== ERC results ===
Year	Entrant	Car	1	2	3	4	5	Pos.	Points
2020	Team MRF Tyres	Škoda Fabia R5 evo	ITA; 9	LAT; 5	PRT; Ret	HUN; 19	ESP	15th	27
