= 2022 Rally Catalunya (World Rally Championship) =

57th edition of Rally de Catalunya

2022 Rally Catalunya RallyRACC Catalunya - Costa Daurada 2022
Round 12 of 13 in the 2022 World Rally Championship
← Previous event	Next event →
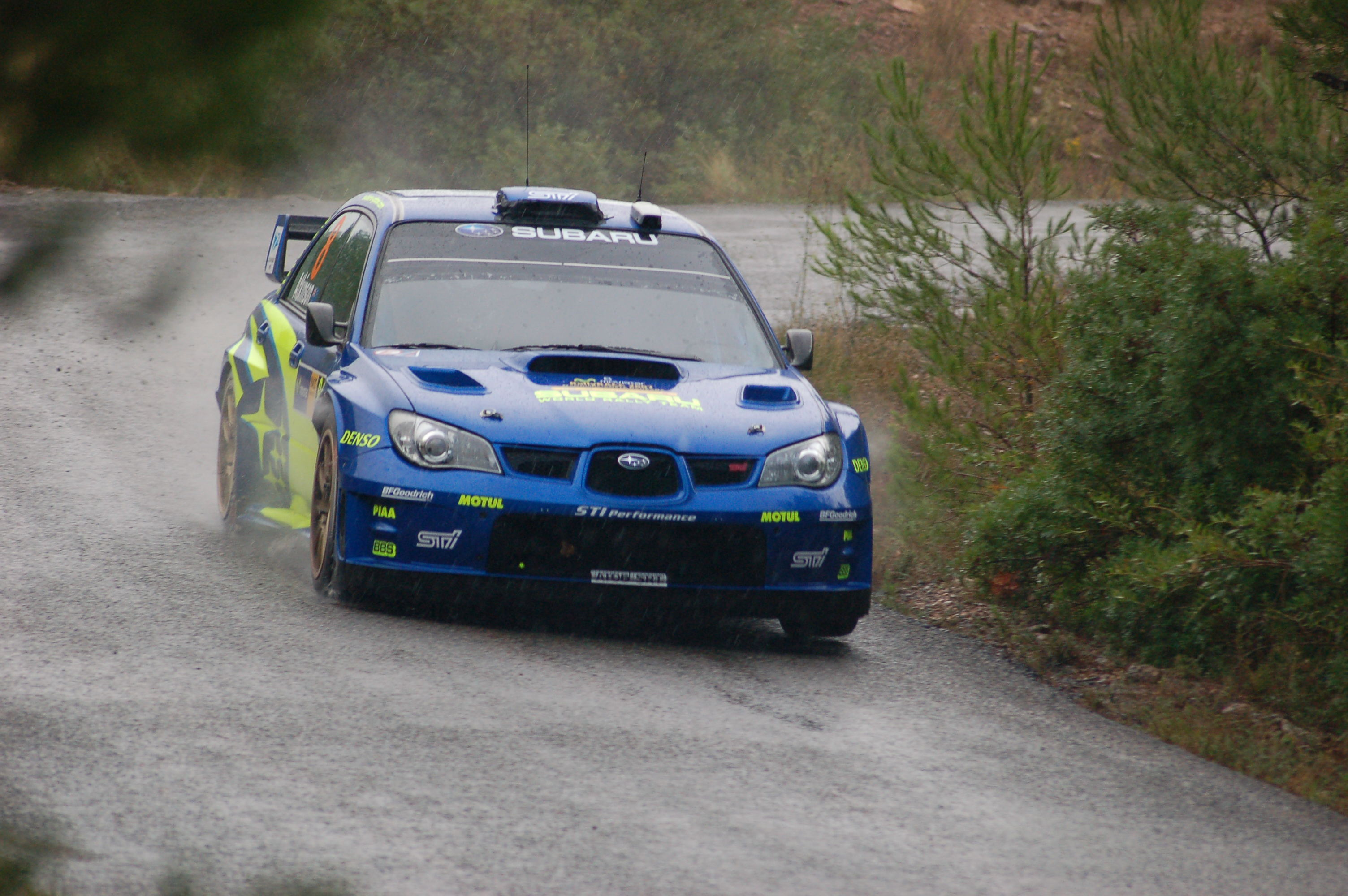
- The rally featured fast and smooth circuit-like asphalt.
- Host country: Spain
- Rally base: Salou, Catalonia
- Dates run: 20 – 23 October 2022
- Start location: Lleida, Catalonia
- Finish location: Riudecanyes, Catalonia
- Stages: 19 (293.77 km; 182.54 miles)
- Stage surface: Tarmac
- Transport distance: 1,086.20 km (674.93 miles)
- Overall distance: 1,379.97 km (857.47 miles)

Statistics
- Crews registered: 67
- Crews: 64 at start, 57 at finish

Overall results
- Overall winner: (France) Sébastien Ogier (France) Benjamin Veillas (Japan) Toyota Gazoo Racing WRT; 2:44:43.9
- Power Stage winner: (France) Sébastien Ogier (France) Benjamin Veillas (Japan) Toyota Gazoo Racing WRT; 10:06.4

Support category results
- WRC-2 winner: (Finland) Teemu Suninen (Finland) Mikko Markkula (South Korea) Hyundai Motorsport N 2:54:29.6
- WRC-3 winner: (Finland) Lauri Joona (Finland) Mikael Korhonen; 3:04:36.1

The 2022 Rally Catalunya (also known as the RallyRACC Catalunya - Costa Daurada 2022) was a motor racing event for rally cars that was held over four days between 20 and 23 October 2022. It marked the fifty-seventh running of the Rally de Catalunya. The event was the twelfth round of the 2022 World Rally Championship, World Rally Championship-2 and World Rally Championship-3. The 2022 event was based in Salou in the province of Tarragona in Catalonia and was contested over nineteen special stages covering a total competitive distance of 293.77 km (182.54 mi).

Thierry Neuville and Martijn Wydaeghe were the defending rally winners. Their team, Hyundai Shell Mobis WRT, were the defending manufacturers' winners. Eric Camilli and Maxime Vilmot were the defending winners in the WRC-2 category. Emil Lindholm and Reeta Hämäläinen were the defending winners in the WRC-3 category.

Sébastien Ogier and Benjamin Veillas won their first rally of the season. Their team, Toyota Gazoo Racing WRT, won the 2022 manufacturers' title. Teemu Suninen and Mikko Markkula won the World Rally Championship-2 category. Lauri Joona and Mikael Korhonen won the World Rally Championship-3 category, and with the victory, Joona became the 2022 WRC-3 champion.

== Background ==
=== Entry list ===
The following crews entered into the rally. The event was opened to crews competing in the World Rally Championship, its support categories, the World Rally Championship-2 and World Rally Championship-3, and privateer entries that were not registered to score points in any championship, as well as the European Rally championship and its support categories. Twelve entered under Rally1 regulations, as were thirty-three Rally2 crews in the World Rally Championship-2 and four Rally3 crews in the World Rally Championship-3.

Rally1 entries competing in the World Rally Championship
No.	Driver	Co-Driver	Entrant	Car	Championship eligibility	Tyre
1	(France) Sébastien Ogier	(France) Benjamin Veillas	(Japan) Toyota Gazoo Racing WRT	Toyota GR Yaris Rally1	Driver, Co-driver, Manufacturer	P
6	(Spain) Dani Sordo	(Spain) Cándido Carrera	(South Korea) Hyundai Shell Mobis WRT	Hyundai i20 N Rally1	Driver, Co-driver, Manufacturer	P
7	(France) Pierre-Louis Loubet	(France) Vincent Landais	(United Kingdom) M-Sport Ford WRT	Ford Puma Rally1	Driver, Co-driver	P
8	(Estonia) Ott Tänak	(Estonia) Martin Järveoja	(South Korea) Hyundai Shell Mobis WRT	Hyundai i20 N Rally1	Driver, Co-driver, Manufacturer	P
9	(Greece) Jourdan Serderidis	(Belgium) Frédéric Miclotte	(United Kingdom) M-Sport Ford WRT	Ford Puma Rally1	Driver, Co-driver	P
11	(Belgium) Thierry Neuville	(Belgium) Martijn Wydaeghe	(South Korea) Hyundai Shell Mobis WRT	Hyundai i20 N Rally1	Driver, Co-driver, Manufacturer	P
16	(France) Adrien Fourmaux	(France) Alexandre Coria	(United Kingdom) M-Sport Ford WRT	Ford Puma Rally1	Driver, Co-driver, Manufacturer	P
18	(Japan) Takamoto Katsuta	(Republic of Ireland) Aaron Johnston	(Japan) Toyota Gazoo Racing WRT NG	Toyota GR Yaris Rally1	Driver, Co-driver, Manufacturer/Team	P
33	(United Kingdom) Elfyn Evans	(United Kingdom) Scott Martin	(Japan) Toyota Gazoo Racing WRT	Toyota GR Yaris Rally1	Driver, Co-driver, Manufacturer	P
42	(Republic of Ireland) Craig Breen	(Republic of Ireland) Paul Nagle	(United Kingdom) M-Sport Ford WRT	Ford Puma Rally1	Driver, Co-driver, Manufacturer	P
44	(United Kingdom) Gus Greensmith	(Sweden) Jonas Andersson	(United Kingdom) M-Sport Ford WRT	Ford Puma Rally1	Driver, Co-driver, Manufacturer	P
69	(Finland) Kalle Rovanperä	(Finland) Jonne Halttunen	(Japan) Toyota Gazoo Racing WRT	Toyota GR Yaris Rally1	Driver, Co-driver, Manufacturer	P

Rally2 entries competing in the World Rally Championship-2
No.	Driver	Co-Driver	Entrant	Car	Championship eligibility	Tyre
20	(France) Yohan Rossel	(France) Arnaud Dunand	(France) PH Sport	Citroën C3 Rally2	Driver, Co-driver	P
21	(Finland) Teemu Suninen	(Finland) Mikko Markkula	(South Korea) Hyundai Motorsport N	Hyundai i20 N Rally2	Driver, Co-driver, Team	P
22	(Finland) Emil Lindholm	(Finland) Reeta Hämäläinen	(Germany) Toksport WRT 2	Škoda Fabia Rally2 evo	Junior Driver, Co-driver, Team	P
23	(Poland) Kajetan Kajetanowicz	(Poland) Maciej Szczepaniak	(Poland) Kajetan Kajetanowicz	Škoda Fabia Rally2 evo	Driver, Co-driver	P
24	Nikolay Gryazin (Note: Nikolay Gryazin is Russian, but he competes as a neutral competitor using the ANA flag as Russian national emblems were banned by the association due to the Russian invasion of Ukraine.)	Konstantin Aleksandrov (Note: Konstantin Aleksandrov is Russian, but he competes as a neutral competitor using the ANA flag as Russian national emblems were banned by the association due to the Russian invasion of Ukraine.)	(Germany) Toksport WRT 2	Škoda Fabia Rally2 evo	Junior Driver, Co-driver, Team	P
25	(Finland) Jari Huttunen	(Finland) Mikko Lukka	(United Kingdom) M-Sport Ford WRT	Ford Fiesta Rally2	Driver, Co-driver, Team	P
26	(Spain) Pepe López	(Spain) Borja Rozada	(Spain) Pepe López	Hyundai i20 N Rally2	Junior Driver, Co-driver	P
27	(Spain) Nil Solans	(Spain) Axel Coronado Jiménez	(Spain) Nil Solans	Hyundai i20 N Rally2	Junior Driver, Co-driver	P
28	(Spain) Jan Solans	(Spain) Rodrigo Sanjuan de Eusebio	(Spain) Jan Solans	Citroën C3 Rally2	Junior Driver, Co-driver	P
29	(Spain) Alejandro Cachón	(Spain) Alejandro López Fernández	(Spain) Alejandro Cachón	Citroën C3 Rally2	Junior Driver, Junior Co-driver	P
30	(Bolivia) Bruno Bulacia	(Spain) Carlos del Barrio	(Bolivia) Bruno Bulacia	Škoda Fabia Rally2 evo	Junior Driver, Co-driver	P
31	(Republic of Ireland) Josh McErlean	(Republic of Ireland) James Fulton	(Republic of Ireland) Josh McErlean	Hyundai i20 N Rally2	Junior Driver, Junior Co-driver	P
32	(Estonia) Georg Linnamäe	(United Kingdom) James Morgan	(Estonia) ALM Motorsport	Volkswagen Polo GTI R5	Junior Driver, Co-driver	P
34	(Finland) Sami Pajari	(Finland) Enni Mälkönen	(Finland) Sami Pajari	Škoda Fabia Rally2 evo	Junior Driver, Co-driver	P
35	(France) Stéphane Sarrazin	(France) Jacques-Julien Renucci	(France) Stéphane Sarrazin	Volkswagen Polo GTI R5	Driver, Co-driver	P
36	(Spain) Eduard Pons Suñe	(Spain) Alberto Chamorro	(Spain) Eduard Pons Suñe	Škoda Fabia Rally2 evo	Masters Driver, Co-driver	P
37	(Luxembourg) Grégoire Munster	(Belgium) Louis Louka	(Luxembourg) Grégoire Munster	Hyundai i20 N Rally2	Junior Driver, Junior Co-driver	P
38	(Austria) Johannes Keferböck	(Austria) Ilka Minor	(Austria) Johannes Keferböck	Škoda Fabia Rally2 evo	Driver, Co-driver	P
39	(Poland) Mikołaj Marczyk	(Poland) Szymon Gospodarczyk	(Poland) Mikołaj Marczyk	Škoda Fabia Rally2 evo	Junior Driver, Co-driver	P
40	(Finland) Mikko Heikkilä	(Finland) Samu Vaaleri	(Finland) Mikko Heikkilä	Škoda Fabia Rally2 evo	Junior Driver, Junior Co-driver	P
41	(Paraguay) Fabrizio Zaldivar	(Italy) Marcelo Der Ohannesian	(South Korea) Hyundai Motorsport N	Hyundai i20 N Rally2	Junior Driver, Team	P
43	(Poland) Daniel Chwist	(Poland) Kamil Heller	(Poland) Daniel Chwist	Škoda Fabia Rally2 evo	Driver, Co-driver	P
45	(Germany) Armin Kremer	(Germany) Ella Kremer	(Germany) Armin Kremer	Škoda Fabia Rally2 evo	Masters Driver, Co-driver	P
46	(Italy) Mauro Miele	(Italy) Luca Beltrame	(Italy) Mauro Miele	Škoda Fabia Rally2 evo	Masters Driver, Co-driver	P
47	(France) Jean-Michel Raoux	(France) Laurent Magat	(France) Jean-Michel Raoux	Volkswagen Polo GTI R5	Masters Driver, Masters Co-driver	P
48	(Republic of Ireland) Eamonn Boland	(Republic of Ireland) Michael Joseph Morrissey	(Republic of Ireland) Eamonn Boland	Ford Fiesta Rally2	Masters Driver, Masters Co-driver	P
49	(Italy) Fabrizio Arengi	(Italy) Massimiliano Bosi	(Italy) Fabrizio Arengi	Škoda Fabia Rally2 evo	Masters Driver, Co-driver	P
50	(France) Patrick Déjean	(France) Yannick Jammes	(France) Patrick Déjean	Citroën C3 Rally2	Driver, Co-driver	P
51	(Saudi Arabia) Rakan Al-Rashed	(Portugal) Hugo Magalhães	(Saudi Arabia) Rakan Al-Rashed	Volkswagen Polo GTI R5	Driver, Co-driver	P
52	(Australia) Luke Anear	(United Kingdom) Allan Harryman	(United Kingdom) M-Sport Ford WRT	Ford Fiesta Rally2	Driver, Co-driver, Team	P
54	(Netherlands) Henk Vossen	(Netherlands) Radboud van Hoek	(Netherlands) Henk Vossen	Ford Fiesta R5	Masters Driver, Masters Co-driver	P
55	(Italy) Filippo Marchino	(Italy) Pietro Elia Ometto	(Italy) Filippo Marchino	Škoda Fabia R5	Driver, Co-driver	P
56	(Spain) Miguel Díaz-Aboitiz	(Spain) Jordi Hereu	(Spain) Miguel Díaz-Aboitiz	Škoda Fabia Rally2 evo	Masters Driver, Co-driver	P

Rally3 entries competing in the World Rally Championship-3
No.	Driver	Co-Driver	Entrant	Car	Championship eligibility	Tyre
57	(Czech Republic) Jan Černý	(Czech Republic) Petr Černohorský	(Czech Republic) Jan Černý	Ford Fiesta Rally3	Open	P
58	(Paraguay) Diego Dominguez Jr.	(Spain) Rogelio Peñate	(Paraguay) Diego Dominguez Jr.	Ford Fiesta Rally3	Open	P
59	(Finland) Lauri Joona	(Finland) Mikael Korhonen	(Finland) Lauri Joona	Ford Fiesta Rally3	Open	P
60	(Hungary) Zoltán László	(Hungary) Tamás Kürti	(Hungary) Zoltán László	Ford Fiesta Rally3	Open	P

=== Itinerary ===
All dates and times are CEST (UTC+2).

Date	Time	No.	Stage name	Distance
20 October	9:01	—	Coll de la Teixeta [Shakedown]	4.21 km
21 October	8:33	SS1	Els Omells — Maldà 1	11.05 km
21 October	9:33	SS2	Serra de la Llena 1	11.79 km
21 October	10:26	SS3	Les Garrigues Altes 1	22.64 km
21 October	11:26	SS4	Riba-roja 1	13.98 km
21 October	15:09	SS5	Els Omells — Maldà 2	11.05 km
21 October	16:09	SS6	Serra de la Llena 2	11.79 km
21 October	17:02	SS7	Les Garrigues Altes 2	22.64 km
21 October	18:02	SS8	Riba-roja 2	13.98 km
22 October	8:44	SS9	Savallà 1	13.93 km
22 October	9:37	SS10	Querol — Les Pobles 1	20.19 km
22 October	10:38	SS11	El Montmell 1	24.18 km
22 October	14:14	SS12	Savallà 2	13.93 km
22 October	15:07	SS13	Querol — Les Pobles 2	20.19 km
22 October	16:08	SS14	El Montmell 2	24.18 km
22 October	18:40	SS15	Salou	2.24 km
23 October	7:00	SS16	Pratdip 1	12.15 km
23 October	8:08	SS17	Riudecanyes 1	15.90 km
23 October	10:29	SS18	Pratdip 2	12.15 km
23 October	12:18	SS19	Riudecanyes 2 [Power Stage]	15.90 km

== Report ==
=== WRC Rally1 ===
==== Classification ====
Position		No.	Driver	Co-driver	Entrant	Car	Time	Difference	Points	
Event	Class	No.	Driver	Co-driver	Entrant	Car	Time	Difference	Event	Stage
1	1	1	Sébastien Ogier	Benjamin Veillas	Toyota Gazoo Racing WRT	Toyota GR Yaris Rally1	2:44:43.9	0.0	25	5
2	2	11	Thierry Neuville	Martijn Wydaeghe	Hyundai Shell Mobis WRT	Hyundai i20 N Rally1	2:45:00.3	+16.4	18	4
3	3	69	Kalle Rovanperä	Jonne Halttunen	Toyota Gazoo Racing WRT	Toyota GR Yaris Rally1	2:45:18.4	+34.5	15	3
4	4	8	Ott Tänak	Martin Järveoja	Hyundai Shell Mobis WRT	Hyundai i20 N Rally1	2:45:27.9	+44.0	12	2
5	5	6	Dani Sordo	Cándido Carrera	Hyundai Shell Mobis WRT	Hyundai i20 N Rally1	2:46:05.4	+1:21.5	10	1
6	6	33	Elfyn Evans	Scott Martin	Toyota Gazoo Racing WRT	Toyota GR Yaris Rally1	2:46:35.0	+1:51.1	8	0
7	7	18	Takamoto Katsuta	Aaron Johnston	Toyota Gazoo Racing WRT NG	Toyota GR Yaris Rally1	2:47:03.0	+2:19.1	6	0
8	8	16	Adrien Fourmaux	Alexandre Coria	M-Sport Ford WRT	Ford Puma Rally1	2:47:22.3	+2:38.4	4	0
9	9	42	Craig Breen	Paul Nagle	M-Sport Ford WRT	Ford Puma Rally1	2:47:26.9	+2:43.0	2	0
10	10	7	Pierre-Louis Loubet	Vincent Landais	M-Sport Ford WRT	Ford Puma Rally1	2:48:09.0	+3:25.1	1	0
28	11	9	Jourdan Serderidis	Frédéric Miclotte	M-Sport Ford WRT	Ford Puma Rally1	3:02:38.2	+17:54.3	0	0
Retired SS19		44	Gus Greensmith	Jonas Andersson	M-Sport Ford WRT	Ford Puma Rally1	Withdrawn		0	0

==== Special stages ====
Stage	Winners	Car	Time	Class leaders
SD	Ogier / Veillas	Toyota GR Yaris Rally1	2:40.1	—N/a
SS1	Rovanperä / Halttunen	Toyota GR Yaris Rally1	5:16.1	Rovanperä / Halttunen
SS2	Rovanperä / Halttunen	Toyota GR Yaris Rally1	6:41.0	Rovanperä / Halttunen
SS3	Ogier / Veillas	Toyota GR Yaris Rally1	12:31.9	Ogier / Veillas
SS4	Neuville / Wydaeghe	Hyundai i20 N Rally1	8:41.0	Neuville / Wydaeghe
SS5	Ogier / Veillas	Toyota GR Yaris Rally1	5:08.8	Ogier / Veillas
SS6	Rovanperä / Halttunen	Toyota GR Yaris Rally1	6:47.2	Ogier / Veillas
SS7	Rovanperä / Halttunen	Toyota GR Yaris Rally1	12:10.9	Ogier / Veillas
SS8	Ogier / Veillas	Toyota GR Yaris Rally1	8:41.0	Ogier / Veillas
SS9	Neuville / Wydaeghe	Hyundai i20 N Rally1	7:21.7	Ogier / Veillas
SS10	Ogier / Veillas	Toyota GR Yaris Rally1	11:13.9	Ogier / Veillas
SS11	Stage interrupted			
SS12	Ogier / Veillas	Toyota GR Yaris Rally1	7:23.7	Ogier / Veillas
SS13	Ogier / Veillas	Toyota GR Yaris Rally1	11:14.7	Ogier / Veillas
SS14	Sordo / Carrera	Hyundai i20 N Rally1	12:06.1	Ogier / Veillas
SS15	Tänak / Järveoja; Neuville / Wydaeghe	Hyundai i20 N Rally1; Hyundai i20 N Rally1	2:27.1	Ogier / Veillas
SS16	Sordo / Carrera	Hyundai i20 N Rally1	7:04.8	Ogier / Veillas
SS17	Neuville / Wydaeghe	Hyundai i20 N Rally1	10:06.6	Ogier / Veillas
SS18	Ogier / Veillas	Toyota GR Yaris Rally1	7:00.7	Ogier / Veillas
SS19	Ogier / Veillas	Toyota GR Yaris Rally1	10:06.4	Ogier / Veillas

==== Championship standings ====
- **Bold text** indicates 2022 World Champions.

Pos.	Drivers' championships			Co-drivers' championships			Manufacturers' championships		
Pos.	Move	Driver	Points	Move	Co-driver	Points	Move	Manufacturer	Points
1		**Kalle Rovanperä**	255		**Jonne Halttunen**	255		**Toyota Gazoo Racing WRT**	503
2		Ott Tänak	187		Martin Järveoja	187		Hyundai Shell Mobis WRT	410
3		Thierry Neuville	166		Martijn Wydaeghe	166		M-Sport Ford WRT	238
4		Elfyn Evans	124		Scott Martin	124		Toyota Gazoo Racing WRT NG	123
5		Takamoto Katsuta	107		Aaron Johnston	107			

=== WRC-2 Rally2 ===
==== Classification ====
Position		No.	Driver	Co-driver	Entrant	Car	Time	Difference	Points		
Event	Class	No.	Driver	Co-driver	Entrant	Car	Time	Difference	Class	Stage	Event
11	1	21	Teemu Suninen	Mikko Markkula	Hyundai Motorsport N	Hyundai i20 N Rally2	2:54:29.6	0.0	25	0	0
12	2	20	Yohan Rossel	Arnaud Dunand	PH Sport	Citroën C3 Rally2	2:55:02.1	+32.5	18	0	0
13	3	24	Nikolay Gryazin	Konstantin Aleksandrov	Toksport WRT 2	Škoda Fabia Rally2 evo	2:55:22.9	+53.3	15	0	0
14	4	22	Emil Lindholm	Reeta Hämäläinen	Toksport WRT 2	Škoda Fabia Rally2 evo	2:56:02.2	+1:32.6	12	3	0
15	5	25	Jari Huttunen	Mikko Lukka	M-Sport Ford WRT	Ford Fiesta Rally2	2:56:26.7	+1:57.1	10	0	0
16	6	23	Kajetan Kajetanowicz	Maciej Szczepaniak	Kajetan Kajetanowicz	Škoda Fabia Rally2 evo	2:56:40.1	+2:10.5	8	0	0
17	7	34	Sami Pajari	Enni Mälkönen	Sami Pajari	Škoda Fabia Rally2 evo	2:57:22.2	+2:52.6	6	0	0
18	8	41	Fabrizio Zaldivar	Marcelo Der Ohannesian	Hyundai Motorsport N	Hyundai i20 N Rally2	2:57:54.1	+3:24.5	4	0	0
19	9	28	Jan Solans	Rodrigo Sanjuan de Eusebio	Jan Solans	Citroën C3 Rally2	2:58:00.2	+3:30.6	2	0	0
20	10	39	Mikołaj Marczyk	Szymon Gospodarczyk	Mikołaj Marczyk	Škoda Fabia Rally2 evo	2:58:18.6	+3:49.0	1	0	0
21	11	31	Josh McErlean	James Fulton	Josh McErlean	Hyundai i20 N Rally2	2:58:20.0	+3:50.4	0	0	0
22	12	37	Grégoire Munster	Louis Louka	Grégoire Munster	Hyundai i20 N Rally2	2:58:22.7	+3:53.1	0	0	0
23	13	32	Georg Linnamäe	James Morgan	ALM Motorsport	Volkswagen Polo GTI R5	2:58:29.4	+3:59.8	0	0	0
24	14	40	Mikko Heikkilä	Samu Vaaleri	Mikko Heikkilä	Škoda Fabia Rally2 evo	2:59:34.1	+5:04.5	0	0	0
25	15	26	Pepe López	Borja Rozada	Pepe López	Hyundai i20 N Rally2	3:00:17.8	+5:48.2	0	2	0
26	16	45	Armin Kremer	Ella Kremer	Armin Kremer	Škoda Fabia Rally2 evo	3:00:52.7	+6:23.1	0	0	0
27	17	46	Mauro Miele	Luca Beltrame	Mauro Miele	Škoda Fabia Rally2 evo	3:02:36.5	+8:06.9	0	0	0
32	18	38	Johannes Keferböck	Ilka Minor	Johannes Keferböck	Škoda Fabia Rally2 evo	3:04:50.5	+10:20.9	0	0	0
34	19	47	Jean-Michel Raoux	Laurent Magat	Jean-Michel Raoux	Volkswagen Polo GTI R5	3:07:15.8	+12:46.2	0	0	0
35	20	36	Eduard Pons Suñe	Alberto Chamorro	Eduard Pons Suñe	Škoda Fabia Rally2 evo	3:07:40.7	+13:11.1	0	0	0
36	21	30	Bruno Bulacia	Carlos del Barrio	Bruno Bulacia	Škoda Fabia Rally2 evo	3:08:04.4	+13:34.8	0	0	0
38	22	43	Daniel Chwist	Kamil Heller	Daniel Chwist	Škoda Fabia Rally2 evo	3:11:01.9	+16:32.3	0	0	0
44	23	48	Eamonn Boland	Michael Joseph Morrissey	Eamonn Boland	Ford Fiesta Rally2	3:14:08.2	+19:38.6	0	0	0
44	24	29	Alejandro Cachón	Alejandro López Fernández	Alejandro Cachón	Citroën C3 Rally2	3:15:43.0	+21:13.4	0	1	0
46	25	49	Fabrizio Arengi	Massimiliano Bosi	Fabrizio Arengi	Škoda Fabia Rally2 evo	3:18:35.0	+24:05.4	0	0	0
47	26	52	Luke Anear	Allan Harryman	M-Sport Ford WRT	Ford Fiesta Rally2	3:18:47.7	+24:18.1	0	0	0
45	27	56	Miguel Díaz-Aboitiz	Jordi Hereu	Miguel Díaz-Aboitiz	Škoda Fabia Rally2 evo	3:21:47.7	+27:18.1	0	0	0
55	28	54	Henk Vossen	Radboud van Hoek	Henk Vossen	Ford Fiesta R5	4:02:12.9	+1:07:43.3	0	0	0
56	29	51	Rakan Al-Rashed	Hugo Magalhães	Rakan Al-Rashed	Volkswagen Polo GTI R5	4:05:13.5	+1:10:43.9	0	0	0
57	30	50	Patrick Déjean	Yannick Jammes	Patrick Déjean	Citroën C3 Rally2	5:00:21.8	+2:05:52.2	0	0	0
Retired SS13		35	Stéphane Sarrazin	Jacques-Julien Renucci	Stéphane Sarrazin	Volkswagen Polo GTI R5	Crash		0	0	0
Did not start		27	Nil Solans	Axel Coronado Jiménez	Nil Solans	Hyundai i20 N Rally2	Withdrawn		0	0	0
Did not start		55	Filippo Marchino	Pietro Elia Ometto	Filippo Marchino	Škoda Fabia R5	Withdrawn		0	0	0

==== Special stages ====
Stage	Open Championship				Junior Championship				Masters Cup			
Stage	Winners	Car	Time	Class leaders	Winners	Car	Time	Class leaders	Winners	Car	Time	Class leaders
SD	López / Rozada	Hyundai i20 N Rally2	2:48.8	—N/a	López / Rozada	Hyundai i20 N Rally2	2:48.8	—N/a	Miele / Beltrame	Škoda Fabia Rally2 evo	2:58.6	—N/a
SS1	Lindholm / Hämäläinen	Škoda Fabia Rally2 evo	5:42.5	Lindholm / Hämäläinen	Lindholm / Hämäläinen	Škoda Fabia Rally2 evo	5:42.5	Lindholm / Hämäläinen	A. Kremer / E. Kremer	Škoda Fabia Rally2 evo	6:09.7	A. Kremer / E. Kremer
SS2	Rossel / Dunand	Citroën C3 Rally2	7:14.7	Gryazin / Aleksandrov	Gryazin / Aleksandrov	Škoda Fabia Rally2 evo	7:14.8	Gryazin / Aleksandrov	A. Kremer / E. Kremer	Škoda Fabia Rally2 evo	7:36.4	A. Kremer / E. Kremer
SS3	Suninen / Markkula	Hyundai i20 N Rally2	13:14.6	Gryazin / Aleksandrov	Marczyk / Gospodarczyk	Škoda Fabia Rally2 evo	13:18.4	Gryazin / Aleksandrov	Miele / Beltrame	Škoda Fabia Rally2 evo	13:42.1	Miele / Beltrame
SS4	Suninen / Markkula	Hyundai i20 N Rally2	9:07.6	Suninen / Markkula	Gryazin / Aleksandrov	Škoda Fabia Rally2 evo	9:11.6	Gryazin / Aleksandrov	Miele / Beltrame	Škoda Fabia Rally2 evo	9:26.1	Miele / Beltrame
SS5	Lindholm / Hämäläinen	Škoda Fabia Rally2 evo	5:25.9	Suninen / Markkula	Lindholm / Hämäläinen	Škoda Fabia Rally2 evo	5:25.9	Gryazin / Aleksandrov	A. Kremer / E. Kremer	Škoda Fabia Rally2 evo	5:41.8	Miele / Beltrame
SS6	López / Rozada	Hyundai i20 N Rally2	7:05.0	Suninen / Markkula	López / Rozada	Hyundai i20 N Rally2	7:05.0	Gryazin / Aleksandrov	A. Kremer / E. Kremer	Škoda Fabia Rally2 evo	7:20.1	Miele / Beltrame
SS7	Suninen / Markkula	Hyundai i20 N Rally2	12:53.5	Suninen / Markkula	Lindholm / Hämäläinen	Škoda Fabia Rally2 evo	12:56.9	Gryazin / Aleksandrov	A. Kremer / E. Kremer	Škoda Fabia Rally2 evo	13:37.5	A. Kremer / E. Kremer
SS8	Suninen / Markkula	Hyundai i20 N Rally2	9:03.0	Suninen / Markkula	Gryazin / Aleksandrov	Škoda Fabia Rally2 evo	9:03.8	Gryazin / Aleksandrov	A. Kremer / E. Kremer	Škoda Fabia Rally2 evo	9:26.0	A. Kremer / E. Kremer
SS9	Suninen / Markkula	Hyundai i20 N Rally2	7:48.9	Suninen / Markkula	Lindholm / Hämäläinen	Škoda Fabia Rally2 evo	7:50.1	Gryazin / Aleksandrov	A. Kremer / E. Kremer	Škoda Fabia Rally2 evo	8:05.8	A. Kremer / E. Kremer
SS10	Suninen / Markkula	Hyundai i20 N Rally2	11:52.3	Suninen / Markkula	Gryazin / Aleksandrov	Škoda Fabia Rally2 evo	11:58.7	Gryazin / Aleksandrov	A. Kremer / E. Kremer	Škoda Fabia Rally2 evo	12:21.5	A. Kremer / E. Kremer
SS11	Stage interrupted											
SS12	Rossel / Dunand	Citroën C3 Rally2	7:48.8	Suninen / Markkula	Lindholm / Hämäläinen	Škoda Fabia Rally2 evo	7:49.3	Gryazin / Aleksandrov	A. Kremer / E. Kremer	Škoda Fabia Rally2 evo	8:02.1	A. Kremer / E. Kremer
SS13	Stage interrupted											
SS14	Suninen / Markkula	Hyundai i20 N Rally2	12:49.6	Suninen / Markkula	Gryazin / Aleksandrov	Škoda Fabia Rally2 evo	12:55.7	Gryazin / Aleksandrov	A. Kremer / E. Kremer	Škoda Fabia Rally2 evo	13:19.0	A. Kremer / E. Kremer
SS15	López / Rozada	Hyundai i20 N Rally2	2:28.7	Suninen / Markkula	López / Rozada	Hyundai i20 N Rally2	2:28.7	Gryazin / Aleksandrov	A. Kremer / E. Kremer	Škoda Fabia Rally2 evo	2:36.7	A. Kremer / E. Kremer
SS16	Suninen / Markkula	Hyundai i20 N Rally2	7:29.5	Suninen / Markkula	Cachón / López Fernández	Citroën C3 Rally2	7:30.2	Gryazin / Aleksandrov	Miele / Beltrame	Škoda Fabia Rally2 evo	7:45.8	A. Kremer / E. Kremer
SS17	Lindholm / Hämäläinen	Škoda Fabia Rally2 evo	10:35.9	Suninen / Markkula	Lindholm / Hämäläinen	Škoda Fabia Rally2 evo	10:35.9	Gryazin / Aleksandrov	Miele / Beltrame	Škoda Fabia Rally2 evo	10:55.8	A. Kremer / E. Kremer
SS18	Lindholm / Hämäläinen	Škoda Fabia Rally2 evo	7:23.9	Suninen / Markkula	Lindholm / Hämäläinen	Škoda Fabia Rally2 evo	7:23.9	Gryazin / Aleksandrov	A. Kremer / E. Kremer	Škoda Fabia Rally2 evo	7:36.9	A. Kremer / E. Kremer
SS19	Lindholm / Hämäläinen	Škoda Fabia Rally2 evo	10:32.3	Suninen / Markkula	Lindholm / Hämäläinen	Škoda Fabia Rally2 evo	10:32.3	Gryazin / Aleksandrov	A. Kremer / E. Kremer	Škoda Fabia Rally2 evo	10:55.3	A. Kremer / E. Kremer

==== Championship standings ====
- **Bold text** indicates 2022 World Champions.

Pos.	Open Drivers' championships			Open Co-drivers' championships			Teams' championships			Junior Drivers' championships			Junior Co-drivers' championships			Driver Masters' championships			Co-driver Masters' championships		
Pos.	Move	Driver	Points	Move	Co-driver	Points	Move	Manufacturer	Points	Move	Manufacturer	Points	Move	Driver	Points	Move	Driver	Points	Move	Driver	Points
1		Andreas Mikkelsen	109		Torstein Eriksen	109	1	Hyundai Motorsport N	178		Emil Lindholm	126		**James Fulton**	136		Armin Kremer	125		**Laurent Magat**	125
2	1	Emil Lindholm	104	1	Reeta Hämäläinen	104	1	Toksport WRT	155	1	Nikolay Gryazin	104		Louis Louka	86		Mauro Miele	104		Michael Joseph Morrissey	61
3	1	Kajetan Kajetanowicz	104	1	Maciej Szczepaniak	104		Toksport WRT 2	134	1	Chris Ingram	92		Samu Vaaleri	65	1	Jean-Michel Raoux	85		Michela Lorigiola	48
4		Yohan Rossel	98		Konstantin Aleksandrov	85		Yaco ACCR Team	50	3	Fabrizio Zaldivar	68		Elia De Guio	25	1	Freddy Loix	83		Hans van Goor	43
5		Nikolay Gryazin	85		Valentin Sarreaud	69		Saintéloc Junior Team	40		Mikołaj Marczyk	67	New entry	Alejandro López Fernández	12		Miguel Díaz-Aboitiz	56		Jörgen Fornander	25

=== WRC-3 Rally3 ===
==== Classification ====
Position		No.	Driver	Co-driver	Entrant	Car	Time	Difference	Points
Event	Class	No.	Driver	Co-driver	Entrant	Car	Time	Difference	Open
30	1	59	Lauri Joona	Mikael Korhonen	Lauri Joona	Ford Fiesta Rally3	3:04:36.1	0.0	**25**
31	2	57	Jan Černý	Tom Woodburn	Jan Černý	Ford Fiesta Rally3	3:04:45.1	+9.0	**18**
37	3	58	Diego Dominguez Jr.	Rogelio Peñate	Diego Dominguez Jr.	Ford Fiesta Rally3	3:10:20.9	+5:44.8	**15**
49	4	60	Zoltán László	Tamás Kürti	Zoltán László	Ford Fiesta Rally3	3:22:41.5	+18:05.4	**12**

==== Special stages ====
Stage	Open Championship			
Stage	Winners	Car	Time	Class leaders
SD	Joona / Korhonen	Ford Fiesta Rally3	3:02.7	—N/a
SS1	Černý / Černohorský	Ford Fiesta Rally3	6:05.9	Černý / Černohorský
SS2	Joona / Korhonen	Ford Fiesta Rally3	7:43.8	Černý / Černohorský
SS3	Joona / Korhonen	Ford Fiesta Rally3	13:54.4	Černý / Černohorský
SS4	Joona / Korhonen	Ford Fiesta Rally3	9:39.7	Černý / Černohorský
SS5	Joona / Korhonen	Ford Fiesta Rally3	5:43.8	Černý / Černohorský
SS6	Joona / Korhonen	Ford Fiesta Rally3	7:30.0	Joona / Korhonen
SS7	Joona / Korhonen	Ford Fiesta Rally3	13:46.3	Joona / Korhonen
SS8	Joona / Korhonen	Ford Fiesta Rally3	9:39.7	Joona / Korhonen
SS9	Černý / Černohorský	Ford Fiesta Rally3	8:59.4	Joona / Korhonen
SS10	Černý / Černohorský	Ford Fiesta Rally3	12:40.4	Černý / Černohorský
SS11	Stage interrupted			
SS12	Černý / Černohorský	Ford Fiesta Rally3	8:22.4	Černý / Černohorský
SS13	Stage interrupted			
SS14	Joona / Korhonen	Ford Fiesta Rally3	13:43.2	Joona / Korhonen
SS15	Černý / Černohorský	Ford Fiesta Rally3	2:39.3	Joona / Korhonen
SS16	Joona / Korhonen	Ford Fiesta Rally3	7:51.9	Joona / Korhonen
SS17	Joona / Korhonen	Ford Fiesta Rally3	11:12.4	Joona / Korhonen
SS18	Černý / Černohorský	Ford Fiesta Rally3	7:50.0	Joona / Korhonen
SS19	Černý / Černohorský	Ford Fiesta Rally3	11:09.1	Joona / Korhonen

==== Championship standings ====
- **Bold text** indicates 2022 World Champions.

Pos.	Open Drivers' championships			Open Co-drivers' championships		
Pos.	Move	Driver	Points	Move	Co-driver	Points
1	2	**Lauri Joona**	111		**Enni Mälkönen**	87
2		Jan Černý	104	1	Mikael Korhonen	86
3	2	Sami Pajari	87	1	Tamás Kürti	73
4	1	Zoltán László	73	2	Liam Regan	63
5	1	William Creighton	63		Manuel Fenoli	48

== Notes ==
Previous rally: 2022 Rally New Zealand	2022 FIA World Rally Championship	Next rally: 2022 Rally Japan
Previous rally: 2021 Rally Catalunya	2022 Rally Catalunya	Next rally: TBD
