= 2019 Rally Catalunya =

55th edition of Rally de Catalunya

2019 Rally Catalunya: 55. RallyRACC Catalunya - Costa Daurada
Round 13 of 14 in the 2019 World Rally Championship
← Previous event	Next event →
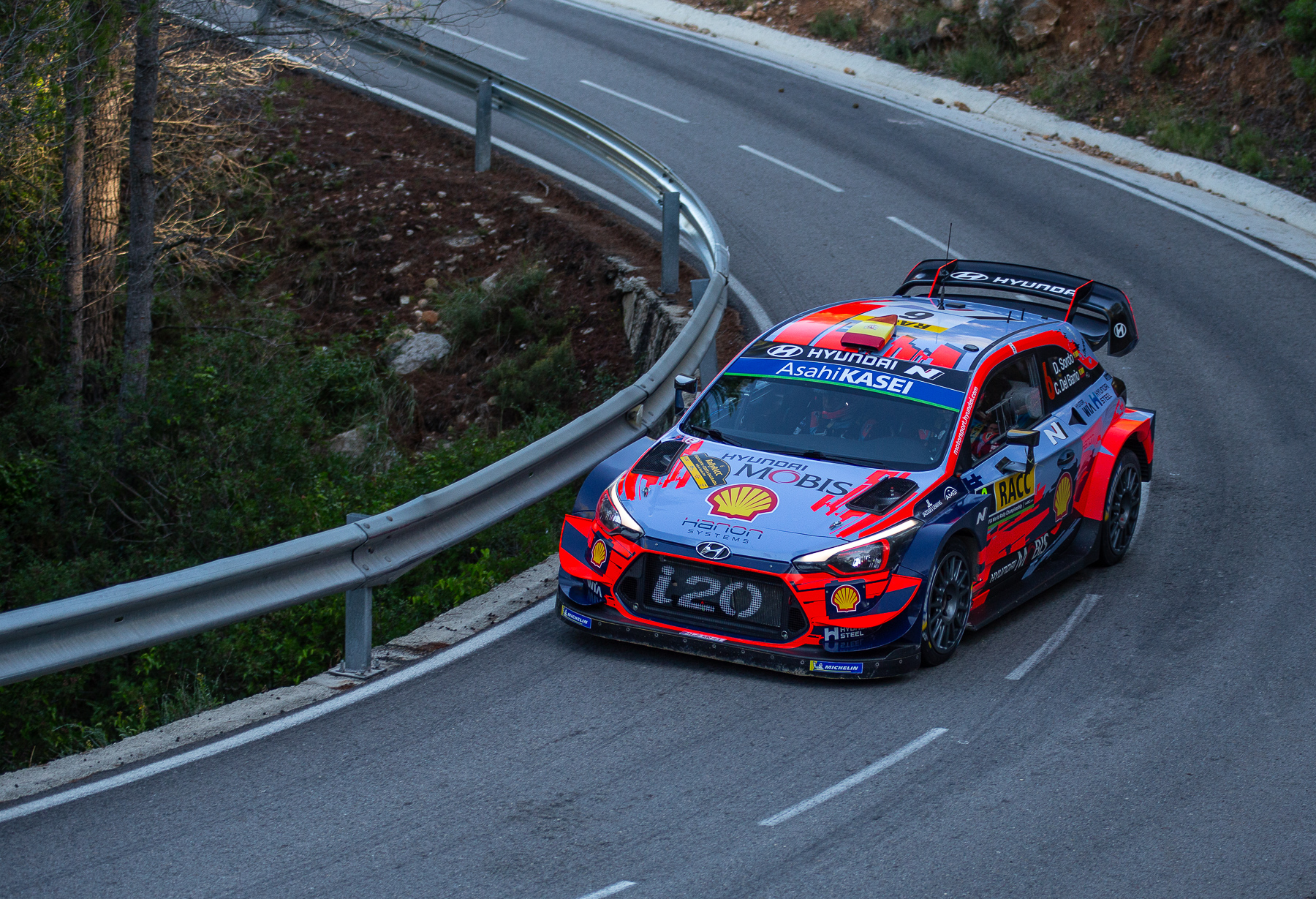
- Home heroes Dani Sordo and Carlos del Barrio driving a Hyundai i20 Coupe WRC through a stage.
- Host country: Spain
- Rally base: Salou, Tarragona
- Dates run: 24 – 27 October 2019
- Start location: Gandesa, Tarragona
- Finish location: Baix Camp, Tarragona
- Stages: 17 (325.56 km; 202.29 miles)
- Stage surface: Gravel / Tarmac
- Transport distance: 953.78 km (592.65 miles)
- Overall distance: 1,278.86 km (794.65 miles)

Statistics
- Crews registered: 64
- Crews: 61 at start, 42 at finish

Overall results
- Overall winner: (Belgium) Thierry Neuville (Belgium) Nicolas Gilsoul (South Korea) Hyundai Shell Mobis WRT; 3:07:39.6
- Power Stage winner: (Estonia) Ott Tänak (Estonia) Martin Järveoja (Japan) Toyota Gazoo Racing WRT

Support category results
- WRC-2 winner: (France) Eric Camilli (France) Benjamin Veillas (France) Eric Camilli; 3:16:26.8

The 2019 Rally Catalunya (also known as RallyRACC Catalunya - Costa Daurada 2019) was a motor racing event for rally cars which was held over four days between 24 and 27 October 2019. It marks the fifty-fifth running of Rally Catalunya and was the thirteenth round of the 2019 World Rally Championship, the newly created WRC-2 Pro class, World Rally Championship-2, the Spanish national Rally Championship and Peugeot Rally Cup Ibérica championship. (Note: Only the first leg of the rally counts towards the Peugeot Rally Cup Ibérica championship.) The 2019 event was based in Salou in Tarragona, and was contested over seventeen special stages with a total a competitive distance of 325.56 km (202.29 mi).

Nine-time world champions Sébastien Loeb and Daniel Elena were the defending rally winners. Citroën Total WRT, the team they drove for in 2018, were the defending manufacturers' winners. The Finnish crew of Kalle Rovanperä and Jonne Halttunen were the defending rally winners in the World Rally Championship-2 category, but they did not defend their titles as they were promoted to the newly created WRC-2 Pro class.

Thierry Neuville and Nicolas Gilsoul won the rally for the first time in their career. Their team, Hyundai Shell Mobis WRT, were the manufacturers' winners. The Citroën Total crew of Mads Østberg and Torstein Eriksen won the WRC-2 Pro category, finishing first in the combined WRC-2 category, while the French crew of Eric Camilli and Benjamin Veillas won the wider WRC-2 class.

Ott Tänak and Martin Järveoja finished second overall as well as taking the power stage victory, which was enough for them to seal their maiden World Rally Championship titles. This made Tänak the first non-French driver to be World Rally Champion since Petter Solberg won the 2003 World Rally Championship title, ending a run of 5,831 days in which a Sébastien was the current champion. With a 2-3 finish in the Pro category, Škoda Motorsport took the first World Rally Championship-2 Pro manufacturers’ title.

== Background ==
=== Championship standings prior to the event ===
Ott Tänak and Martin Järveoja led both the drivers' and co-drivers' championships by twenty-eight-points ahead of defending world champions Sébastien Ogier and Julien Ingrassia. Thierry Neuville and Nicolas Gilsoul were third, a further thirteen points behind. In the World Rally Championship for Manufacturers, Hyundai Shell Mobis WRT held an eight-point lead over Toyota Gazoo Racing WRT.

In the World Rally Championship-2 Pro standings, newly crowned champions Kalle Rovanperä and Jonne Halttunen led by sixty-six points in the drivers' and co-drivers' standings respectively. Gus Greensmith and Elliott Edmondson are second, with Mads Østberg and Torstein Eriksen further five points behind in third. In the manufacturers' championship, Škoda Motorsport led M-Sport Ford WRT by fifty-three points, with Citroën Total over a hundred points behind in third.

In the World Rally Championship-2 standings, Pierre-Louis Loubet and Vincent Landais led the drivers' and co-drivers' standings by six and eight points respectively. Benito Guerra and Maciej Szczepaniak were second, while Kajetan Kajetanowicz and Yaroslav Fedorov were third.

=== Entry list ===
The following crews entered into the rally. The event opened to crews competing in the World Rally Championship, World Rally Championship-2, WRC-2 Pro, Spanish national Rally Championship, Peugeot Rally Cup Ibérica championship and privateer entries not registered to score points in any championship. A total of sixty-four entries were received, with eleven crews entered with World Rally Cars and twenty-four entered the World Rally Championship-2. Four crews were nominated to score points in the Pro class.

No.	Driver	Co-Driver	Entrant	Car	Tyre
World Rally Car entries
1	(France) Sébastien Ogier	(France) Julien Ingrassia	(France) Citroën Total WRT	Citroën C3 WRC	M
3	(Finland) Teemu Suninen	(Finland) Jarmo Lehtinen	(United Kingdom) M-Sport Ford WRT	Ford Fiesta WRC	M
4	(Finland) Esapekka Lappi	(Finland) Janne Ferm	(France) Citroën Total WRT	Citroën C3 WRC	M
5	(United Kingdom) Kris Meeke	(United Kingdom) Sebastian Marshall	(Japan) Toyota Gazoo Racing WRT	Toyota Yaris WRC	M
6	(Spain) Dani Sordo	(Spain) Carlos del Barrio	(South Korea) Hyundai Shell Mobis WRT	Hyundai i20 Coupe WRC	M
8	(Estonia) Ott Tänak	(Estonia) Martin Järveoja	(Japan) Toyota Gazoo Racing WRT	Toyota Yaris WRC	M
10	(Finland) Jari-Matti Latvala	(Finland) Miikka Anttila	(Japan) Toyota Gazoo Racing WRT	Toyota Yaris WRC	M
11	(Belgium) Thierry Neuville	(Belgium) Nicolas Gilsoul	(South Korea) Hyundai Shell Mobis WRT	Hyundai i20 Coupe WRC	M
17	(Japan) Takamoto Katsuta	(United Kingdom) Daniel Barritt	(Finland) Tommi Mäkinen Racing	Toyota Yaris WRC	M
19	(France) Sébastien Loeb	(Monaco) Daniel Elena	(South Korea) Hyundai Shell Mobis WRT	Hyundai i20 Coupe WRC	M
33	(United Kingdom) Elfyn Evans	(United Kingdom) Scott Martin	(United Kingdom) M-Sport Ford WRT	Ford Fiesta WRC	M
World Rally Championship-2 Pro entries
21	(Finland) Kalle Rovanperä	(Finland) Jonne Halttunen	(Czech Republic) Škoda Motorsport	Škoda Fabia R5 Evo	M
22	(United Kingdom) Gus Greensmith	(United Kingdom) Elliott Edmondson	(United Kingdom) M-Sport Ford WRT	Ford Fiesta R5 Mk. II	M
23	(Norway) Mads Østberg	(Norway) Torstein Eriksen	(France) Citroën Total (Note: Entry run in conjunction with DG Sport.)	Citroën C3 R5	M
24	(Czech Republic) Jan Kopecký	(Czech Republic) Jan Hloušek	(Czech Republic) Škoda Motorsport	Škoda Fabia R5 Evo	M
World Rally Championship-2 entries
41	(France) Pierre-Louis Loubet	(France) Vincent Landais	(France) Pierre-Louis Loubet (Note: Entry operated by Qatar 2C World Rally Team.)	Škoda Fabia R5 Evo	M
42	(Mexico) Benito Guerra	(Spain) Daniel Cué	(Mexico) Benito Guerra (Note: Entry operated by Race Seven.)	Škoda Fabia R5 Evo	M
43	(Poland) Kajetan Kajetanowicz	(Poland) Maciej Szczepaniak	(Poland) Kajetan Kajetanowicz (Note: Entry operated by Lotos Dynamic Rally Team.)	Volkswagen Polo GTI R5	P
44	(Russia) Nikolay Gryazin	(Russia) Yaroslav Fedorov	(Russia) Nikolay Gryazin (Note: Entry operated by Sports Racing Technologies.)	Škoda Fabia R5 Evo	M
45	(Bolivia) Marco Bulacia Wilkinson	(Argentina) Fabian Cretu	(Bolivia) Marco Bulacia Wilkinson (Note: Entry operated by VIALCO Racing.)	Škoda Fabia R5	M
46	(Italy) Fabio Andolfi	(Italy) Simone Scattolin	(Italy) Fabio Andolfi (Note: Entry operated by ACI Team Italia WRC.)	Škoda Fabia R5	P
47	(Norway) Ole Christian Veiby	(Sweden) Jonas Andersson	(Norway) Ole Christian Veiby (Note: Entry operated by Volkswagen Dealer Team Bauhaus.)	Volkswagen Polo GTI R5	M
48	(Chile) Alberto Heller	(Argentina) José Díaz	(Chile) Alberto Heller	Ford Fiesta R5 Mk. II	M
49	(Brazil) Paulo Nobre	(Brazil) Gabriel Morales	(Brazil) Paulo Nobre (Note: Entry operated by Palmeirinha Rally.)	Škoda Fabia R5	P
50	(France) Adrien Fourmaux	(Belgium) Renaud Jamoul	(France) Adrien Fourmaux (Note: Entry operated by Equipe de France FFSA.)	Ford Fiesta R5	M
51	(United Kingdom) Rhys Yates	(United Kingdom) James Morgan	(United Kingdom) Rhys Yates	Hyundai i20 R5	P
52	(Romania) Simone Tempestini	(Romania) Sergiu Itu	(Romania) Simone Tempestini (Note: Entry operated by Friulmotor Rally Team.)	Hyundai i20 R5	P
53	(Finland) Emil Lindholm	(Finland) Mikael Korhonen	(Finland) Emil Lindholm (Note: Entry operated by TGS Worldwide.)	Volkswagen Polo GTI R5	M
54	(Belgium) Guillaume De Mevius	(Belgium) Martijn Wydaeghe	(Belgium) Guillaume De Mevius (Note: Entry operated by DG Sport.)	Citroën C3 R5	M
55	(Italy) "Pedro" (Note: Pseudonym of Massimo Pedretti.)	(Italy) Emanuele Baldaccini	(Italy) "Pedro" (Note: Entry supported by M-Sport.)	Ford Fiesta R5 Mk. II	P
56	(France) Eric Camilli	(France) Benjamin Veillas	(France) Eric Camilli (Note: Entry operated by Saintéloc Racing.)	Citroën C3 R5	M
57	(Spain) Nil Solans	(Spain) Marc Martí	(Spain) Nil Solans (Note: Entry operated by RTS Rally.)	Volkswagen Polo GTI R5	P
58	(Spain) José Antonio Suárez	(Spain) Alberto Iglesias	(Spain) José Antonio Suárez	Škoda Fabia R5	M
59	(Spain) Jan Solans	(Spain) Mauro Barreiro	(Spain) Jan Solans	Ford Fiesta R5 Mk. II	P
Other Major Entries
80	(Paraguay) Fabrizio Zaldivar	(Argentina) Fernando Mussano	(Paraguay) Fabrizio Zaldivar	Ford Fiesta R2	P

=== Route ===
The La Mussara stage is scheduled to return to the itinerary for the first time since 2014 and due to run as the Power stage on Sunday.

==== Itinerary ====
All dates and times are CEST (UTC+2) from 24 to 26 October 2019 and CET (UTC+1) on 27 October 2019.

Date	Time	No.	Stage name	Distance
24 October	9:01	—	Salou [Shakedown]	2.00 km
Leg 1 — 129.70 km
25 October	9:23	SS1	Gandesa 1	7.00 km
25 October	10:03	SS2	Horta-Bot 1	19.00 km
25 October	11:13	SS3	La Fatarella — Vilalba 1	38.85 km
25 October	15:26	SS4	Gandesa 2	7.00 km
25 October	16:06	SS5	Horta-Bot 2	19.00 km
25 October	17:16	SS6	La Fatarella — Vilalba 2	38.85 km
Leg 2 — 121.72 km
26 October	9:00	SS7	Savallà 1	14.08 km
26 October	9:41	SS8	Querol 1	21.26 km
26 October	10:38	SS9	El Montmell 1	24.40 km
26 October	14:01	SS10	Savallà 2	14.08 km
26 October	14:42	SS11	Querol 2	21.26 km
26 October	15:38	SS12	El Montmell 2	24.40 km
26 October	17:30	SS13	Salou	2.24 km
Leg 3 — 74.14 km
27 October	7:41	SS14	Riudecanyes 1	16.35 km
27 October	8:38	SS15	La Mussara 1	20.72 km
27 October	10:54	SS16	Riudecanyes 2	16.35 km
27 October	12:18	SS17	La Mussara 2 [Power Stage]	20.72 km

== Report ==
=== World Rally Cars ===
It was a devastating blow for the reigning world champion Sébastien Ogier's title hope. After setting the fastest stage time at the opening stage, the Frenchman's C3 was crawling through the rest of the morning loop due to power steering failure and loss of hydraulics, which lost the six-time world champion nearly three minutes. Citroën's rally went from bad to worse as Esapekka Lappi retired from the rally with engine issues in the afternoon loop. Hyundai ended the first leg in 1-2-3 after all three drivers set impressive times, until Kris Meeke broke the monopoly after the first stage of the second leg. However, his position was short-lived as the Briton understeer into the barrier and retired from the day. Despite Meeke's retirement, the Korean squad's 1-2-3 was still under threat from the title-chasing Ott Tänak, who won four stages on Saturday. The championship leader was flying through the power stage and snatched second from local hero Dani Sordo to seal his maiden WRC title. Thierry Neuville eventually won the rally for the first time in Spain.

==== Classification ====
Position		No.	Driver	Co-driver	Entrant	Car	Time	Difference	Points	
Event	Class	No.	Driver	Co-driver	Entrant	Car	Time	Difference	Event	Stage
1	1	11	Thierry Neuville	Nicolas Gilsoul	Hyundai Shell Mobis WRT	Hyundai i20 Coupe WRC	3:07:39.6	0.0	25	3
2	2	8	Ott Tänak	Martin Järveoja	Toyota Gazoo Racing WRT	Toyota Yaris WRC	3:07:56.8	+17.2	18	5
3	3	6	Dani Sordo	Carlos del Barrio	Hyundai Shell Mobis WRT	Hyundai i20 Coupe WRC	3:07:57.2	+17.6	15	2
4	4	19	Sébastien Loeb	Daniel Elena	Hyundai Shell Mobis WRT	Hyundai i20 Coupe WRC	3:08:33.5	+53.9	12	0
5	5	10	Jari-Matti Latvala	Miikka Anttila	Toyota Gazoo Racing WRT	Toyota Yaris WRC	3:08:39.8	+1:00.2	10	0
6	6	7	Elfyn Evans	Scott Martin	M-Sport Ford WRT	Ford Fiesta WRC	3:08:53.8	+1:14.2	8	4
7	7	3	Teemu Suninen	Marko Salminen	M-Sport Ford WRT	Ford Fiesta WRC	3:09:27.2	+1:47.6	6	0
8	8	1	Sébastien Ogier	Julien Ingrassia	Citroën Total WRT	Citroën C3 WRC	3:12:00.1	+4:20.5	4	1
29	9	5	Kris Meeke	Sebastian Marshall	Toyota Gazoo Racing WRT	Toyota Yaris WRC	3:49:59.6	+42:20.0	0	0
39	10	17	Takamoto Katsuta	Daniel Barritt	Tommi Mäkinen Racing	Toyota Yaris WRC	4:03:36.4	+55:56.8	0	0
Retired SS5		4	Esapekka Lappi	Janne Ferm	Citroën Total WRT	Citroën C3 WRC	Engine		0	0

==== Special stages ====
Date	No.	Stage name	Distance	Winners	Car	Time	Class leaders
24 October	—	Salou [Shakedown]	2.00 km	Meeke / Marshall	Toyota Yaris WRC	1:31.6	—N/a
25 October	SS1	Gandesa 1	7.00 km	Ogier / Ingrassia	Citroën C3 WRC	4:16.8	Ogier / Ingrassia
25 October	SS2	Horta-Bot 1	19.00 km	Neuville / Gilsoul	Hyundai i20 Coupe WRC	10:18.5	Neuville / Gilsoul
25 October	SS3	La Fatarella — Vilalba 1	38.85 km	Loeb / Elena	Hyundai i20 Coupe WRC	26:30.9	Sordo / del Barrio
25 October	SS4	Gandesa 2	7.00 km	Sordo / del Barrio	Hyundai i20 Coupe WRC	4:12.0	Sordo / del Barrio
25 October	SS5	Horta-Bot 2	19.00 km	Loeb / Elena	Hyundai i20 Coupe WRC	10:01.5	Sordo / del Barrio
25 October	SS6	La Fatarella — Vilalba 2	38.85 km	Loeb / Elena	Hyundai i20 Coupe WRC	25:46.8	Loeb / Elena
26 October	SS7	Savallà 1	14.08 km	Neuville / Gilsoul	Hyundai i20 Coupe WRC	7:25.9	Neuville / Gilsoul
26 October	SS8	Querol 1	21.26 km	Neuville / Gilsoul	Hyundai i20 Coupe WRC	10:52.4	Neuville / Gilsoul
26 October	SS9	El Montmell 1	24.40 km	Tänak / Järveoja	Toyota Yaris WRC	12:16.2	Neuville / Gilsoul
26 October	SS10	Savallà 2	14.08 km	Tänak / Järveoja	Toyota Yaris WRC	7:25.2	Neuville / Gilsoul
26 October	SS11	Querol 2	21.26 km	Tänak / Järveoja	Toyota Yaris WRC	10:55.6	Neuville / Gilsoul
26 October	SS12	El Montmell 2	24.40 km	Tänak / Järveoja	Toyota Yaris WRC	12:12.7	Neuville / Gilsoul
26 October	SS13	Salou	2.24 km	Neuville / Gilsoul	Hyundai i20 Coupe WRC	2:35.7	Neuville / Gilsoul
27 October	SS14	Riudecanyes 1	16.35 km	Neuville / Gilsoul	Hyundai i20 Coupe WRC	10:13.5	Neuville / Gilsoul
27 October	SS15	La Mussara 1	20.72 km	Sordo / del Barrio	Hyundai i20 Coupe WRC	10:58.5	Neuville / Gilsoul
27 October	SS16	Riudecanyes 2	16.35 km	Sordo / del Barrio	Hyundai i20 Coupe WRC	10:11.4	Neuville / Gilsoul
27 October	SS17	La Mussara 2 [Power Stage]	20.72 km	Tänak / Järveoja	Toyota Yaris WRC	10:49.6	Neuville / Gilsoul

==== Championship standings ====
- **Bold text** indicates 2019 World Champions.

Pos.	Drivers' championships			Co-drivers' championships			Manufacturers' championships		
Pos.	Move	Driver	Points	Move	Co-driver	Points	Move	Manufacturer	Points
1		**Ott Tänak**	263		**Martin Järveoja**	263		Hyundai Shell Mobis WRT	380
2	1	Thierry Neuville	227	1	Nicolas Gilsoul	227		Toyota Gazoo Racing WRT	362
3	1	Sébastien Ogier	217	1	Julien Ingrassia	217		Citroën Total WRT	284
4		Andreas Mikkelsen	102		Anders Jæger-Amland	102		M-Sport Ford WRT	218
5	1	Elfyn Evans	102	1	Scott Martin	102			

=== World Rally Championship-2 Pro ===
Mads Østberg dominated Friday with an over-40-second lead going into Saturday. However, the Norwegian's lead was under a big threat from the freshly-crowned WRC-2 Pro champion Kalle Rovanperä, until the youngster hit a post in the Salou stage and damaged the rear axle on his Fabia R5. That left Østberg comfortable to win the category.

==== Classification ====
Position		No.	Driver	Co-driver	Entrant	Car	Time	Difference	Points	
Event	Class	No.	Driver	Co-driver	Entrant	Car	Time	Difference	Class	Event
9	1	23	Mads Østberg	Torstein Eriksen	Citroën Total	Citroën C3 R5	3:16:04.2	0.0	**25**	**2**
11	2	24	Jan Kopecký	Jan Hloušek	Škoda Motorsport	Škoda Fabia R5 Evo	3:16:36.1	+54.7	**18**	**0**
12	3	21	Kalle Rovanperä	Jonne Halttunen	Škoda Motorsport	Škoda Fabia R5 Evo	3:17:33.3	+1:29.1	**15**	**0**
15	4	22	Gus Greensmith	Elliott Edmondson	M-Sport Ford WRT	Ford Fiesta R5 Mk. II	3:19:23.7	+3:19.5	**12**	**0**

==== Special stages ====
Results in bold denote first in the RC2 class, the class which both the WRC-2 Pro and WRC-2 championships run to.

Date	No.	Stage name	Distance	Winners	Car	Time	Class leaders
24 October	—	Salou [Shakedown]	2.00 km	Østberg / Eriksen	Citroën C3 R5	1:35.7	—N/a
25 October	SS1	Gandesa 1	7.00 km	**Østberg / Eriksen**	Citroën C3 R5	4:28.2	Østberg / Eriksen
25 October	SS2	Horta-Bot 1	19.00 km	**Østberg / Eriksen**	Citroën C3 R5	10:38.5	Østberg / Eriksen
25 October	SS3	La Fatarella — Vilalba 1	38.85 km	Østberg / Eriksen	Citroën C3 R5	27:28.9	Østberg / Eriksen
25 October	SS4	Gandesa 2	7.00 km	Østberg / Eriksen	Citroën C3 R5	4:23.5	Østberg / Eriksen
25 October	SS5	Horta-Bot 2	19.00 km	Østberg / Eriksen	Citroën C3 R5	10:25.2	Østberg / Eriksen
25 October	SS6	La Fatarella — Vilalba 2	38.85 km	Østberg / Eriksen	Citroën C3 R5	27:08.2	Østberg / Eriksen
26 October	SS7	Savallà 1	14.08 km	**Kopecký / Hloušek**	Škoda Fabia R5 Evo	7:51.5	Østberg / Eriksen
26 October	SS8	Querol 1	21.26 km	**Rovanperä / Halttunen**	Škoda Fabia R5 Evo	11:23.7	Østberg / Eriksen
26 October	SS9	El Montmell 1	24.40 km	**Kopecký / Hloušek**	Škoda Fabia R5 Evo	12:53.7	Østberg / Eriksen
26 October	SS10	Savallà 2	14.08 km	**Rovanperä / Halttunen**	Škoda Fabia R5 Evo	7:46.2	Østberg / Eriksen
26 October	SS11	Querol 2	21.26 km	**Rovanperä / Halttunen**	Škoda Fabia R5 Evo	11:22.5	Østberg / Eriksen
26 October	SS12	El Montmell 2	24.40 km	Kopecký / Hloušek	Škoda Fabia R5 Evo	12:51.2	Østberg / Eriksen
26 October	SS13	Salou	2.24 km	Kopecký / Hloušek	Škoda Fabia R5 Evo	2:38.8	Østberg / Eriksen
27 October	SS14	Riudecanyes 1	16.35 km	**Kopecký / Hloušek**	Škoda Fabia R5 Evo	10:38.2	Østberg / Eriksen
27 October	SS15	La Mussara 1	20.72 km	**Østberg / Eriksen**	Citroën C3 R5	11:32.6	Østberg / Eriksen
27 October	SS16	Riudecanyes 2	16.35 km	Østberg / Eriksen	Citroën C3 R5	10:36.1	Østberg / Eriksen
27 October	SS17	La Mussara 2	20.72 km	Østberg / Eriksen	Citroën C3 R5	11:25.2	Østberg / Eriksen

==== Championship standings ====
- **Bold text** indicates 2019 World Champions.

Pos.	Drivers' championships			Co-drivers' championships			Manufacturers' championships		
Pos.	Move	Driver	Points	Move	Co-driver	Points	Move	Manufacturer	Points
1		**Kalle Rovanperä**	206		**Jonne Halttunen**	206		**Škoda Motorsport**	333
2	1	Mads Østberg	145	1	Torstein Eriksen	145		M-Sport Ford WRT	259
3	1	Gus Greensmith	137	1	Elliott Edmondson	137		Citroën Total	145
4		Jan Kopecký	115		Pavel Dresler	79			
5		Łukasz Pieniążek	74		Kamil Heller	62			

=== World Rally Championship-2 ===
Nil Solans took an early lead, but a double puncture dropped the local hero over eight minutes. Championship leader Pierre-Louis Loubet edged Eric Camilli by only 1.5 seconds after Friday, but Camilli surpassed Loubet and built a comfortable lead before the day ended. Championship contender Benito Guerra retired from the rally due to mechanical issues.

On Sunday, Loubet went off the road and beached his Fabia, which dropped him to fifth. Although the Frenchman still remained on top, his lead was down to just three points. Camilli won the class in the end to give C3 R5 an 1-2 finish in the combined R5 class with Østberg.

==== Classification ====
Position		No.	Driver	Co-driver	Entrant	Car	Time	Difference	Points	
Event	Class	No.	Driver	Co-driver	Entrant	Car	Time	Difference	Class	Event
10	1	49	Eric Camilli	Benjamin Veillas	Eric Camilli	Citroën C3 R5	3:16:26.8	0.0	25	1
13	2	53	Emil Lindholm	Mikael Korhonen	Emil Lindholm	Volkswagen Polo GTI R5	3:18:07.5	+1:40.7	18	0
14	3	43	Kajetan Kajetanowicz	Maciej Szczepaniak	Kajetan Kajetanowicz	Volkswagen Polo GTI R5	3:18:23.3	+1:56.5	15	0
16	4	44	Ole Christian Veiby	Jonas Andersson	Ole Christian Veiby	Volkswagen Polo GTI R5	3:19:37.1	+3:10.3	12	0
17	5	41	Pierre-Louis Loubet	Vincent Landais	Pierre-Louis Loubet	Škoda Fabia R5 Evo	3:20:09.4	+3:42.6	10	0
18	6	46	Fabio Andolfi	Simone Scattolin	Fabio Andolfi	Škoda Fabia R5	3:20:20.1	+3:53.3	8	0
19	7	58	José Antonio Suárez	Alberto Iglesias	José Antonio Suárez	Škoda Fabia R5	3:20:21.5	+3:54.7	6	0
20	8	54	Guillaume De Mevius	Martijn Wydaeghe	Guillaume De Mevius	Citroën C3 R5	3:22:50.2	+6:23.4	4	0
21	9	57	Nil Solans	Marc Martí	Nil Solans	Volkswagen Polo GTI R5	3:24:07.9	+7:41.1	2	0
22	10	59	Jan Solans	Mauro Barreiro	Jan Solans	Ford Fiesta R5 Mk. II	3:24:24.9	+7:58.1	1	0
23	11	44	Nikolay Gryazin	Yaroslav Fedorov	Nikolay Gryazin	Škoda Fabia R5 Evo	3:28:07.1	+11:40.3	0	0
25	12	55	"Pedro"	Emanuele Baldaccini	"Pedro"	Ford Fiesta R5 Mk. II	3:38:02.0	+21:35.2	0	0
32	13	50	Adrien Fourmaux	Renaud Jamoul	Adrien Fourmaux	Ford Fiesta R5 Mk. II	3:52:14.3	+35:47.5	0	0
Retired SS14		45	Marco Bulacia Wilkinson	Fabian Cretu	Marco Bulacia Wilkinson	Škoda Fabia R5	Mechanical		0	0
Retired SS14		52	Simone Tempestini	Sergiu Itu	Simone Tempestini	Hyundai i20 R5	Mechanical		0	0
Retired SS12		42	Benito Guerra	Daniel Cué	Benito Guerra	Škoda Fabia R5 Evo	Mechanical		0	0
Retired SS7		49	Paulo Nobre	Gabriel Morales	Paulo Nobre	Škoda Fabia R5	Accident		0	0

==== Special stages ====
Results in bold denote first in the RC2 class, the class which both the WRC-2 Pro and WRC-2 championships run to.

Date	No.	Stage name	Distance	Winners	Car	Time	Class leaders
24 October	—	Salou [Shakedown]	2.00 km	**Camilli / Veillas**	Citroën C3 R5	1:35.5	—N/a
25 October	SS1	Gandesa 1	7.00 km	N. Solans / Martí	Volkswagen Polo GTI R5	4:28.4	N. Solans / Martí
25 October	SS2	Horta-Bot 1	19.00 km	N. Solans / Martí	Volkswagen Polo GTI R5	10:42.8	N. Solans / Martí
25 October	SS3	La Fatarella — Vilalba 1	38.85 km	**Veiby / Andersson**	Volkswagen Polo GTI R5	27:26.3	Loubet / Landais
25 October	SS4	Gandesa 2	7.00 km	**Loubet / Landais**	Škoda Fabia R5	4:22.4	Loubet / Landais
25 October	SS5	Horta-Bot 2	19.00 km	**Camilli / Veillas**	Citroën C3 R5	10:27.0	Loubet / Landais
25 October	SS6	La Fatarella — Vilalba 2	38.85 km	**Camilli / Veillas**	Citroën C3 R5	26:58.0	Loubet / Landais
26 October	SS7	Savallà 1	14.08 km	N. Solans / Martí	Volkswagen Polo GTI R5	7:53.4	Camilli / Veillas
26 October	SS8	Querol 1	21.26 km	Veiby / Andersson	Volkswagen Polo GTI R5	11:28.6	Camilli / Veillas
26 October	SS9	El Montmell 1	24.40 km	N. Solans / Martí	Volkswagen Polo GTI R5	12:55.5	Camilli / Veillas
26 October	SS10	Savallà 2	14.08 km	Camilli / Veillas	Citroën C3 R5	7:47.9	Camilli / Veillas
26 October	SS11	Querol 2	21.26 km	N. Solans / Martí	Volkswagen Polo GTI R5	11:27.7	Camilli / Veillas
26 October	SS12	El Montmell 2	24.40 km	**N. Solans / Martí**	Volkswagen Polo GTI R5	12:49.3	Camilli / Veillas
26 October	SS13	Salou	2.24 km	**N. Solans / Martí**	Volkswagen Polo GTI R5	2:36.5	Camilli / Veillas
27 October	SS14	Riudecanyes 1	16.35 km	Camilli / Veillas	Citroën C3 R5	10:39.3	Camilli / Veillas
27 October	SS15	La Mussara 1	20.72 km	N. Solans / Martí	Volkswagen Polo GTI R5	11:33.1	Camilli / Veillas
27 October	SS16	Riudecanyes 2	16.35 km	**N. Solans / Martí**	Volkswagen Polo GTI R5	10:33.5	Camilli / Veillas
27 October	SS17	La Mussara 2	20.72 km	**N. Solans / Martí**	Volkswagen Polo GTI R5	11:24.7	Camilli / Veillas

==== Championship standings ====
Pos.	Drivers' championships			Co-drivers' championships		
Pos.	Move	Driver	Points	Move	Co-driver	Points
1		Pierre-Louis Loubet	91		Vincent Landais	91
2	1	Kajetan Kajetanowicz	88		Maciej Szczepaniak	88
3	1	Benito Guerra	75		Yaroslav Fedorov	73
4		Nikolay Gryazin	73		Jaime Zapata	69
5	1	Fabio Andolfi	64	1	Jonas Andersson	62

== Notes ==
Previous rally: 2019 Wales Rally GB	2019 FIA World Rally Championship	Next rally: 2019 Rally Australia
Previous rally: 2018 Rally Catalunya	2019 Rally Catalunya	Next rally: 2021 Rally Catalunya
