= Junior WRC =

Rallying competition for drivers under 29

FIA Junior WRC
- Category: Group Rally3
- Country: International
- Inaugural season: 2001
- Tire suppliers: Hankook
- Drivers' champion: (Sweden) Mille Johansson
- Co-Drivers' champion: (Sweden) Johan Grönvall
- Official website: www.wrc.com

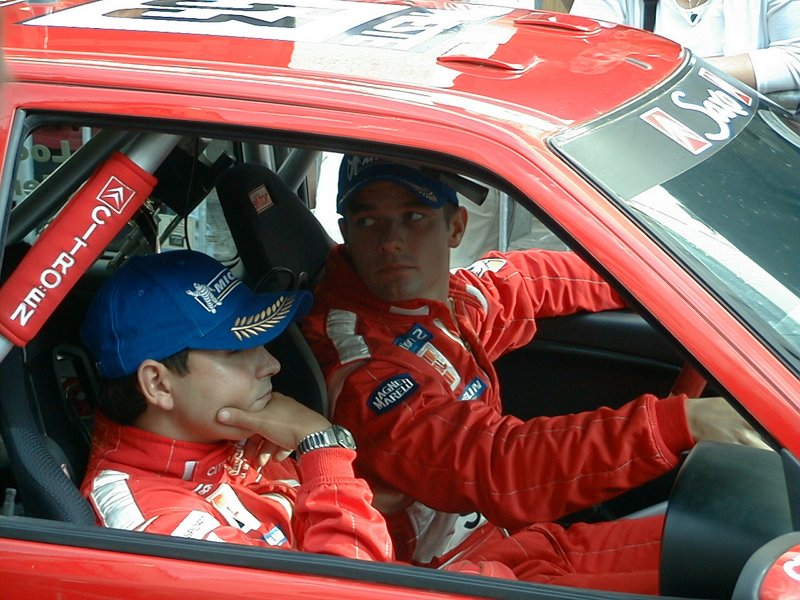
Sébastien Loeb and Daniel Elena at the 2001 Rally Finland.

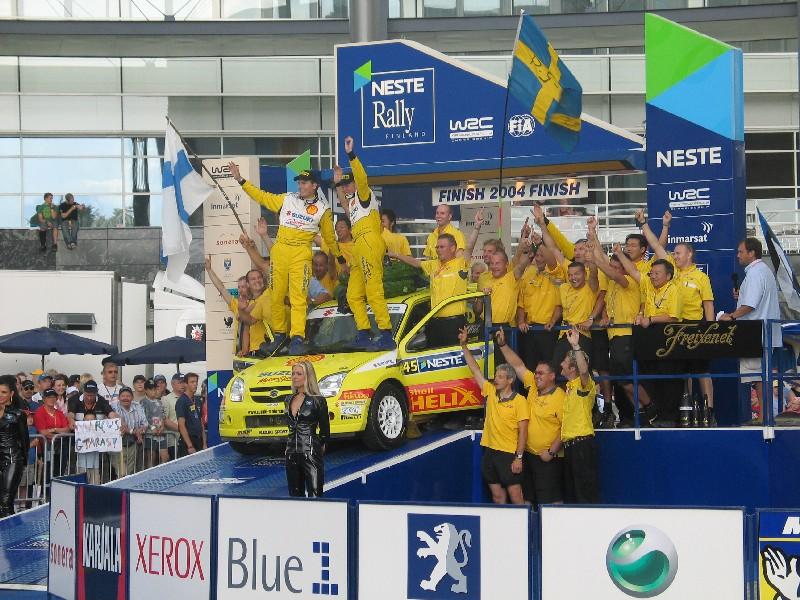
P-G Andersson and Suzuki celebrating JWRC class victory at the 2004 Rally Finland.

The FIA Junior WRC Championship is an international rallying series restricted to drivers under 29 years old, running within the framework of the World Rally Championship. The series is governed by the Fédération Internationale de l'Automobile (FIA) and promoted by M-Sport Ltd.

Run annually since 2013, the championship is the latest in the FIA's junior driver category which began in 2001 with the Super 1600 Championship, the Junior World Rally Championship in 2002, and the WRC Academy in 2011. This category has been a stepping stone in the careers of WRC champions Sebastien Loeb and Sébastien Ogier; plus leading drivers Dani Sordo, Elfyn Evans, Craig Breen and Thierry Neuville.

Junior WRC differs from the WRC support championships, WRC2 and WRC3, as the competition is managed and promoted by M-Sport under contract to the FIA. All cars are identical, provided and serviced by M-Sport on the entrants' behalf. The car used since 2022 is the company's Ford Fiesta Rally3. The championship currently consists of five select rallies of the FIA World Rally Championship (WRC) calendar. FIA Championship titles are awarded to the winning Driver and Co-Driver.

The FIA did not award Junior WRC champion titles in the 2022 season. Instead, the titles of FIA WRC3 Junior were awarded to the winners of the Junior WRC competition run by M-Sport.

== History ==
The championship's origins began in 2001 as the FIA Super 1600 Drivers' Championship, and included six events in Europe. Sébastien Loeb was the series' champion, driving a Super 1600 Citroën Saxo. The series became the Junior World Rally Championship the following year, with an upper age limit of 29 introduced in 2003.

In 2007, the championship did not include events outside Europe. Following introduction of an FIA rule in 2006 surrounding use of the word 'world' in championship names, the championship was known as the FIA Junior Rally Championship (JRC) for one season only. The 2010 season was the last Junior World Rally Championship.

In 2011, the FIA replaced the championship with the WRC Academy Cup. This was the first year the championship was managed under contract. M-Sport provided identical Ford Fiesta R2 cars for entrants to use. In 2013 the series was renamed to FIA Junior WRC.

In 2014, Citroën were awarded the contract to run Junior WRC providing Citroën DS3 R3T cars. M-Sport repurposed the old Ford Fiesta R2 units for the Drive DMACK Fiesta Trophy.

In 2017, M-Sport regained the running rights continuing to use the Ford Fiesta R2. Following the introduction of the Rally Pyramid in 2019, the latest evolution Ford Fiesta Rally4 was introduced for the second round of the 2020 season.

At the 2018 season the number of rallies were reduced to 5, while the last rally gives double points.

In March 2021 the FIA announced there will not be any two-wheel drive championships in WRC from 2022. It was later announced that the championship would switch to Rally3 four-wheel drive specifications. The FIA title for 2022 was called WRC3 Junior, however from 2023, FIA Junior WRC was restored.

== Rules ==
The Junior WRC is open to drivers under the age of 29 who have not competed as a Priority 1 (P1) driver in an FIA World Rally Championship event. Competitors drive identical Ford Fiesta Rally3 cars using Pirelli tyres. There is no obligation to enter a minimum number of rounds and all rounds contribute to the championship points tally.

The point-scoring system based on classification is the same as in the WRC, WRC2 and WRC3 championships, with points allocated to the top ten classified finishers as follows:

| Position | 1st | 2nd | 3rd | 4th | 5th | 6th | 7th | 8th | 9th | 10th |
| Points | 25 | 18 | 15 | 12 | 10 | 8 | 6 | 4 | 2 | 1 |

The last rally in the season awards double classification points to competitors who have started at least 3 previous rounds. Power Stage points are not awarded in Junior WRC as in the other WRC championships, however JWRC competitors can score one championship bonus point for each stage win during the season.

The Nations Trophy sums points of the best performing driver from each nation each round, not including stage points.

== Results ==
=== Drivers' Championship ===
| Year | Series name | Upper Age Limit (Note: According to the official WRC Sporting Regulations document for each year) | Champion | Car | 2nd place | Car | 3rd place | Car | Rounds |
|---|---|---|---|---|---|---|---|---|---|
| 2001 | FIA Super 1600 Championship for Drivers | n/a | (France) Sébastien Loeb | Citroën Saxo VTS S1600 | (Italy) Andrea Dallavilla | Fiat Punto S1600 | (United Kingdom) Niall McShea | Ford Puma S1600; Citroën Saxo VTS S1600 | 6 |
| 2002 | FIA Junior World Rally Championship | n/a | (Spain) Daniel Solà | Citroën Saxo VTS S1600 | (Italy) Andrea Dallavilla | Citroën Saxo VTS S1600 | (Finland) Janne Tuohino | Citroën Saxo VTS S1600 | 6 |
| 2003 | FIA Junior World Rally Championship | 29 | (France) Brice Tirabassi | Renault Clio S1600 | (Spain) Salvador Cañellas Jr. | Suzuki Ignis S1600 | (Sweden) Daniel Carlsson | Suzuki Ignis S1600 | 7 |
| 2004 | FIA Junior World Rally Championship | 29 | (Sweden) Per-Gunnar Andersson | Suzuki Ignis S1600 | (France) Nicolas Bernardi | Renault Clio S1600 | (United Kingdom) Guy Wilks | Suzuki Ignis S1600 | 7 |
| 2005 | FIA Junior World Rally Championship | 29 | (Spain) Dani Sordo | Citroën C2 S1600 | (United Kingdom) Kris Meeke | Citroën C2 S1600 | (United Kingdom) Guy Wilks | Suzuki Ignis S1600 | 8 |
| 2006 | FIA Junior World Rally Championship | 29 | (Sweden) Patrik Sandell | Renault Clio S1600 | (Estonia) Urmo Aava | Suzuki Swift S1600 | (Sweden) Per-Gunnar Andersson | Suzuki Swift S1600 | 9 |
| 2007 | FIA Junior Rally Championship | 29 | (Sweden) Per-Gunnar Andersson | Suzuki Swift S1600 | (Estonia) Urmo Aava | Suzuki Swift S1600 | (Czech Republic) Martin Prokop | Citroën C2 S1600 | 7 |
| 2008 | FIA Junior World Rally Championship | 29 | (France) Sébastien Ogier | Citroën C2 S1600 | (Germany) Aaron Burkart | Citroën C2 S1600 | (Czech Republic) Martin Prokop | Citroën C2 S1600 | 7 |
| 2009 | FIA Junior World Rally Championship | 29 | (Czech Republic) Martin Prokop | Citroën C2 S1600 | (Poland) Michał Kościuszko | Suzuki Swift S1600 | (Germany) Aaron Burkart | Suzuki Swift S1600 | 8 |
| 2010 | FIA Junior World Rally Championship | 29 | (Germany) Aaron Burkart | Suzuki Swift S1600 | (Netherlands) Hans Weijs, Jr. | Citroën C2 S1600 | (Bulgaria) Todor Slavov | Renault Clio R3 | 6 |
| 2011 | WRC Academy Cup | 25 | (Republic of Ireland) Craig Breen | Ford Fiesta R2 | (Estonia) Egon Kaur | Ford Fiesta R2 | (United Kingdom) Alastair Fisher | Ford Fiesta R2 | 6 |
| 2012 | WRC Academy Cup | 25 | (United Kingdom) Elfyn Evans | Ford Fiesta R2 | (Spain) José Antonio Suárez | Ford Fiesta R2 | (Sweden) Pontus Tidemand | Ford Fiesta R2 | 6 |
| 2013 | FIA Junior WRC | 27 | (Sweden) Pontus Tidemand | Ford Fiesta R2 | (Spain) Yeray Lemes | Ford Fiesta R2 | (Estonia) Sander Pärn | Ford Fiesta R2 | 6 |
| 2014 | FIA Junior WRC | 28 | (France) Stéphane Lefebvre | Citroën DS3 R3T | (United Kingdom) Alastair Fisher | Citroën DS3 R3T | (Slovakia) Martin Koči | Citroën DS3 R3T | 6 |
| 2015 | FIA Junior WRC | 28 | (France) Quentin Gilbert | Citroën DS3 R3T | (Norway) Ole Christian Veiby | Citroën DS3 R3T | (France) Terry Folb | Citroën DS3 R3T | 7 |
| 2016 | FIA Junior WRC | 28 | (Romania) Simone Tempestini | Citroën DS3 R3T | (Slovakia) Martin Koči | Citroën DS3 R3T | (France) Vincent Dubert | Citroën DS3 R3T | 6 |
| 2017 | FIA Junior WRC | 29 | (Spain) Nil Solans | Ford Fiesta R2 | (France) Nicolas Ciamin | Ford Fiesta R2 | (France) Terry Folb | Ford Fiesta R2 | 6 |
| 2018 | FIA Junior WRC | 29 | (Sweden) Emil Bergkvist | Ford Fiesta R2 | (Sweden) Dennis Rådström | Ford Fiesta R2 | (France) Jean-Baptiste Franceschi | Ford Fiesta R2 | 5 |
| 2019 | FIA Junior WRC | 29 | (Spain) Jan Solans | Ford Fiesta R2 | (Sweden) Tom Kristensson | Ford Fiesta R2 | (Sweden) Dennis Rådström | Ford Fiesta R2 | 5 |
| 2020 | FIA Junior WRC | 29 | (Sweden) Tom Kristensson | Ford Fiesta Rally4 | (Latvia) Mārtiņš Sesks | Ford Fiesta Rally4 | (Finland) Sami Pajari | Ford Fiesta Rally4 | 4 |
| 2021 | FIA Junior WRC | 29 | (Finland) Sami Pajari | Ford Fiesta Rally4 | (United Kingdom) Jon Armstrong | Ford Fiesta Rally4 | (Latvia) Mārtiņš Sesks | Ford Fiesta Rally4 | 5 |
| 2022 | FIA WRC3 Junior | 29 | (Estonia) Robert Virves | Ford Fiesta Rally3 | (United Kingdom) Jon Armstrong | Ford Fiesta Rally3 | (Finland) Sami Pajari | Ford Fiesta Rally3 | 5 |
| 2023 | FIA Junior WRC | 29 | (Republic of Ireland) William Creighton | Ford Fiesta Rally3 | (Paraguay) Diego Domínguez Jr. | Ford Fiesta Rally3 | (France) Laurent Pellier | Ford Fiesta Rally3 | 5 |
| 2024 | FIA Junior WRC | 29 | (Estonia) Romet Jürgenson | Ford Fiesta Rally3 | (Romania) Norbert Maior | Ford Fiesta Rally3 | (Turkey) Ali Türkkan | Ford Fiesta Rally3 | 5 |
| 2025 | FIA Junior WRC | 29 | (Sweden) Mille Johansson | Ford Fiesta Rally3 | (Australia) Taylor Gill | Ford Fiesta Rally3 | (Turkey) Ali Türkkan | Ford Fiesta Rally3 | 5 |
| 2026 | FIA Junior WRC | 29 | (Turkey) Ali Türkkan | Ford Fiesta Rally3 | (Finland) Leevi Lassila | Ford Fiesta Rally3 | (Sweden) Calle Carlberg | Ford Fiesta Rally3 | 5 |

=== Statistics ===
Updated after the 2025 season.

Championships by driver's country

| Rank | Nation | Gold | Silver | Bronze | Total |
|---|---|---|---|---|---|
| 1 | Sweden | 7 | 2 | 4 | 13 |
| 2 | France | 5 | 2 | 5 | 12 |
| 3 | Spain | 4 | 3 | 0 | 7 |
| 4 | Estonia | 2 | 3 | 1 | 6 |
| 5 | Ireland | 2 | 0 | 0 | 2 |
| 6 | Great Britain | 1 | 4 | 4 | 9 |
| 7 | Germany | 1 | 1 | 1 | 3 |
| 8 | Romania | 1 | 1 | 0 | 2 |
| 9 | Finland | 1 | 0 | 3 | 4 |
| 10 | Czech Republic | 1 | 0 | 2 | 3 |
| 11 | Italy | 0 | 2 | 0 | 2 |
| 12 | Latvia | 0 | 1 | 1 | 2 |
| 12 | Slovakia | 0 | 1 | 1 | 2 |
| 14 | Australia | 0 | 1 | 0 | 1 |
| 14 | Netherlands | 0 | 1 | 0 | 1 |
| 14 | Norway | 0 | 1 | 0 | 1 |
| 14 | Paraguay | 0 | 1 | 0 | 1 |
| 14 | Poland | 0 | 1 | 0 | 1 |
| 19 | Turkey | 0 | 0 | 2 | 2 |
| 20 | Bulgaria | 0 | 0 | 1 | 1 |
| Totals (20 entries) | | 25 | 25 | 25 | 75 |

Driver championships by manufacturer

| Rank | Manufacturer | Gold | Silver | Bronze | Total |
|---|---|---|---|---|---|
| 1 | (United Kingdom) Ford | 12 | 12 | 13 | 37 |
| 2 | (France) Citroën | 8 | 7 | 7 | 22 |
| 3 | (Japan) Suzuki | 3 | 4 | 5 | 12 |
| 4 | (France) Renault | 2 | 1 | 1 | 4 |
| 5 | (Italy) Fiat | 0 | 1 | 0 | 1 |
| Totals (5 entries) | | 25 | 25 | 26 | 76 |

Round wins by driver

| | Driver | Total |
|---|---|---|
| 1 | (Czech Republic) Martin Prokop | 9 |
| 2 | (Sweden) Per-Gunnar Andersson | 8 |
| 3 | (France) Quentin Gilbert | 5 |
| 3 | (Sweden) Tom Kristensson | 5 |
| 3 | (France) Sébastien Loeb | 5 |
| 3 | (United Kingdom) Guy Wilks | 5 |
| 7 | (United Kingdom) Elfyn Evans | 4 |
| 7 | (United Kingdom) Alastair Fisher | 4 |
| 7 | (Finland) Sami Pajari | 4 |
| 7 | (Spain) Nil Solans | 4 |
| 7 | (Spain) Dani Sordo | 4 |
| 7 | (Romania) Simone Tempestini | 4 |
| 7 | (France) Brice Tirabassi | 4 |
| 14 | (United Kingdom) Jon Armstrong | 3 |
| 14 | (Estonia) Egon Kaur | 3 |
| 14 | (Poland) Michał Kościuszko | 3 |
| 14 | (France) Stephane Lefebvre | 3 |
| 14 | (France) Sébastien Ogier | 3 |
| 14 | (Spain) Dani Solà | 3 |
| 14 | (Sweden) Pontus Tidemand | 3 |
| 14 | (Australia) Taylor Gill | 3 |
21
| 21 | (Estonia) Urmo Aava | 2 |
| 21 | (Netherlands) Kevin Abbring | 2 |
| 21 | (San Marino) Mirco Baldacci | 2 |
| 21 | (France) Nicolas Bernardi | 2 |
| 21 | (Republic of Ireland) Craig Breen | 2 |
| 21 | (Germany) Aaron Burkart | 2 |
| 21 | (Sweden) Daniel Carlsson | 2 |
| 21 | (Republic of Ireland) William Creighton | 2 |
| 21 | (Italy) Andrea Dallavilla | 2 |
| 21 | (Slovakia) Martin Koči | 2 |
| 21 | (Spain) Yeray Lemes | 2 |
| 21 | (United Kingdom) Kris Meeke | 2 |
| 21 | (Sweden) Dennis Rådström | 2 |
| 21 | (Sweden) Patrik Sandell | 2 |
| 21 | (Latvia) Mārtiņš Sesks | 2 |
| 21 | (Spain) Jan Solans | 2 |
| 21 | (Spain) José Antonio Suárez | 2 |
| 21 | (Germany) Julius Tannert | 2 |
| 21 | (Norway) Ole Christian Veiby | 2 |
| 21 | (Netherlands) Hans Weijs, Jr | 2 |
| 21 | (Paraguay) Diego Dominguez Jr | 2 |
| 21 | (Sweden) Mille Johanson | 2 |
| 21 | (Republic of Ireland) Eamonn Kelly | 2 |
| 42 | (Finland) Andreas Amberg | 1 |
| 42 | (France) Jérémi Ancian | 1 |
| 42 | (Sweden) Emil Bergkvist | 1 |
| 42 | (France) Nicolas Ciamin | 1 |
| 42 | (Belgium) François Duval | 1 |
| 42 | (France) Jean-Baptiste Franceschi | 1 |
| 42 | (Finland) Lauri Joona | 1 |
| 42 | (Estonia) Romet Jürgenson | 1 |
| 42 | (Finland) Kosti Katajamäki | 1 |
| 42 | (Romania) Norbert Maior | 1 |
| 42 | (Estonia) Jaan Mölder jr. | 1 |
| 42 | (Luxembourg) Grégoire Munster | 1 |
| 42 | (Belgium) Thierry Neuville | 1 |
| 42 | (France) Laurent Pellier | 1 |
| 42 | (Estonia) Ken Torn | 1 |
| 42 | (Finland) Janne Tuohino | 1 |
| 42 | (Estonia) Robert Virves | 1 |
| 42 | (Turkey) Ali Türkkan | 1 |
| Total | | 153 |

== Gallery ==
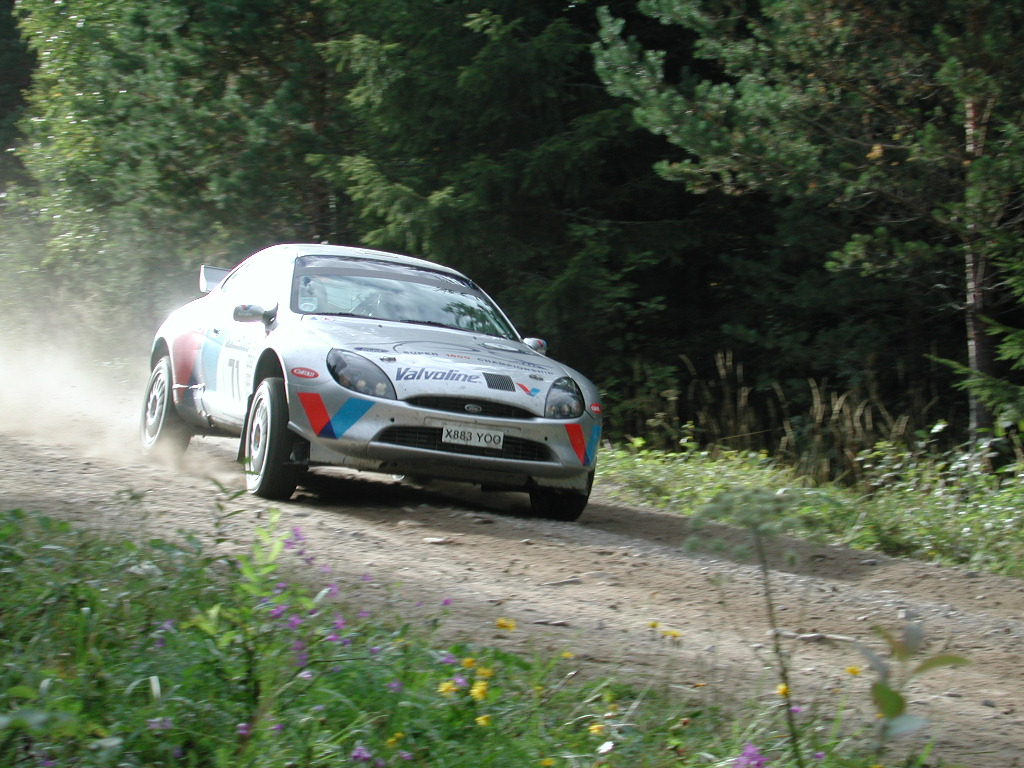
François Duval driving a Ford Puma S1600 at the 2001 Rally Finland.

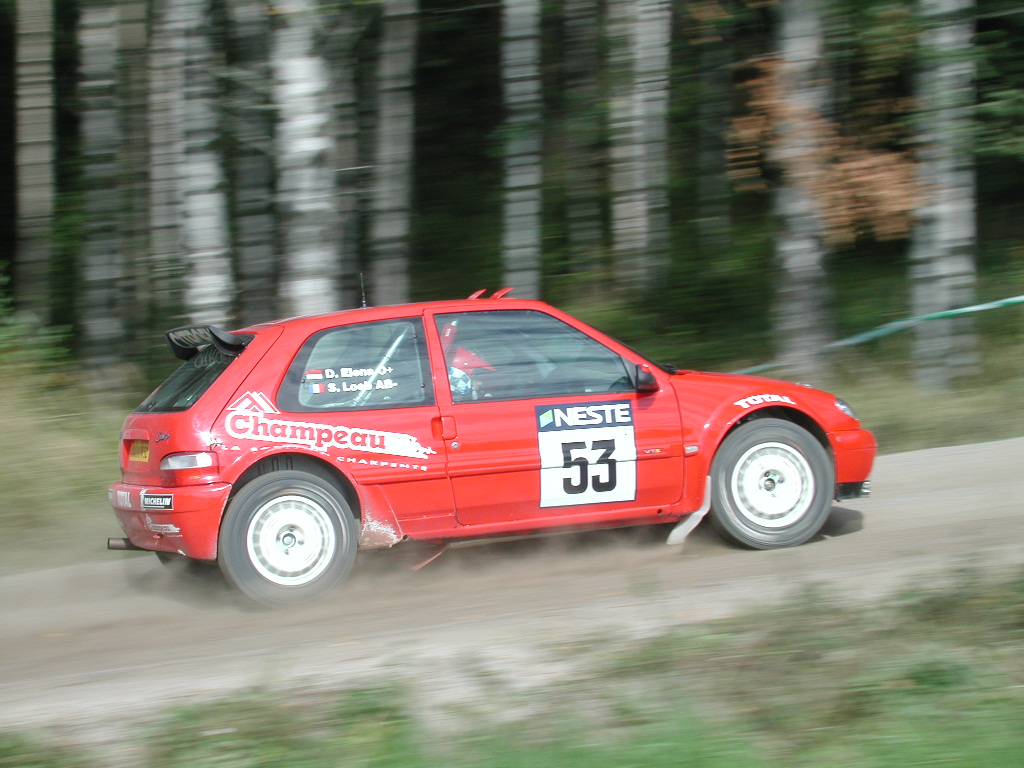
Sébastien Loeb driving his Citroën Saxo VTS S1600 in 2001.

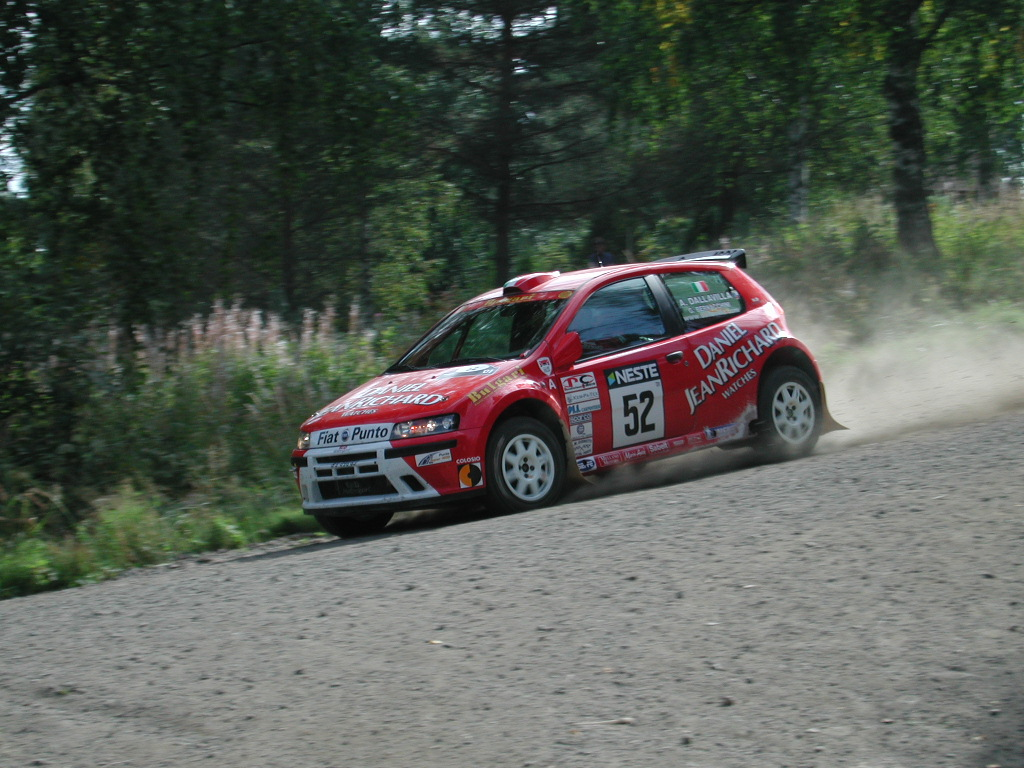
Fiat Punto S1600 at the 2001 Rally Finland.

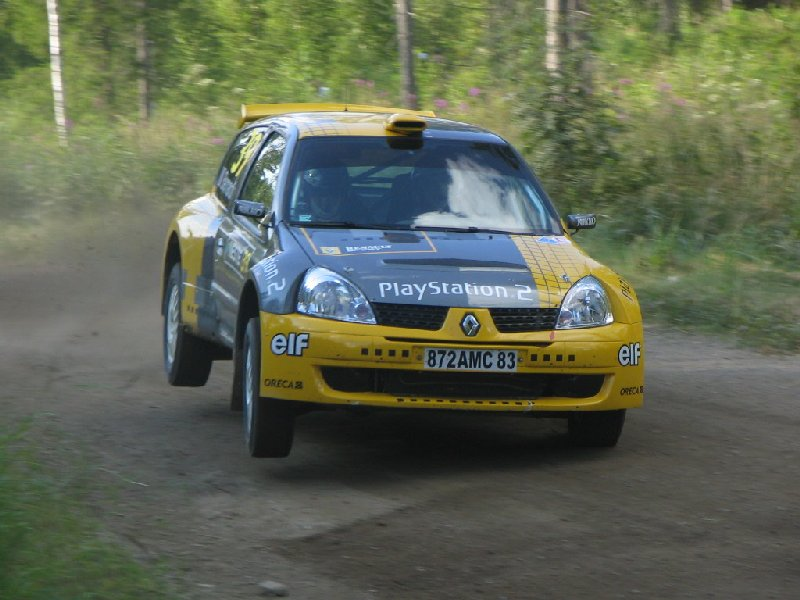
Renault Clio S1600 at the 2004 Rally Finland.

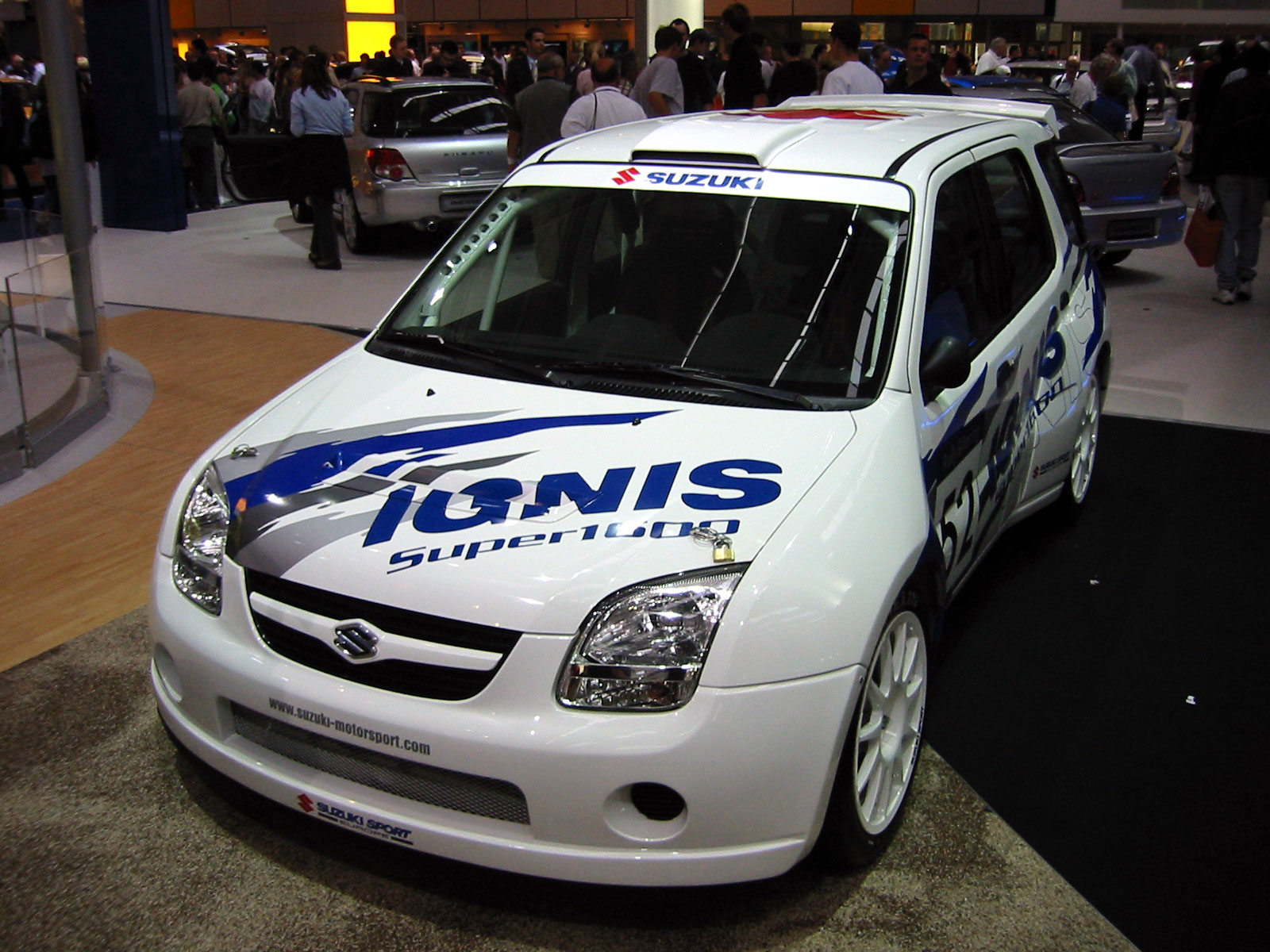
2004 Suzuki Ignis S1600 at an auto show in 2003.

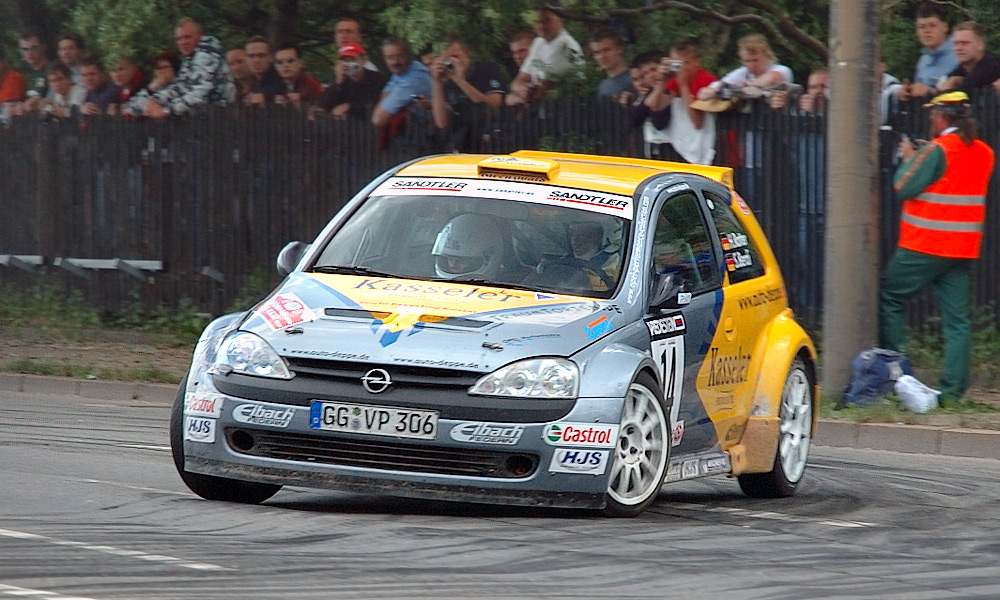
Opel Corsa S1600 driven in 2005.

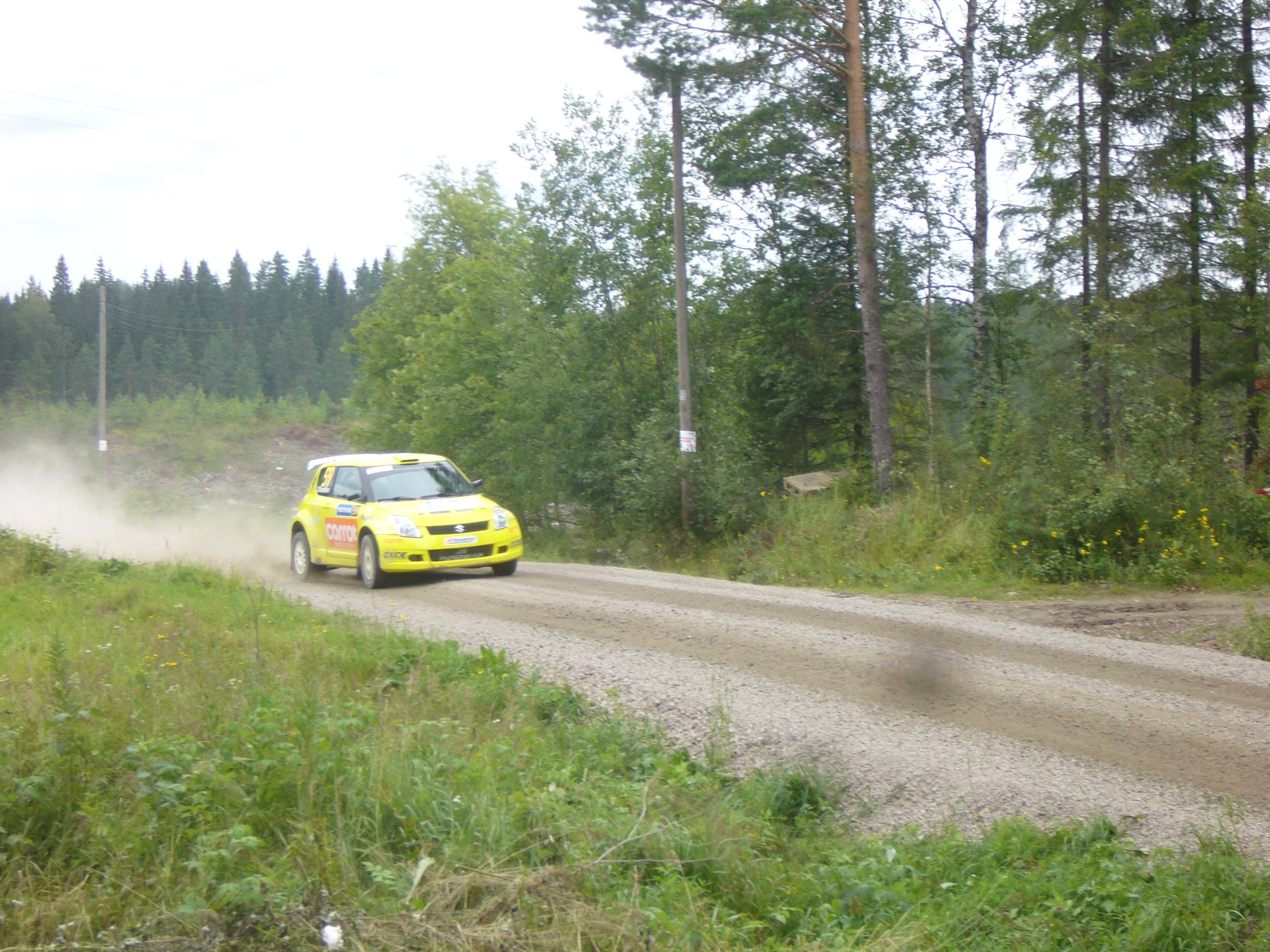
Suzuki Swift S1600 at the 2007 Rally Finland.

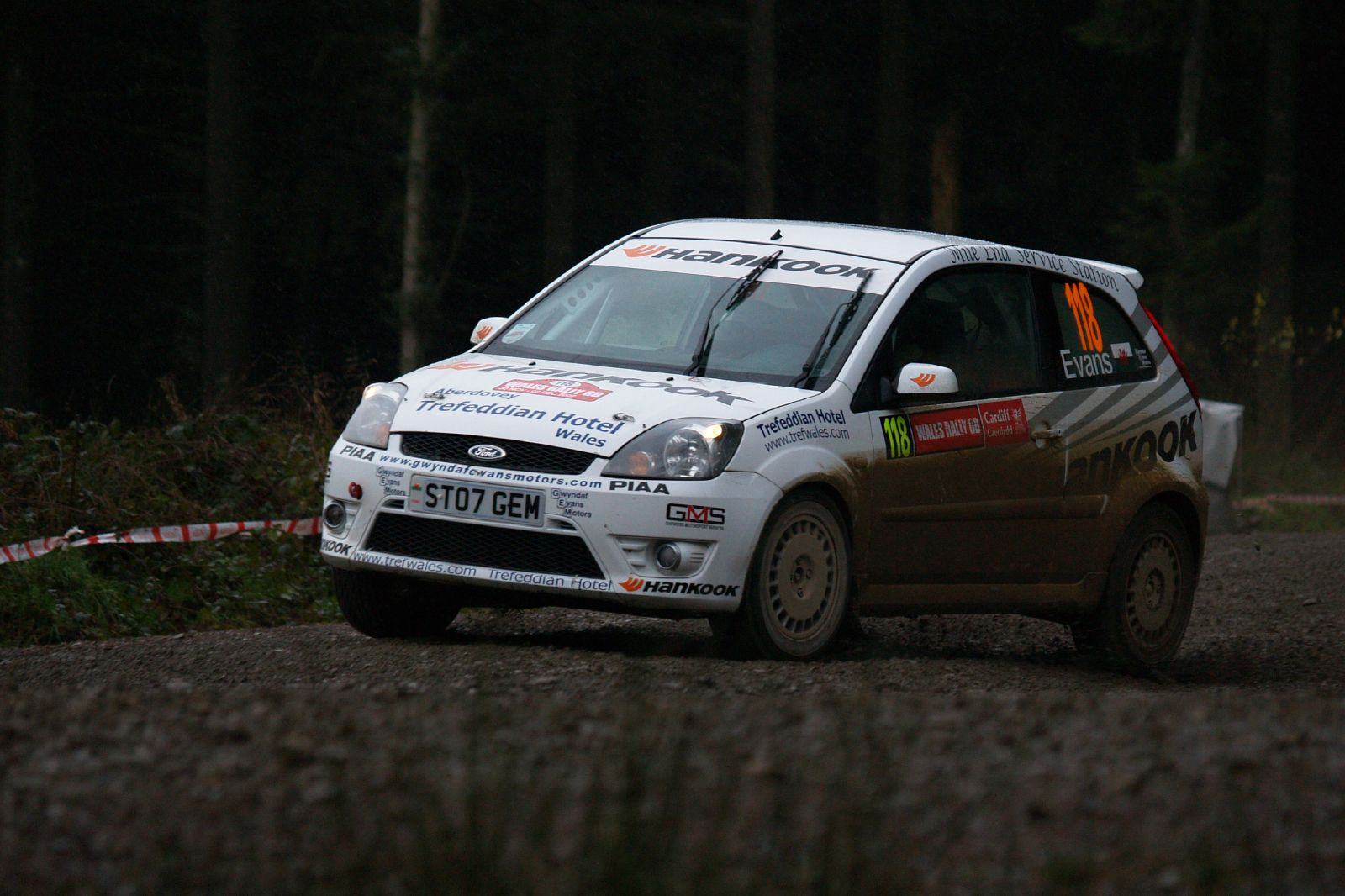
Ford Fiesta ST at the 2007 Wales Rally GB.

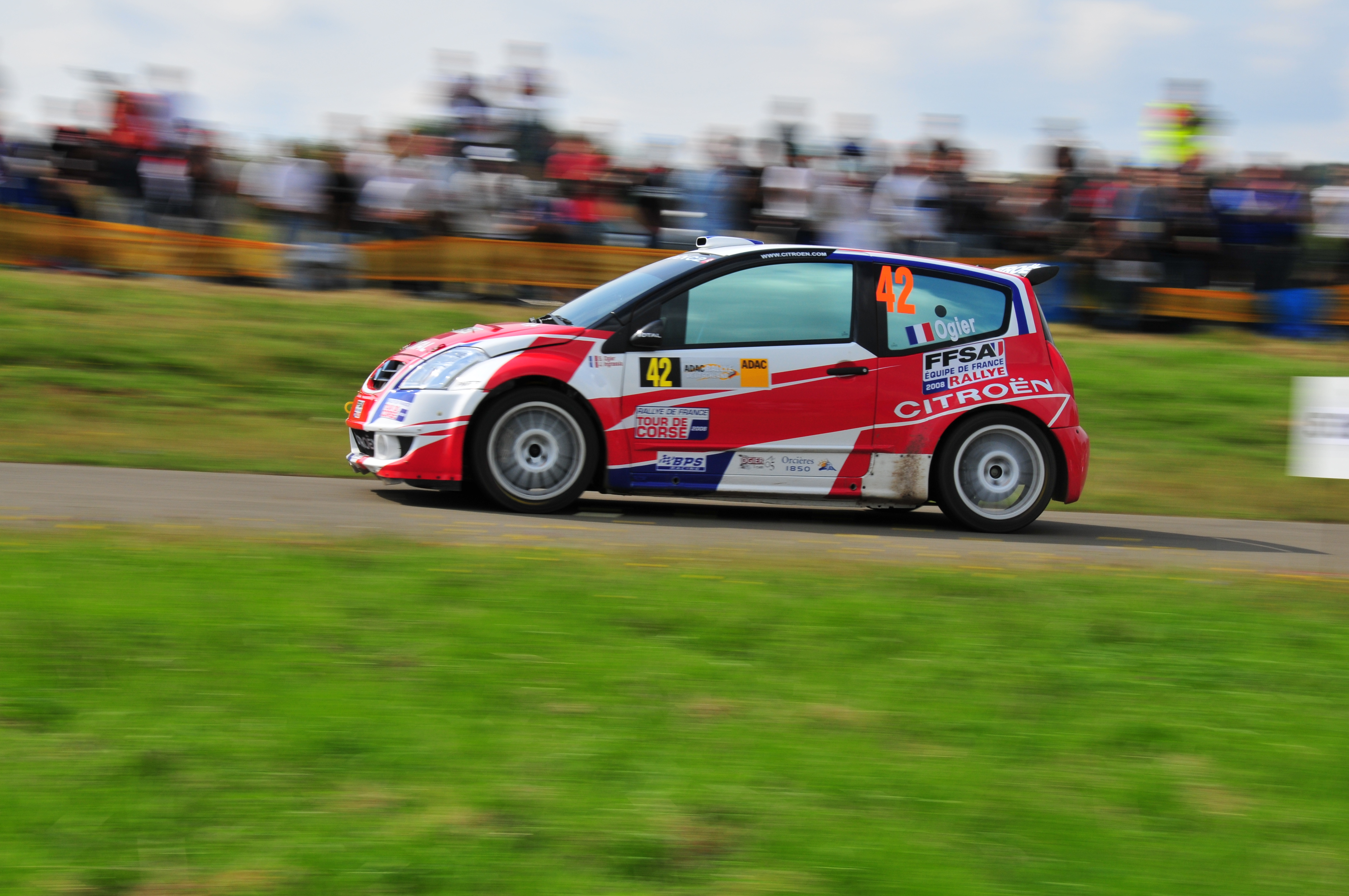
Sébastien Ogier with a Citroën C2 S1600 in 2008 Rallye Deutschland.

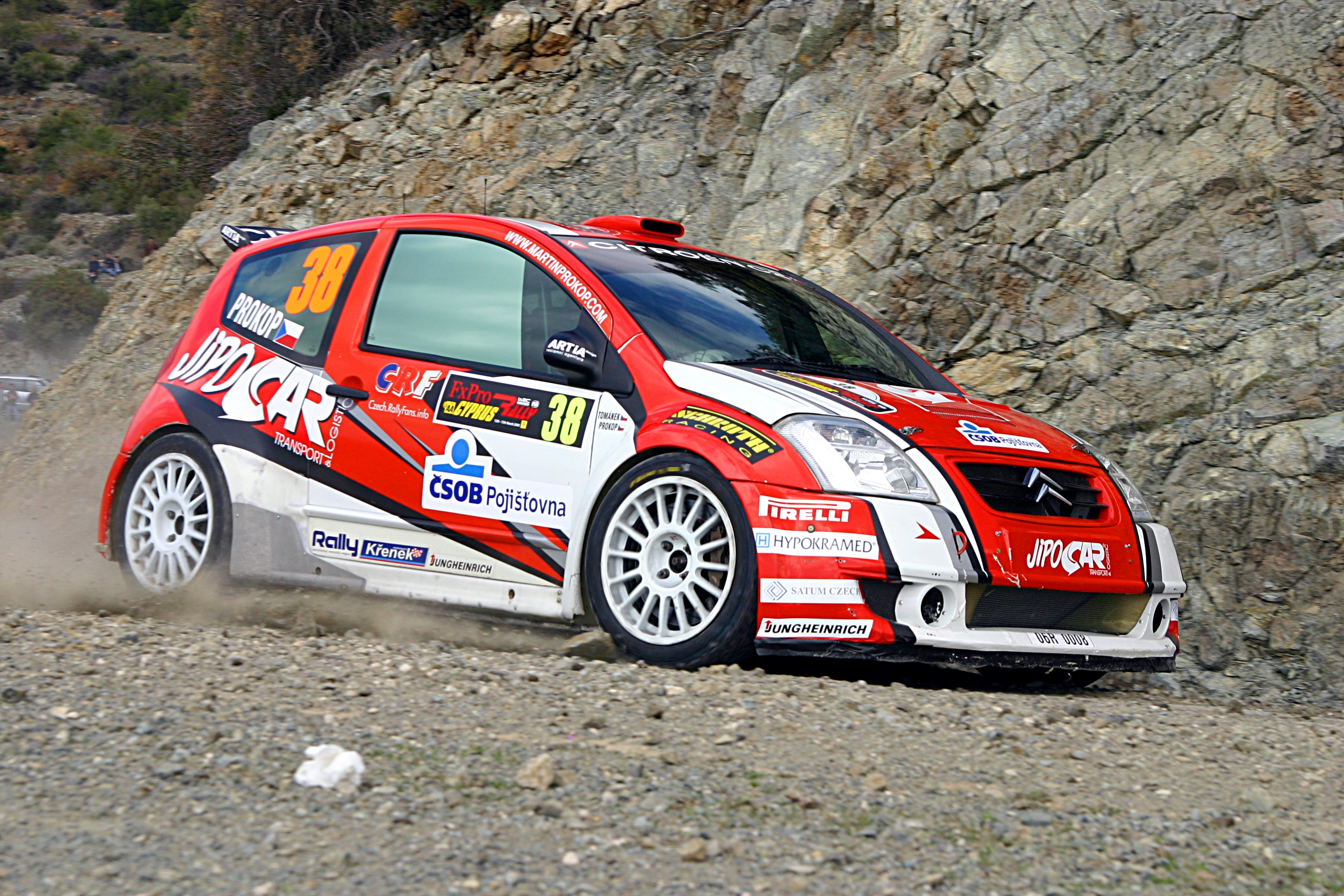
Martin Prokop with a Citroën C2 S1600 at the 2009 Cyprus Rally.

== See also ==
- WRC2
- WRC3
- Production World Rally Championship
- Super 2000 World Rally Championship
