= Ford Taurus =

Car models by Ford (1986–2019)

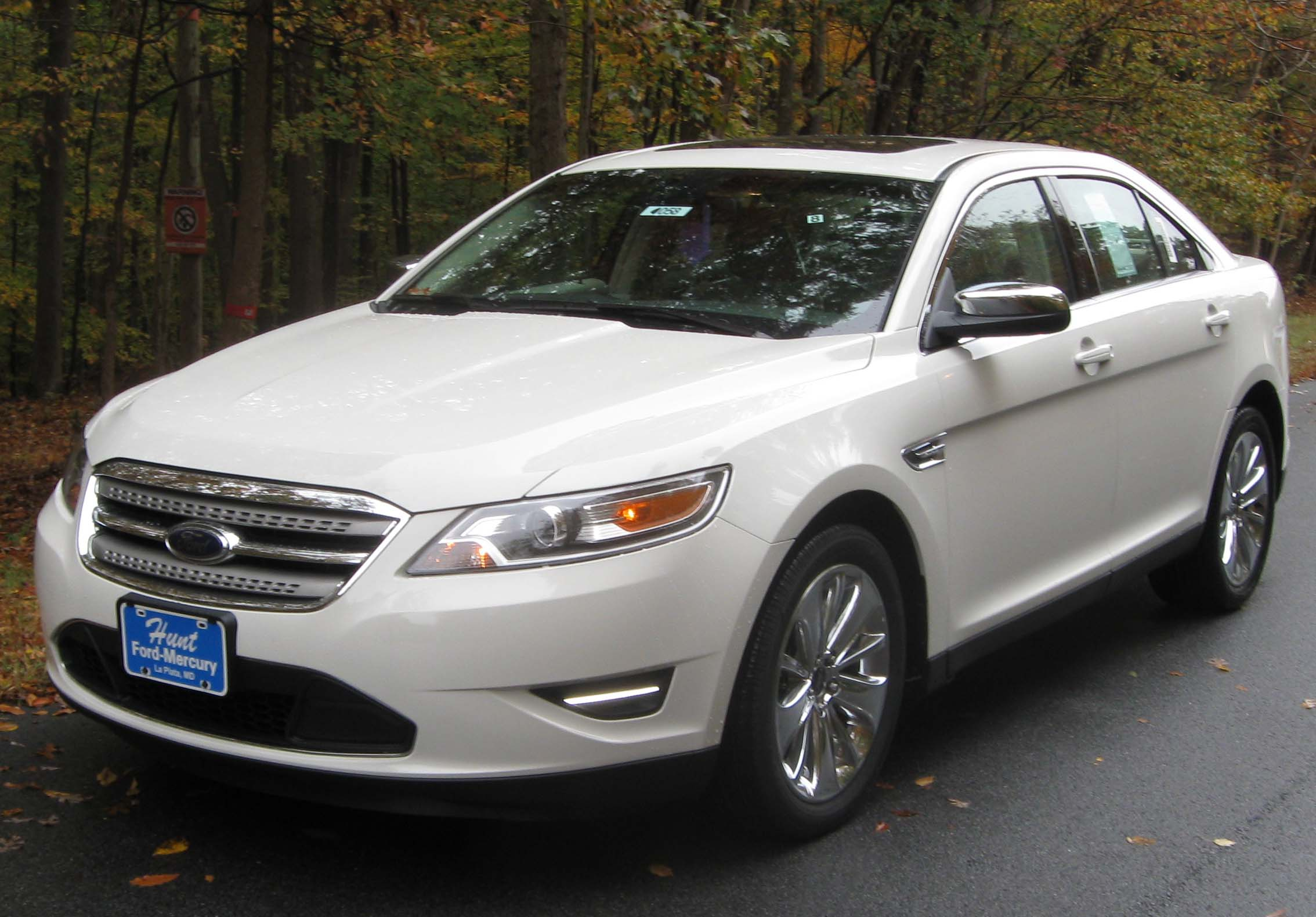
- 2010 Ford Taurus Limited

Overview
- Manufacturer: Ford
- Production: October 1985 – October 2006; May 2007 – March 2019
- Model years: 1986–2019 (2007 sold only to fleets)

Body and chassis
- Class: Mid-size car (1985–2007); Full-size car (2007–2019)
- Layout: Transverse front-engine, front-wheel drive Transverse front-engine, all-wheel drive (2008–2019)

Chronology
- Predecessor: Ford LTD (for mid-size)
- Successor: Ford Freestyle/Taurus X (station wagon); Ford Fusion and Ford Five Hundred (sedan; for the fourth generation); Ford Taurus (China)

The Ford Taurus is an automobile that was manufactured and marketed by the Ford Motor Company in the United States from 1985 to 2019. From 1985 to 2009, Ford marketed the Taurus alongside its rebadged variant, the Mercury Sable. Four generations of the high-performance version (named the Ford Taurus SHO) were also manufactured from 1988 to 1999 and 2009 to 2019.

The original Taurus was a milestone for Ford and the American automotive industry, as the first automobile at Ford designed and manufactured using the statistical process control ideas brought to Ford by W. Edwards Deming, a prominent statistician consulted by Ford to bring a "culture of quality" to the enterprise. The Taurus had an influential design that introduced new features and innovations.

In the late 1990s and early 2000s, sales of the Taurus declined as it lost market share to Japanese mid-size sedans and as Ford shifted resources towards developing SUVs. The Taurus was withdrawn after the 2007 model year, with production ending on October 27, 2006. As part of a model line revision, the Taurus and the larger Ford Crown Victoria were to be replaced with the full-size Five Hundred and mid-size Fusion sedans; the Taurus station wagon was replaced with the Ford Freestyle wagon, branded as a crossover SUV. During the 2007 Chicago Auto Show, the nameplates of the Taurus and Sable were revived, intended as 2008 mid-cycle revisions of the Five Hundred. The Freestyle was renamed the Ford Taurus X. For the 2010 model year, Ford introduced the sixth-generation Taurus, marking a more substantial model update, alongside the revival of the Taurus SHO; in 2013, the Ford Police Interceptor Sedan was introduced as a successor for its long-running Crown Victoria counterpart.

From 1985 to 2007, the Taurus was a mid-size car, offering front-wheel drive. Initially built on the DN5 platform (renamed the DN101 platform in 1995 and the D186 platform in 1999), the Taurus became a full-size car in 2007, adopting the Volvo-derived D3 platform, offering front- or all-wheel drive. The Taurus was produced as a four-door sedan through its entire production, with a five-door station wagon offered from 1986 to 2005.

All generations of the Taurus were assembled by Chicago Assembly on Chicago's South Side. Prior to its 2006 closure, Atlanta Assembly also produced both the Taurus and Sable. From its 1985 launch to its initial withdrawal following the 2007 model year, Ford assembled 7,519,919 examples of the Taurus. It is the fifth best-selling Ford nameplate in North America, behind the F-Series, Escort, Model T, and Mustang. Between 1992 and 1996, the Taurus was the best-selling car nameplate in the United States, overtaken in 1997 by the current title holder, the Toyota Camry.

== Taurus and the quality culture at Ford ==
The Taurus was the first car resulting from introduction of a new quality culture at Ford. Between 1979 and 1982, Ford had incurred $3 billion in losses. In the spring of 1980, Ford Chairman Donald E. Peterson initiated a new "team" approach to the design and manufacture of automobiles at Ford, that eventually resulted in the creation of the Ford Taurus. Ford's newly appointed Corporate Quality Director, Larry Moore, was charged with recruiting the famous statistician, W. Edwards Deming to help jump-start a quality movement at Ford. Deming told Ford that management actions were responsible for 85% of all problems in developing better cars. Based on Deming's advice, Ford management was charged with primary responsibility for automobile quality. Ford also adopted a quality culture employing statistical process control across all aspects of automobile design and manufacture. The Ford Taurus was the first Ford model resulting from this statistical approach to manufacture. In a letter to Autoweek, Donald Petersen, then Ford chairman, said, "We are moving toward building a quality culture at Ford and the many changes that have been taking place here have their roots directly in Deming's teachings." This new emphasis on quality in the manufacture of the Ford Taurus was reflected in Ford's advertising and marketing. The New York advertising firm Wells, Rich, Greene took on the Ford account in 1979 and Robert Cox was assigned to the Ford account and by the summer of 1981, "Quality is Job 1" became Ford's calling card in marketing. This emphasis on quality was used heavily in marketing of the Ford Taurus.

== First generation (1986) ==
1991 Ford Taurus GL sedan

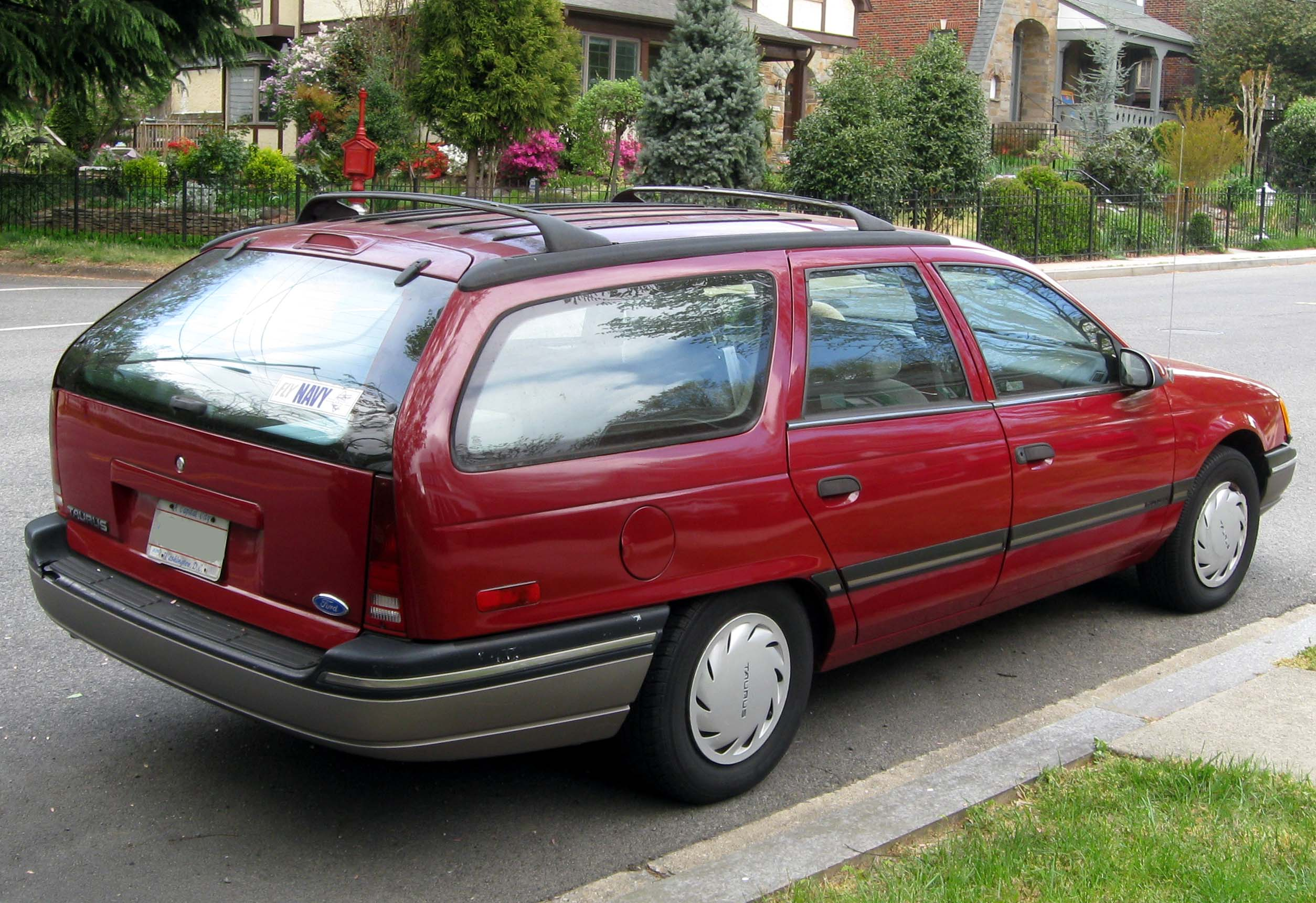
1986–1991 Ford Taurus wagon

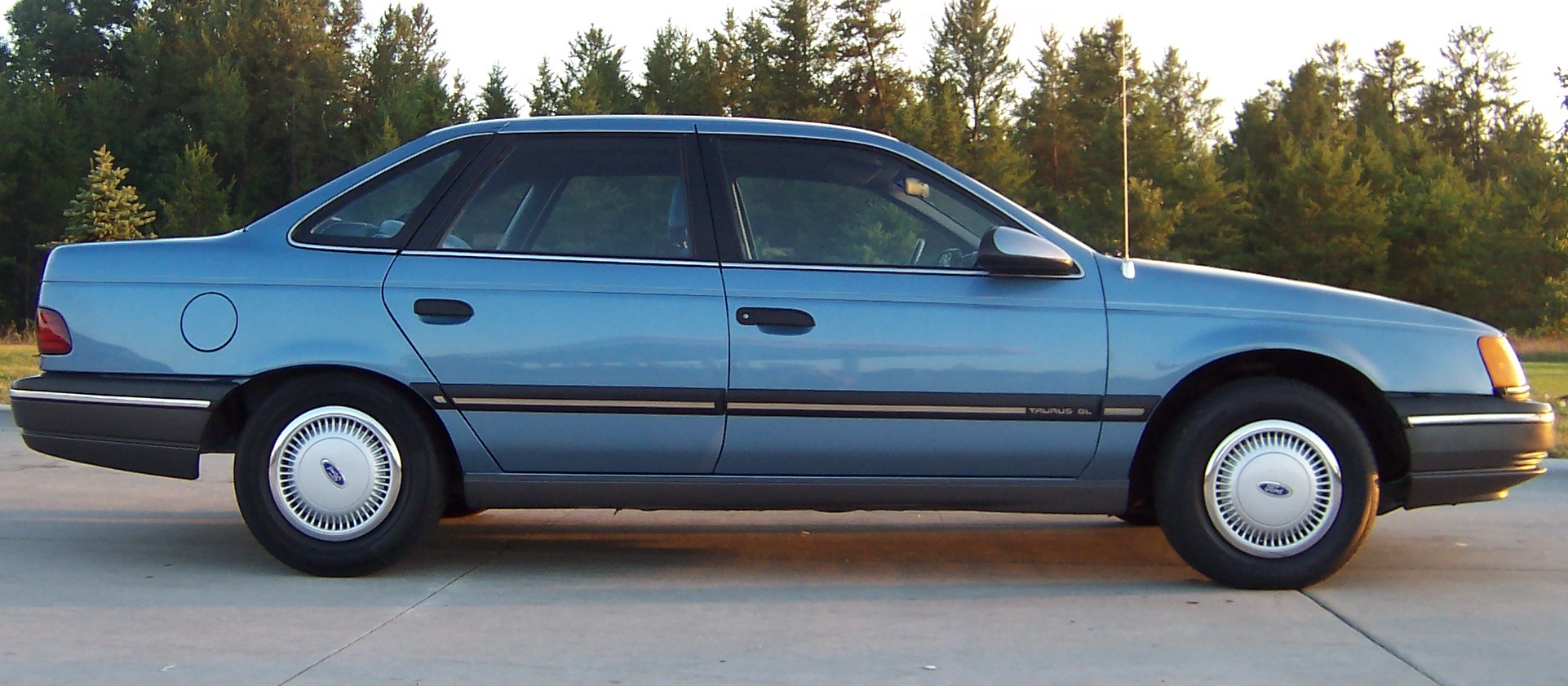
1990 Ford Taurus GL

The first-generation Taurus was launched in 1985 as a 1986 model to strong fanfare and sales, replacing the slow-selling mid-size Ford LTD. (The full-size Ford LTD Crown Victoria remained as part of the Ford lineup.) The release of the Ford Taurus was one of the most anticipated ever, mostly because it was a first in car design and also the start of new quality standards for Ford. At the time of the Taurus's debut, Ford had been producing mainly rear-wheel drive cars, and Chrysler and General Motors were offering more front-wheel-drive vehicles up to mid-range including the Chrysler K platform and A-body Chevrolet Celebrity. With the introduction of the Escort and Tempo, Ford was making a transition to front-wheel drive. The Taurus displayed a rounder shape than its contemporaries, often likened to a "jelly bean" or "flying potato", inspired by the design of the Audi 5000 and Ford's European sedan, the Ford Sierra, an updated appearance of a styling approach used in the late 1940s to early 1960s called "ponton" styling. Instead of a grille, the Taurus mainstreamed the smooth grille-less "bottom breather" nose. The aerodynamic design of the Taurus made the car more fuel-efficient, allowing Ford to meet more stringent corporate average fuel economy (CAFE) standard applied by the United States government. The Taurus's success ultimately led to an American automobile design revolution; Chrysler and General Motors developed aerodynamic cars in order to capitalize on the Taurus's success. It also benefitted from sharing a similar appearance to the limited-production Ford Mustang SVO introduced two years earlier in 1983.

The first generation was available with either a V6 or an inline four-cylinder engine and came with either a manual (MT-5) or automatic transmission. (The Taurus's twin, the Mercury Sable, never offered a manual transmission in any of its incarnations.) Like its exterior, the Taurus's interior was ahead of its time, and many features originating from it are still used in most cars today. Its interior was designed to be extremely user-friendly, with all of its controls designed to be recognizable by touch, allowing drivers to operate them without taking their eyes off the road. For example, the switches to the power windows and power locks were designed with one half of the switch raised and the other recessed so each function could be identified by touch. To further enhance this quality, the car's dashboard has all of the controls in the central area within reach of the driver. The left side of the dash curves slightly around the driver to make controls easily accessible, as well as creating a "cockpit" feel.

The interior offered multiple trim levels, from spartan to luxurious, as well as various seating configurations — e.g., with a traditional column-mounted shifter and front bench seat, with bucket seats and a center console with a floor-mounted shifter, or with bucket seats and a console with a column-mounted shifter. These options were also extended to the Sable and, beginning in MY 1988, the Lincoln Continental as well. Models available with a manual transmission were available with bucket seats, center console and floor-mounted shifter. The base trim level, the L, featured an AM radio and a front cloth bench seat, while the highest level, LX, came with more features as standard equipment.

The Taurus was well received by both the public and the press. In addition to numerous other awards, the Taurus was made the 1986 Car and Driver Ten Best List and was named the 1986 Motor Trend Car of the Year. Production reached over 200,000 for the 1986 model year and the millionth Taurus was sold during the 1989 model year. By the end of model year 1991, first generation production had reached more than two million.

== Second generation (1992) ==
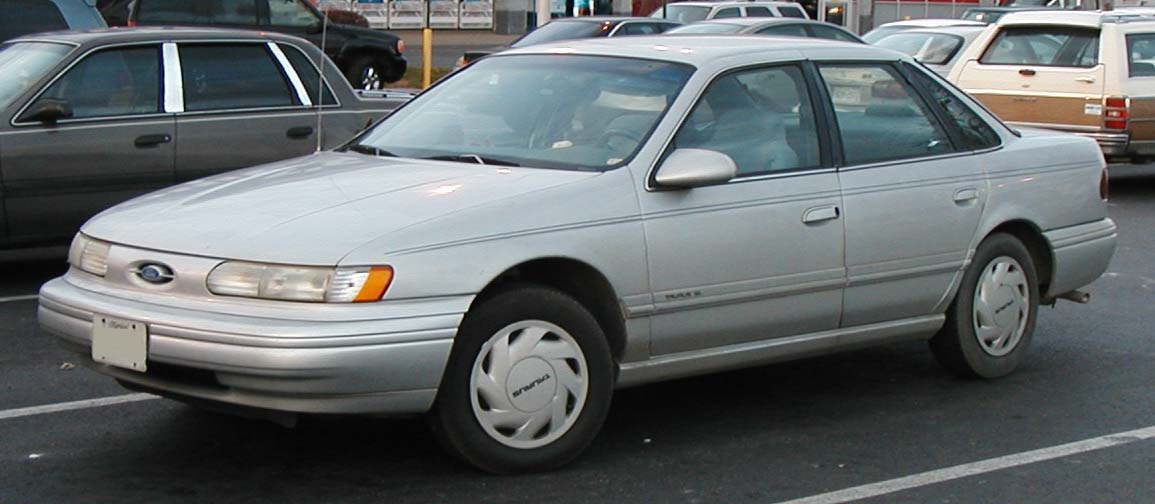
1994–1995 Ford Taurus sedan

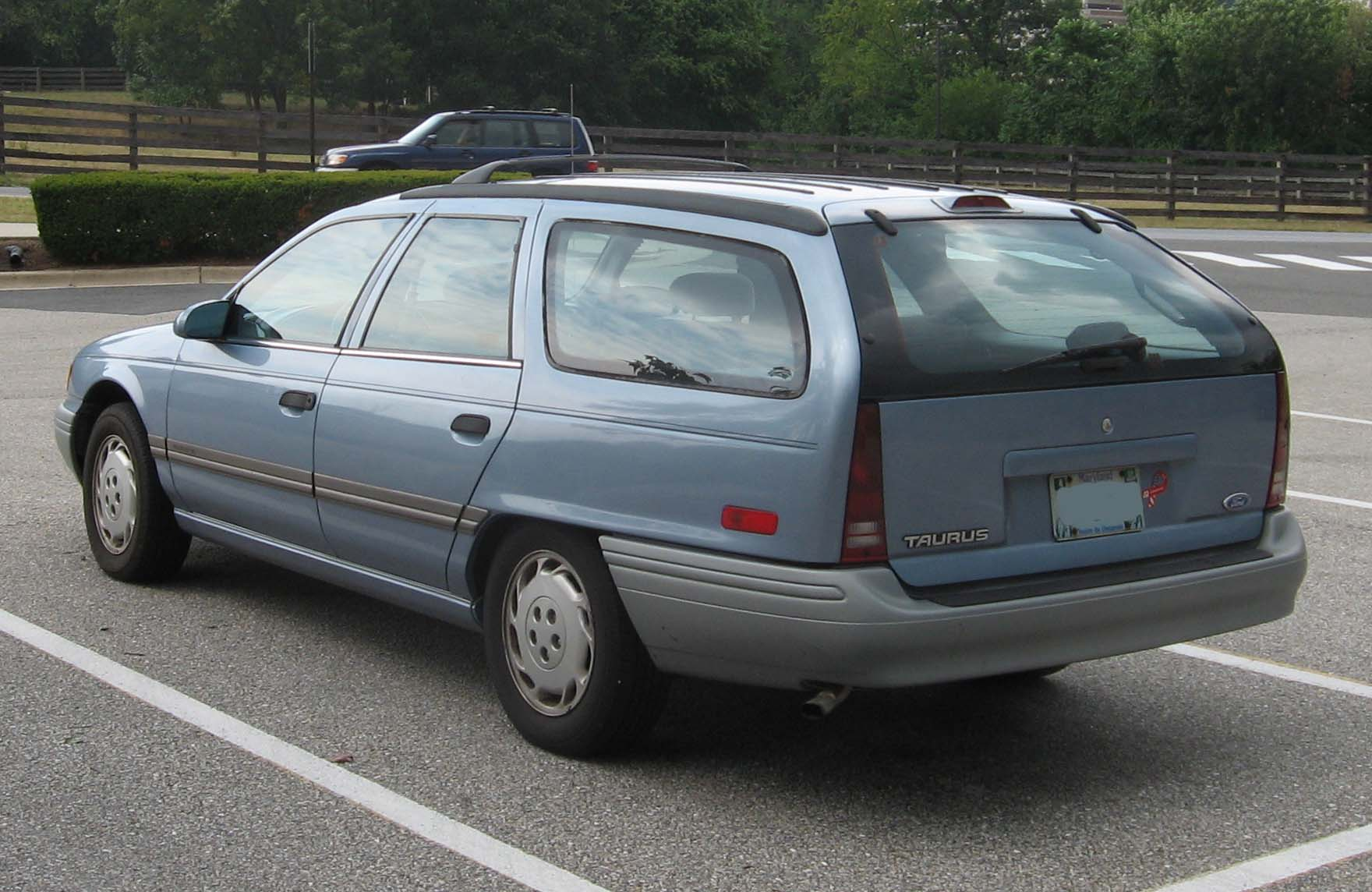
1992 Ford Taurus wagon

The Taurus received its first redesign in late 1991 for the 1992 model year, using the same chassis and with revisions to every exterior body panel other than the doors — largely as major facelift to the first generation design, gaining several inches in length and over 200 pounds in curb weight, and marketed solely with V6 engines and automatic transmissions. The Taurus SHO made its return, with an automatic transmission option joining the manual transmission.

The interior was also completely revised, gaining an optional passenger-side airbag, which became standard for model year 1994 and becoming the first mid-size sedan marketed in the United States with standard dual airbags.

The second generation become the best-selling car in the United States, maintained the title throughout its duration, and reached a production of 1.4 million before ending in 1995.

== Third generation (1996) ==
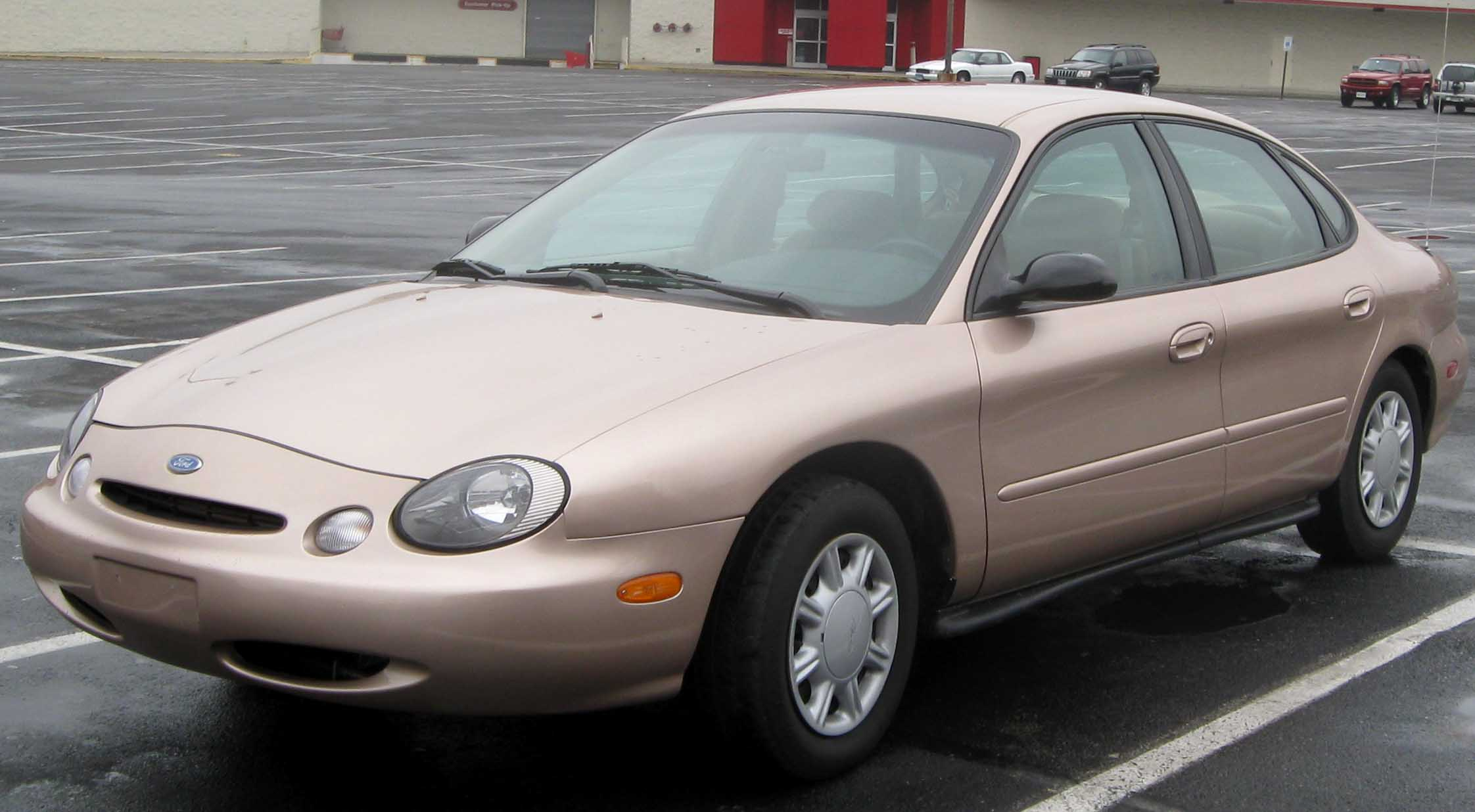
1996–1997 Ford Taurus sedan

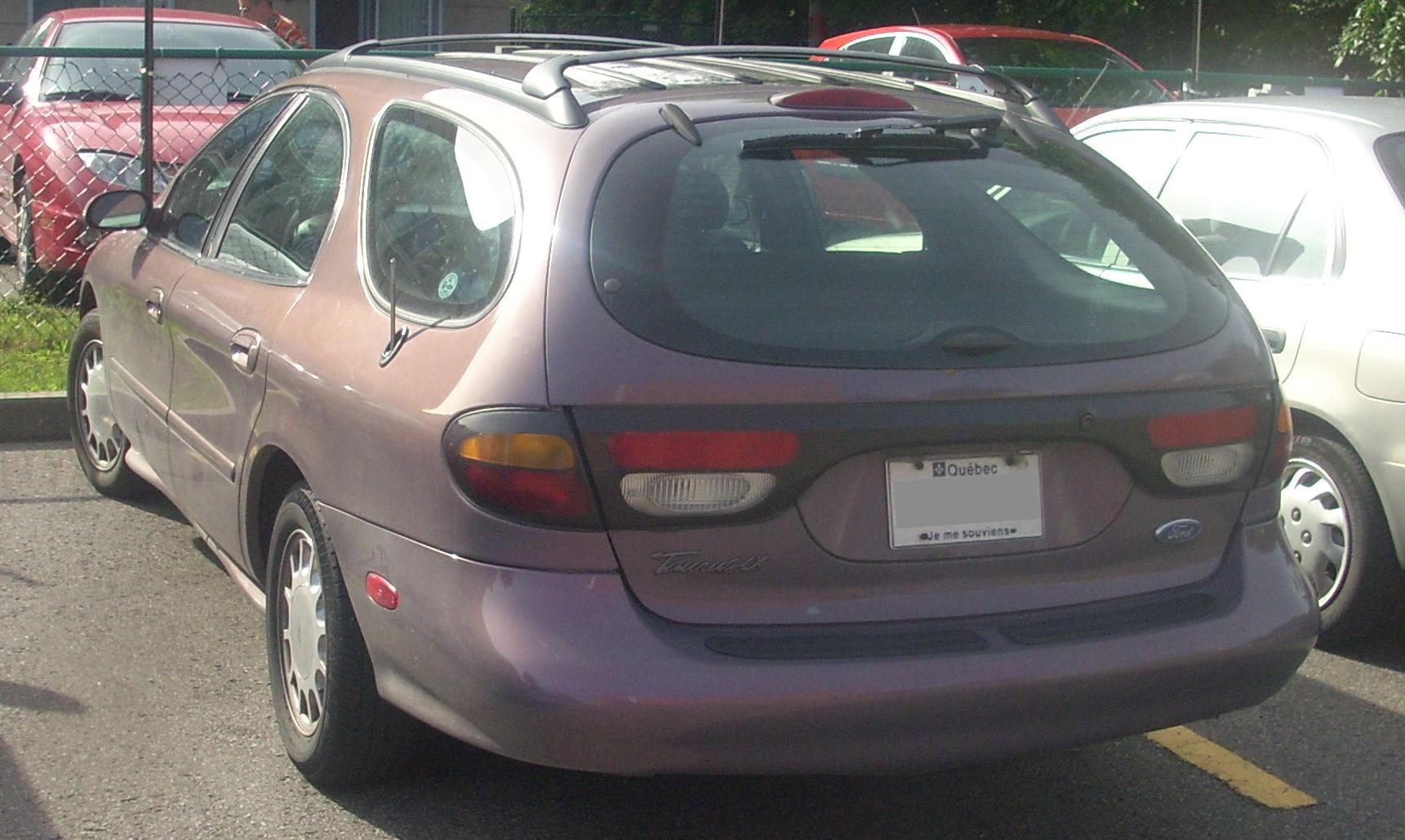
1996–1997 Ford Taurus LX wagon

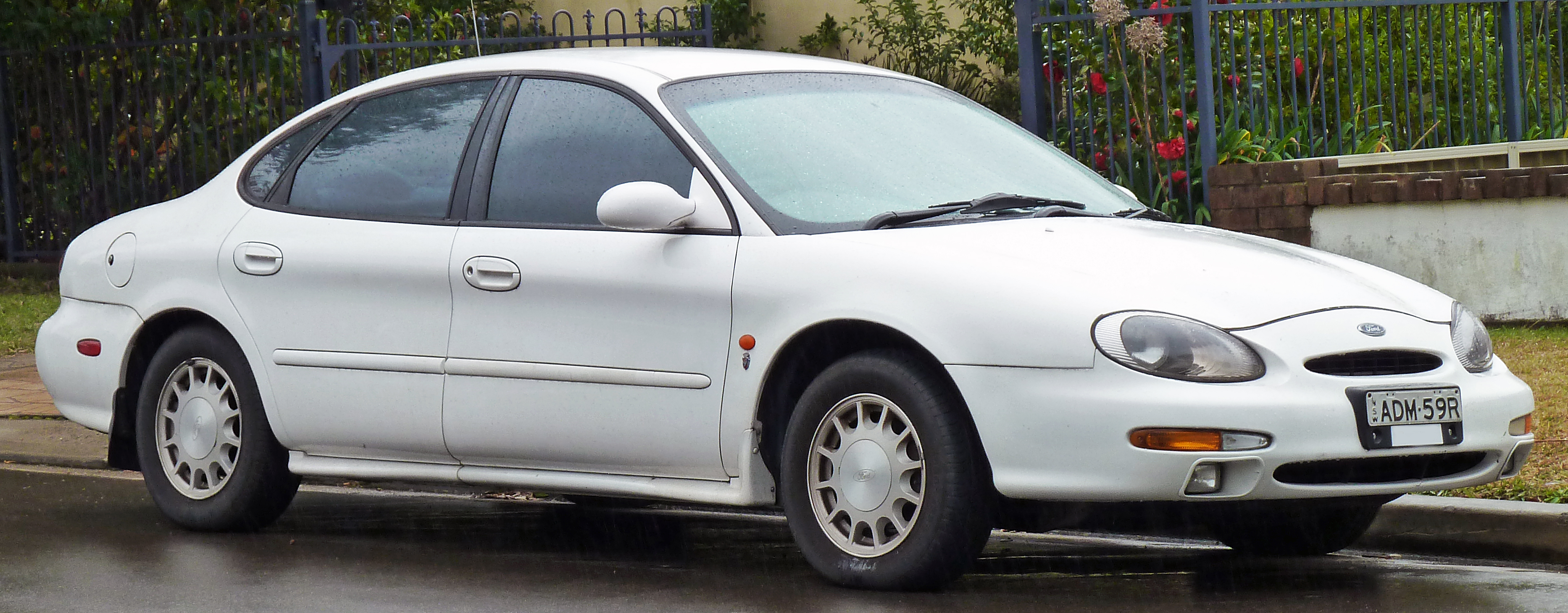
1996–1998 Ford Taurus Ghia sedan (export)

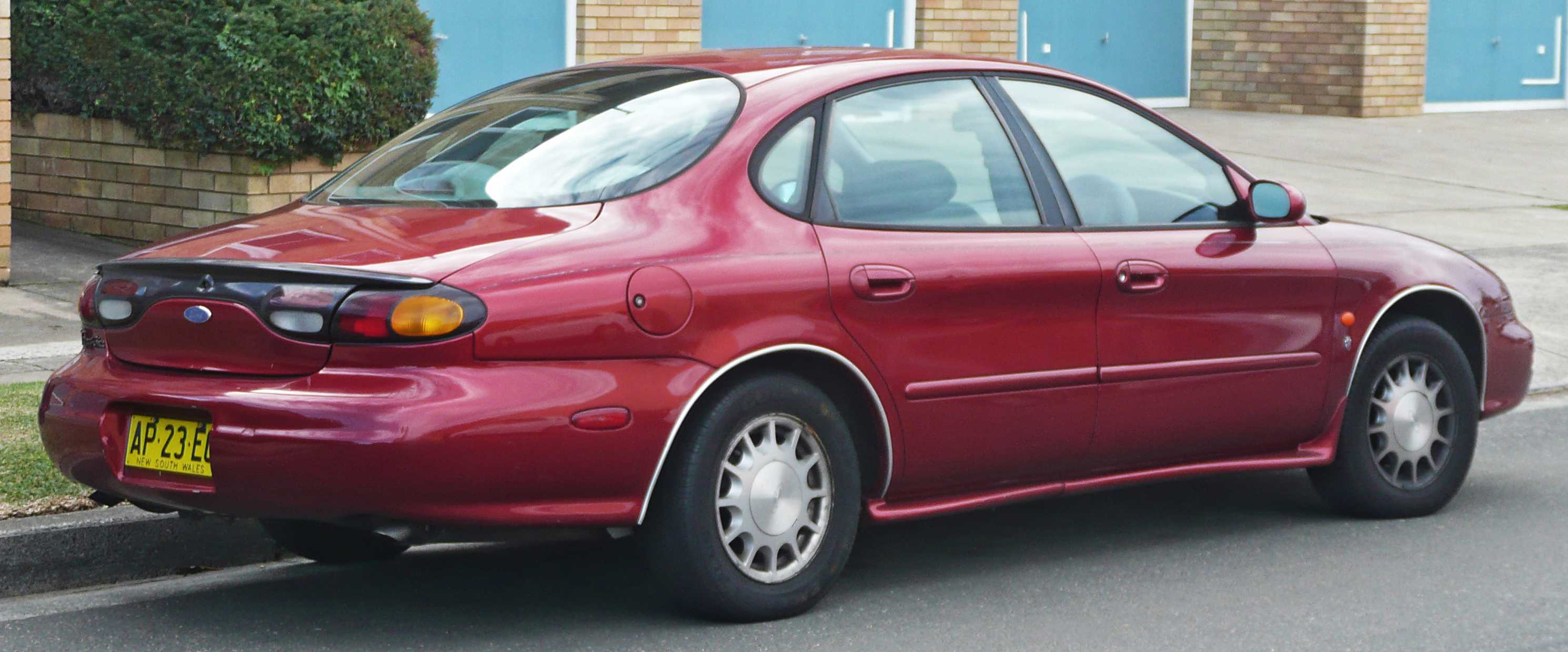
1996–1998 Ford Taurus Ghia sedan (export)

For the 1996 model year, Ford presented the third generation of the Ford Taurus. Although not completely new, the chassis was heavily upgraded, becoming the DN101 generation. Alongside the Mercury Sable, the Ford Taurus shared its underpinnings with the redesigned Lincoln Continental and all-new Ford Windstar.

In 1996, its starting cost was about $18,000 (equivalent to $36,951 in 2025).

In a break from the familiar styling of the previous two generations (that chief designer Jack Telnack had likened to a "pair of slippers"), Ford had sought to again make the Taurus stand out for buyers of mid-size sedans, giving the vehicle a much more extensive restyling than its 1992 predecessor. Moving away from straight lines, the 1996 Taurus sought to include rounded lines, moving past the cab-forward design of the Chrysler LH sedans. Alongside the Ford Blue Oval emblem itself, the Taurus repeated the shape several places in its exterior; in a controversial design element, the rear window of the Taurus was oval, as were the side windows of the Mercury Sable. To allow better differentiation between models, the Ford Taurus and Mercury Sable were given separate rooflines; Taurus/Sable station wagons were fitted with the doors of Sable sedans.

The interior saw a complete redesign. To simplify production, all versions of the Taurus were fitted with bucket seats; six-passenger versions were fitted with a flip-forward center seat cushion also meant for use as a center console, while five-passenger versions were fitted with a floor shifter and center console. To improve ergonomics, radio and climate controls were centralized on an oval-shaped console on the dashboard.

Reaction to the third-generation Ford Taurus was mixed; Ford found that customers disliked the oval-shaped exterior. For 1996, the Ford Taurus continued as the best-selling car in the United States. At the time, 51 percent of all Taurus sales for 1996 went to rental fleets, in contrast to the Honda Accord and Toyota Camry, of which most sales were to private customers through retail outlets. In 1997, the Ford Taurus lost its best-selling status to the Toyota Camry.

For 1996, Ford Australia imported the Ford Taurus sedan as the "Taurus Ghia" alongside its locally produced Ford Falcon EL, but imports ceased after only one year because of poor sales. Ford New Zealand imported both Ford Taurus sedans and station wagons from 1996 to 1998 with success alongside the RWD Australian Ford Falcon/Fairmont/Fairlane.

=== NASCAR ===
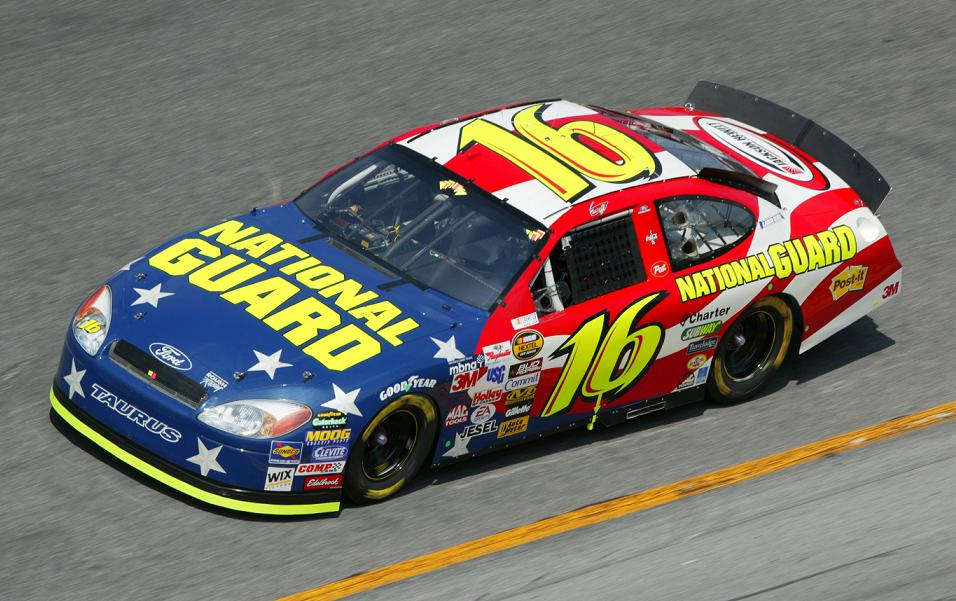
The No. 16 NASCAR Ford Taurus of Greg Biffle

The third-generation Taurus had a presence in NASCAR, replacing the Thunderbird for the 1998 season. The Taurus became the first four-door sedan to be approved for competition. The first Taurus driver to win the Winston Cup (the NASCAR sponsor of the time) championship was Dale Jarrett, who drove the No. 88 Ford Quality Care/Ford Credit-sponsored cars owned by Robert Yates. The first Taurus driver to win the Busch Series championship was Greg Biffle, who drove the No. 60 Grainger Industrial Supply-sponsored cars owned by Jack Roush.

In total, the Ford Taurus has won three Winston Cup championships and two Busch Series championships.

== Fourth generation (2000) ==
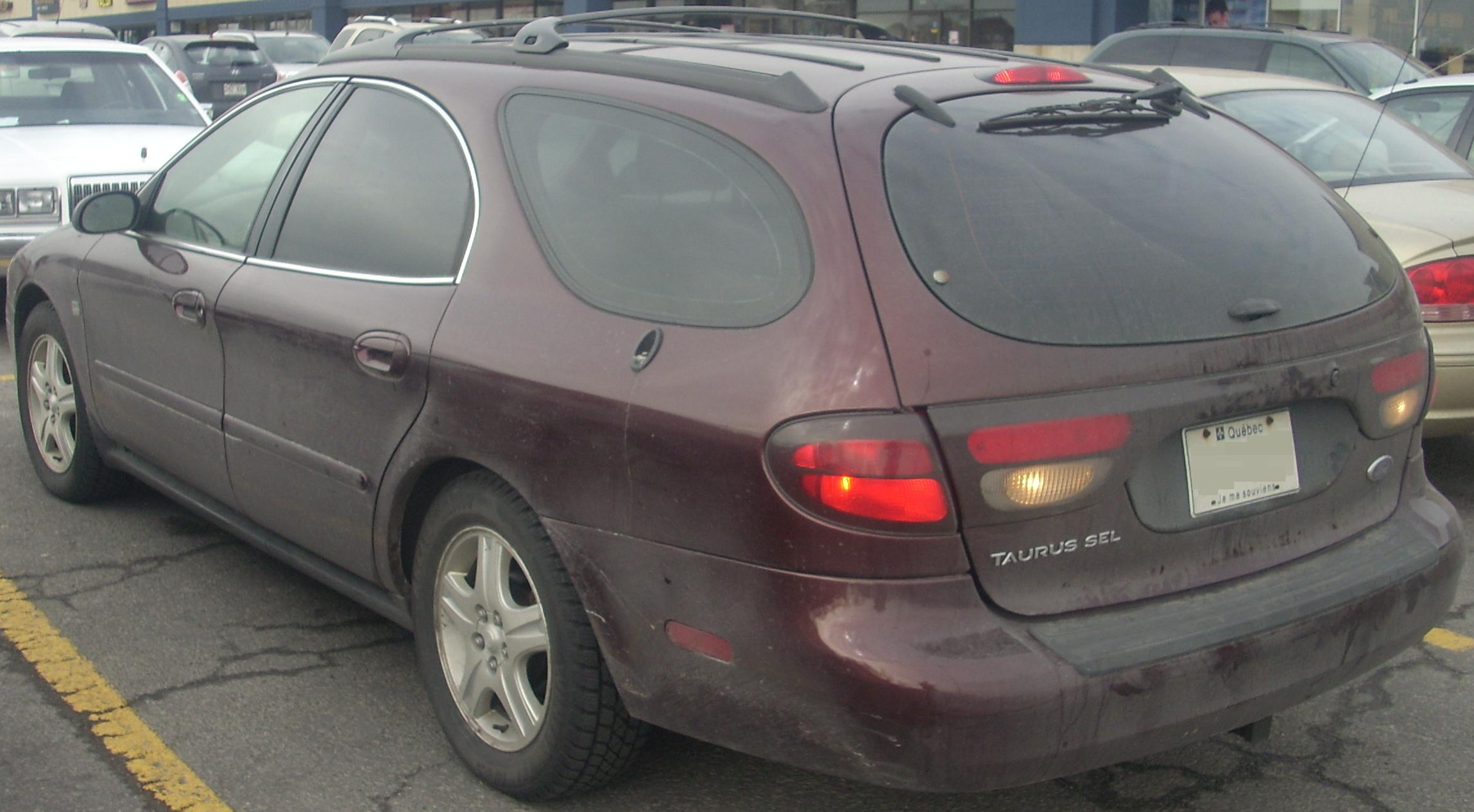
2000–2003 Ford Taurus SEL wagon

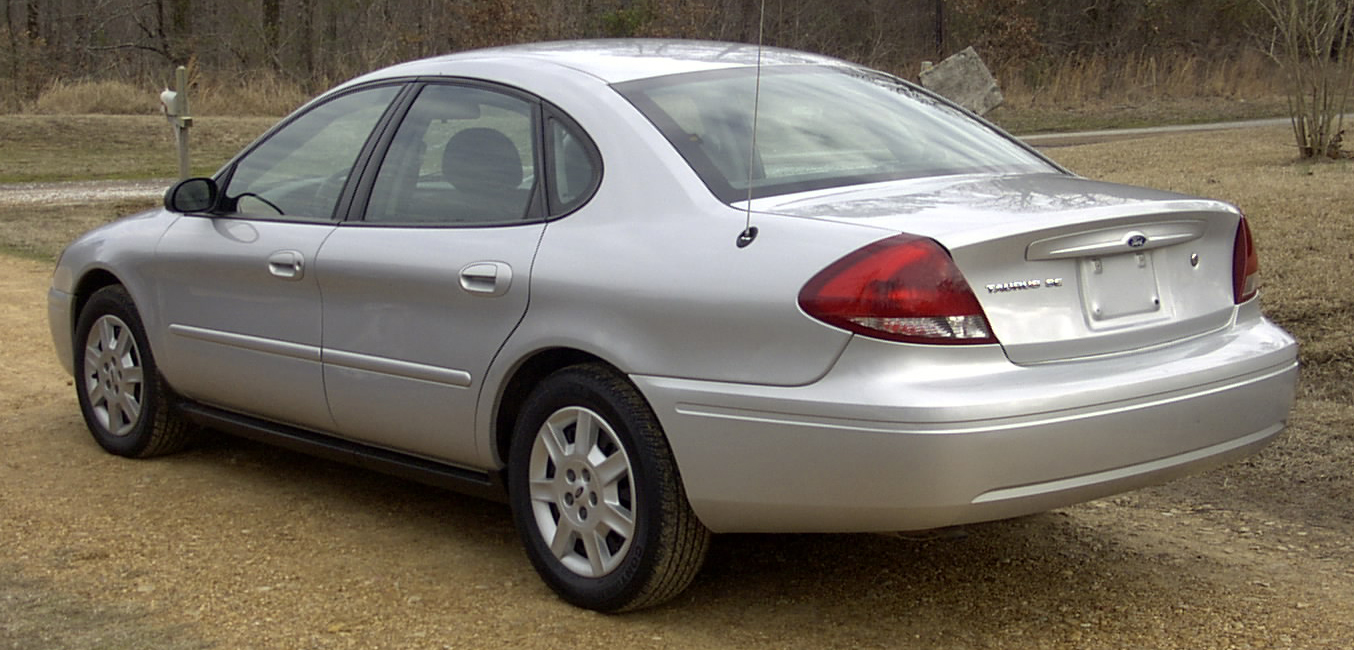
2004–2007 Ford Taurus sedan

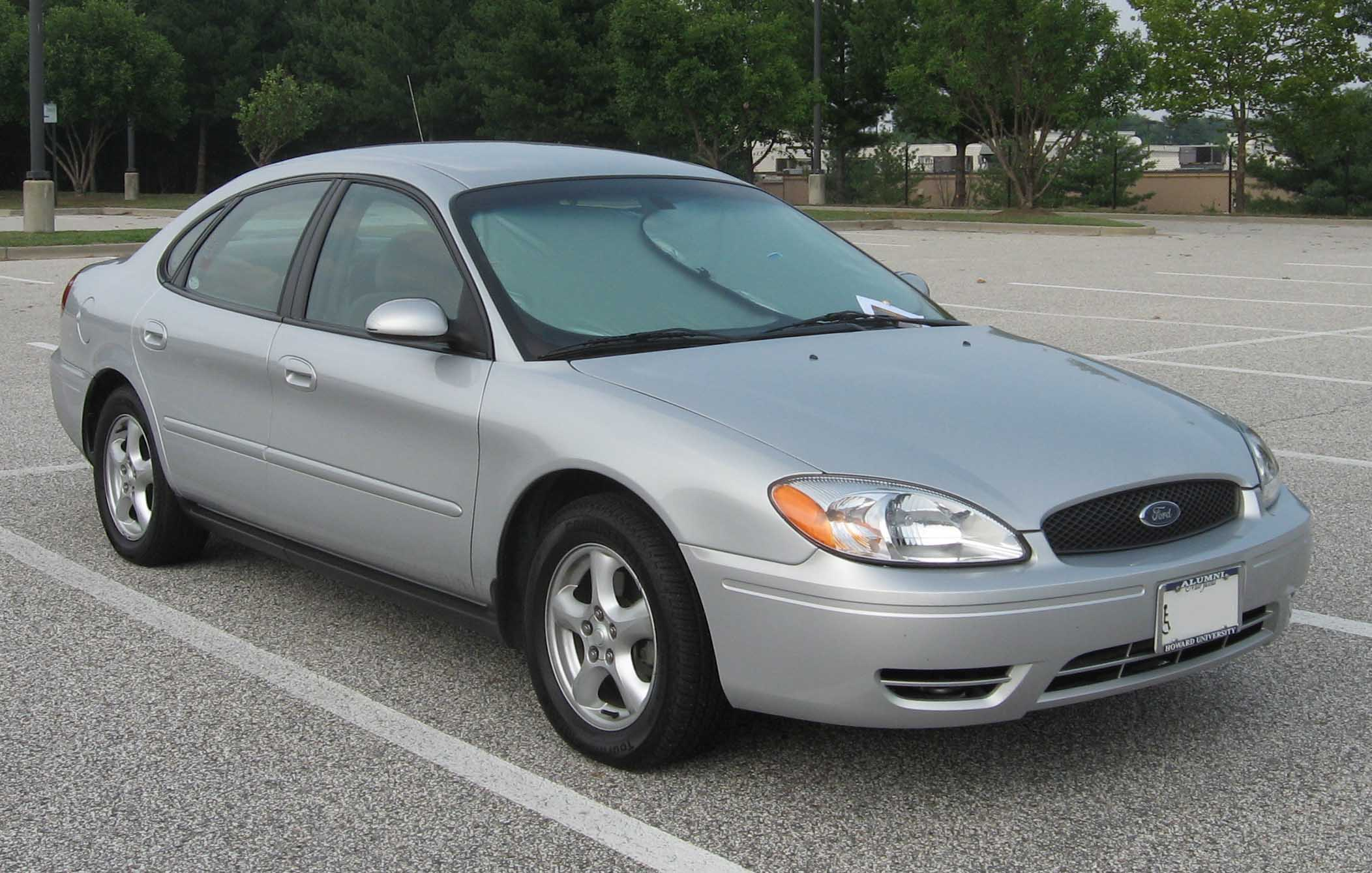
2004–2007 Ford Taurus SE sedan

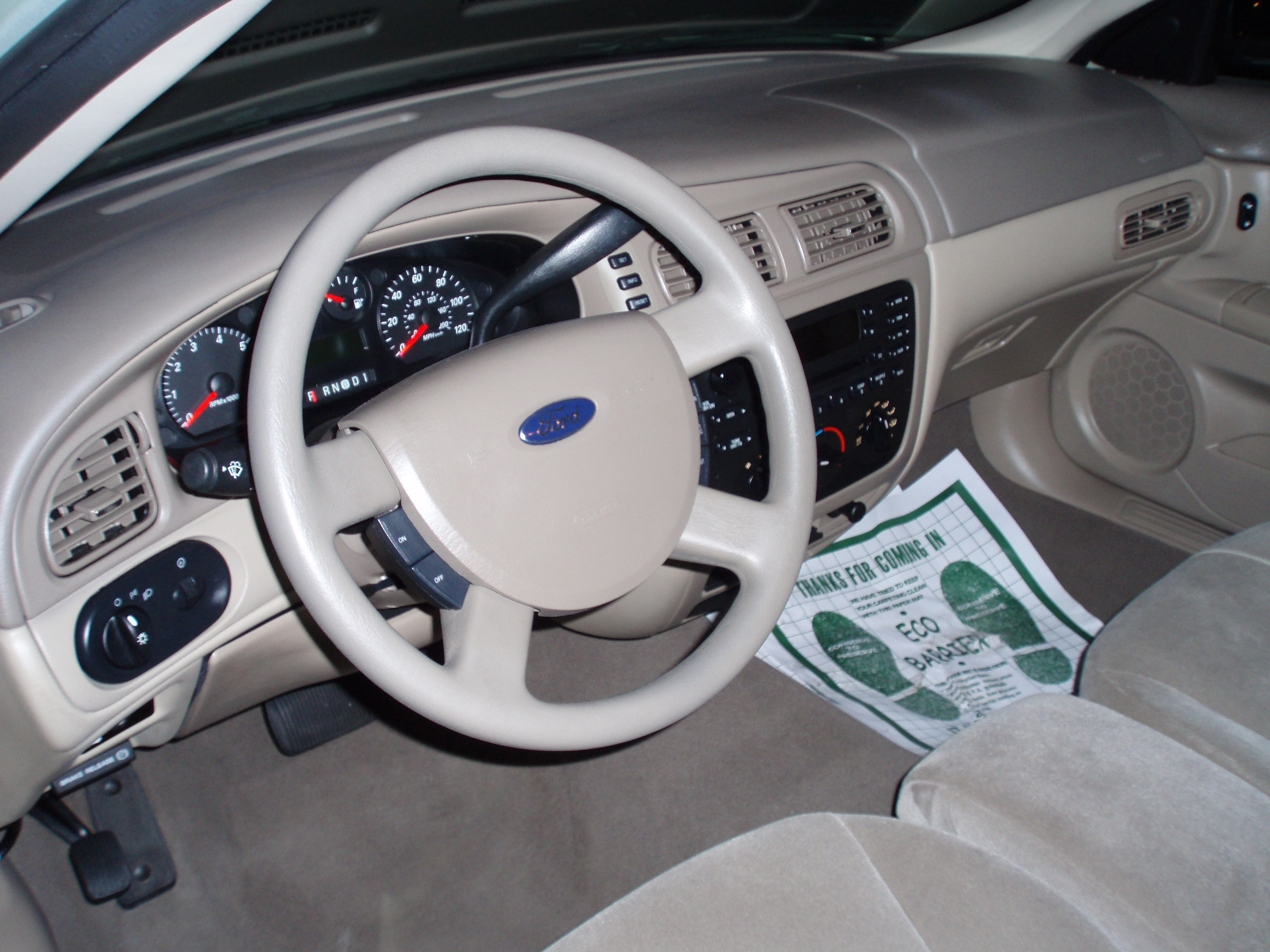
2005 Ford Taurus SE interior

The Taurus received another redesign for 2000, which replaced many of the oval-derived design elements of the previous model with sharper creases and corners, an aspect of Ford's New Edge styling language. To reduce the car's price and keep it competitive, Ford reduced costs on the car in 1999, such as giving the Taurus sedan rear drum brakes on ABS-equipped vehicles (previously, upgrading to ABS included the addition of rear disc brakes), eliminating the dual exhaust on the higher end models, and trimming many other small features.

Ford designed the fourth generation with more conservative styling. Instead of sloping back, the car's trunk stood upright, increasing trunk space by another two cubic feet. The roof was more upright to increase headroom.

The interior was also redesigned with features from the previous Taurus generations carried over. The dashboard was given a squarer design. The "integrated control panel" concept was carried over but redesigned, with a bigger, squarer shape, and it was placed in the center of the dash instead of being angled toward the driver. The flip-fold center console was also carried over from the previous generation, although it was revised as well. When folded out, it now rested against the floor instead of the dashboard, and had reworked cup holders and storage areas. In another change from previous versions, the fourth generation offered rear cup holders that either slid or folded out of the front console, depending on which console the car was equipped with.

== Initial discontinuation and revival ==
During its fourth generation, the Taurus saw a significant sales slump compared to its predecessors. Having already lost its status as the best-selling car in America when it was surpassed by the Honda Accord and Toyota Camry in 1997, by 2005, it had fallen to fourth-place behind the Nissan Altima, which made Ford decide to discontinue the entire Taurus line. Production of the Taurus wagon was discontinued on December 8, 2004; sedan retail sales halted after a short 2006 model year, and the Taurus became sold exclusively to fleets in the United States, while still being sold to retail customers in Canada. Production ended on October 27, 2006, as Ford idled the Atlanta plant, as part of its "The Way Forward" restructuring plan. The last Ford Taurus rolled off the assembly line around 7:00am, destined for delivery to S. Truett Cathy, owner of Chick-fil-A. Mr. Cathy's original restaurant was located across from the Ford Atlanta plant. There was no official event or function of any kind to mark the end of production. The Taurus was replaced in Ford's lineup by the Five Hundred and Fusion sedans, while the Taurus wagon was replaced by the Freestyle crossover SUV.

How can it go away? It's the best selling car in America.

— Alan Mulally, 2006

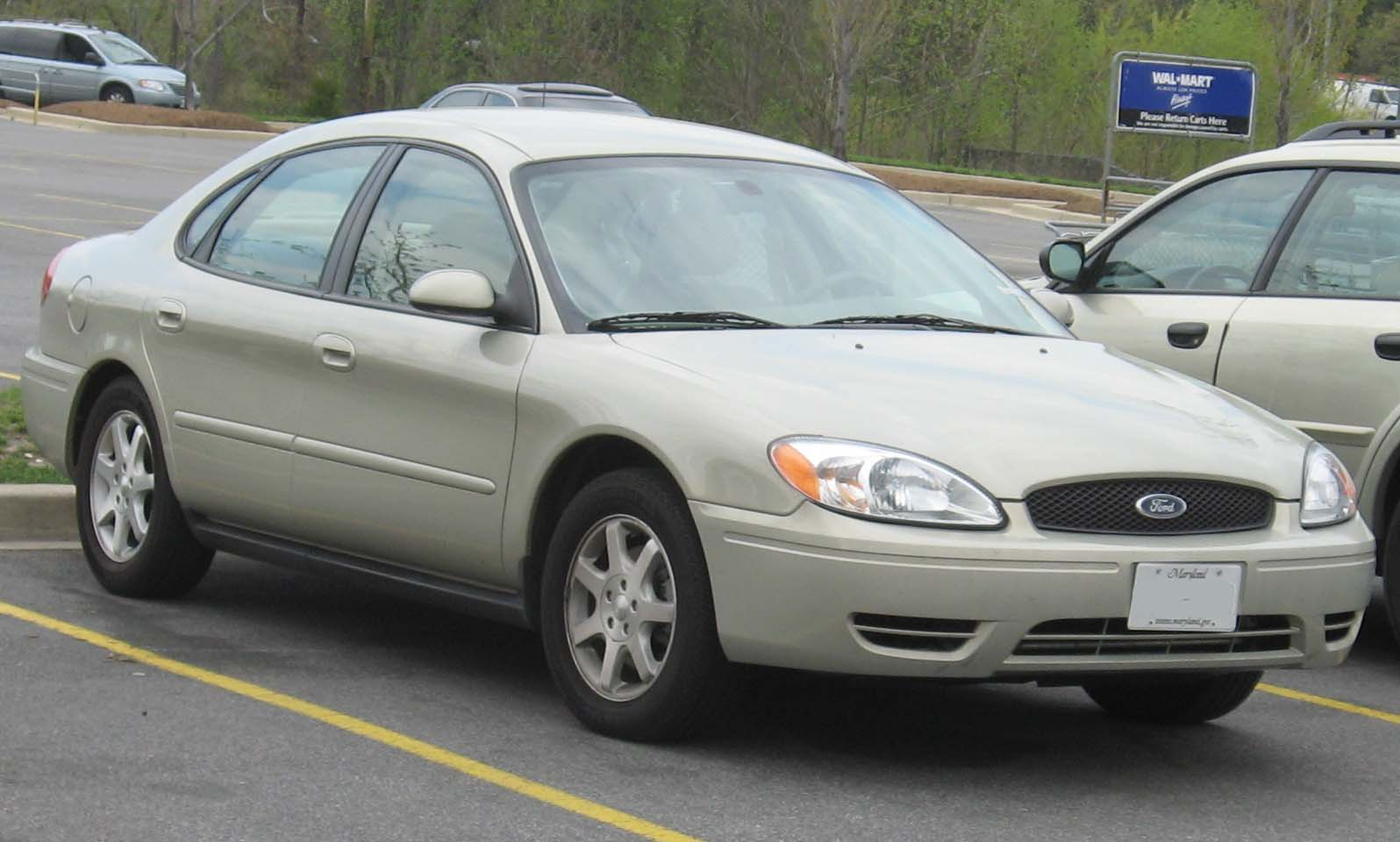
The last Taurus sedan was an SEL model like this one.

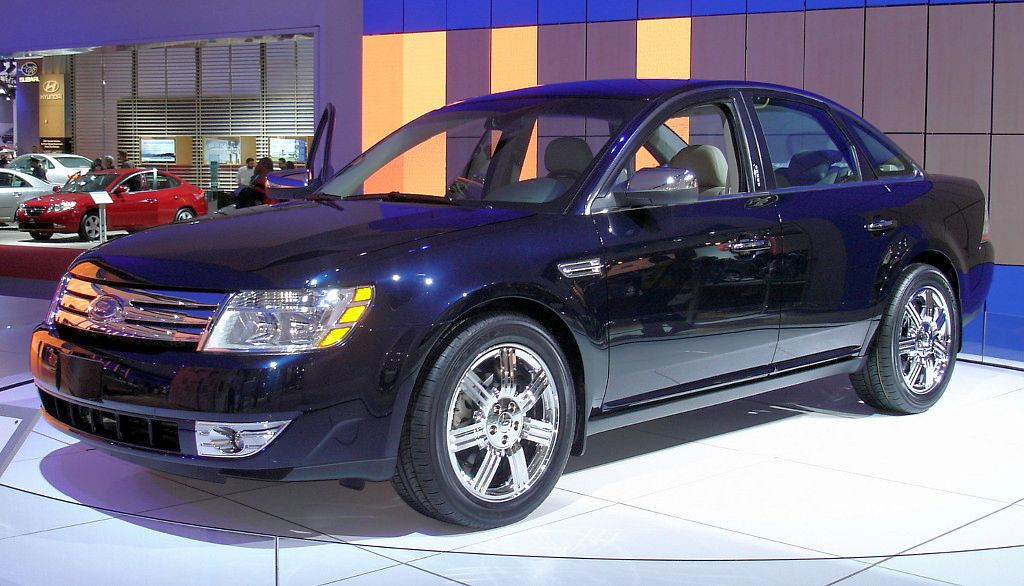
The 2008 Ford Five Hundred prototype, which was renamed "Taurus" upon Alan Mulally's request

The discontinuation of the Taurus sparked debate given its once-strong position in the market and Ford's well-publicized financial problems at the time. Analysts, customers and some interviewed Ford employees criticized the company for failing to invest in the car and keep it competitive, instead focusing all of its resources on developing and marketing trucks and SUVs. A USA Today editorial entitled "How Ford starved its Taurus" noted that the Taurus's death was part of a broader trend of the Detroit Big Three willingly abandoning once-successful nameplates and divisions in search of "the next big thing", while their foreign competitors have been gaining market share by continuously improving their veteran nameplates. This criticism was echoed by Autoblog, which held the Taurus up as an example of how Ford abandoned its successful products to chase emerging trends to varying degrees of success, a practice they blamed for Ford's struggles at the time. The Truth About Cars similarly lamented how Ford neglected the Taurus to the point where it became a "rental car".

Newly hired Ford CEO Alan Mulally expressed similar opinions, telling the Associated Press the decision "perplexed" him when he learned about it; he recalled asking subordinates, "How can it go away? It's the best selling car in America!" As the successor Five Hundred was struggling in the marketplace, Mulally viewed the decision to discontinue the Taurus as a "mistake that needed to be fixed", noting, "The customers want it back. They didn't want it to go away. They wanted us to keep improving it." At the time, Ford had already unveiled a face-lifted Five Hundred at the 2007 North American International Auto Show, which had revised styling and a more powerful engine. Partially blaming the Five Hundred's struggles on its name, Mulally decided that the revised vehicle should be marketed as the Taurus, the name he believed the Five Hundred sedan should have used from the beginning as he believed Ford was better off continuing to use its older nameplates that maintained decent brand equity rather than trying to build up new ones. The revised Five Hundred and Freestyle were showcased as the Taurus and Taurus X, respectively, at the 2007 Chicago Auto Show and went on sale that summer.

== Fifth generation (2008) ==
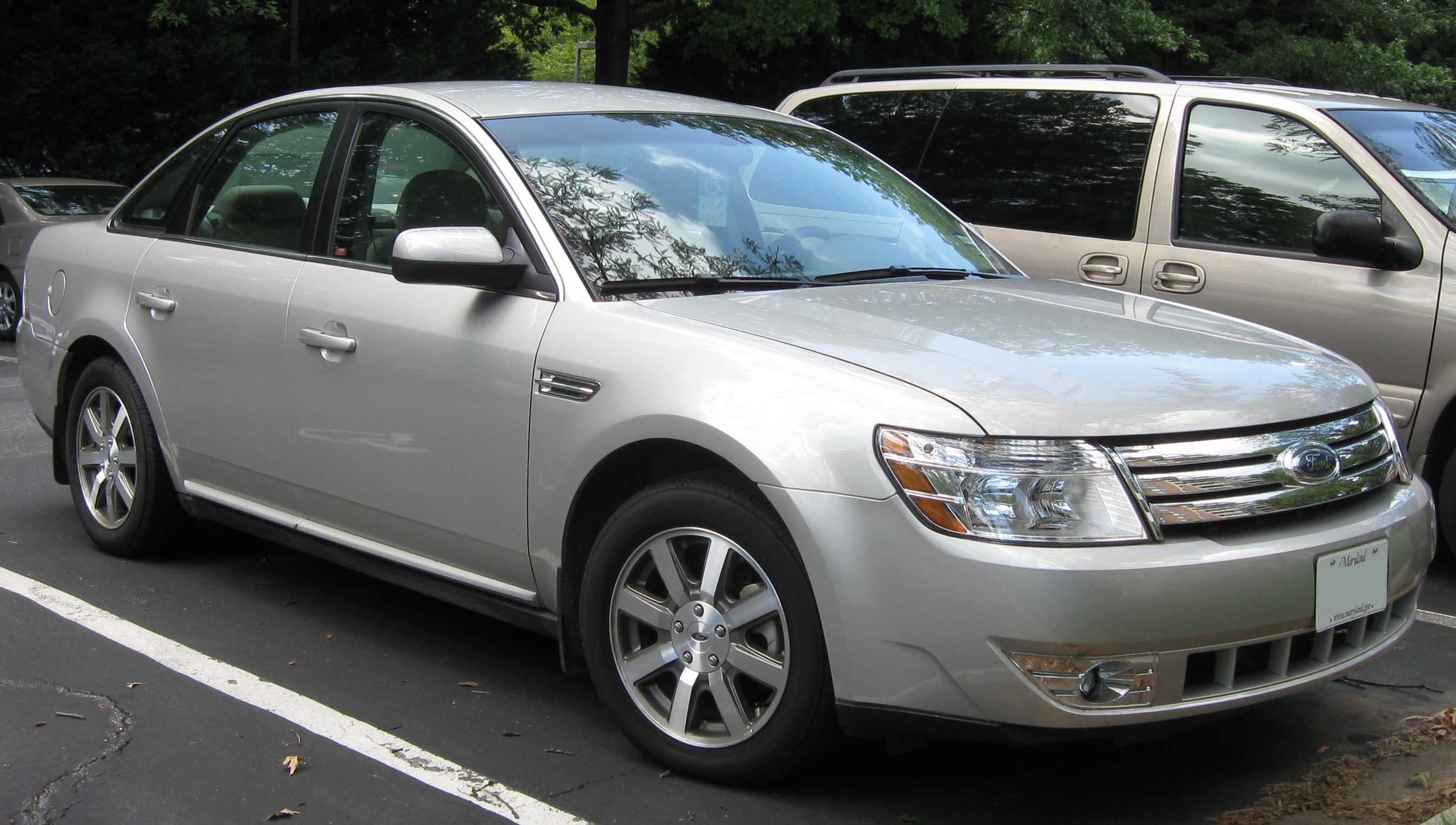
2008 Ford Taurus SEL

The fifth-generation Taurus entered production in 2007 as a 2008 model and was developed directly from the Ford Five Hundred, chiefly with a mild exterior facelift and revised engine and transmission. Ford designated the model as the Taurus, after the demise of the concurrently marketed fourth-generation Taurus and to take advantage of its customer recognition and dealer demand.

Changes to the fifth-generation Taurus from the Five Hundred included a new front end and the 263 hp 3.5 L Duratec 35 V6, replacing the 203 hp (151 kW) Duratec 30 3.0 L V6. The Five Hundred/Freestyle's ZF-Batavia CVT, which had a maximum torque rating of 221 lb⋅ft (300 N⋅m), was also replaced with a Ford–GM joint venture six-speed automatic with additional torque of the Duratec 35. The Aisin AW six-speed automatic which was used on FWD Five Hundred and Montegos was also replaced by the new Ford six-speed.

The Taurus sedan twin, the Mercury Sable nameplate, was revived and applied to the restyled Mercury Montego. For the 2009 model year, Ford revived the "SE" trimline for the Taurus. The SE sold for $24,125 according to Ford's website and served as the base model for the vehicle.

The fifth-generation Taurus was sold in the Middle East as the Ford Five Hundred from 2008.

It was determined that Ford's strategy to redesignate new cars in the lineup with new names beginning with the letter F, as in Ford Focus, Ford Fusion, and Ford Freestyle, was not a good marketing move, as some of the renamed cars had highly recognizable iconic names. Car buyers in the U.S. did not associate the new F names with Ford, and were confused by the name changes. Mulally believed that the Taurus had an immediately strong brand equity, and that it would take years for consumers to have a similar recognition of the Five Hundred.

The 2008 Ford Taurus and Mercury Sable were awarded the Top Safety Pick ratings by the Insurance Institute for Highway Safety (IIHS) and five-star ratings by the National Highway Traffic Safety Administration (NHTSA). The five-star rating given to the Taurus and the Sable is the highest safety rating being given by the government agency. It was also the first Ford of America model to come as standard with side airbags.

== Sixth generation (2010) ==
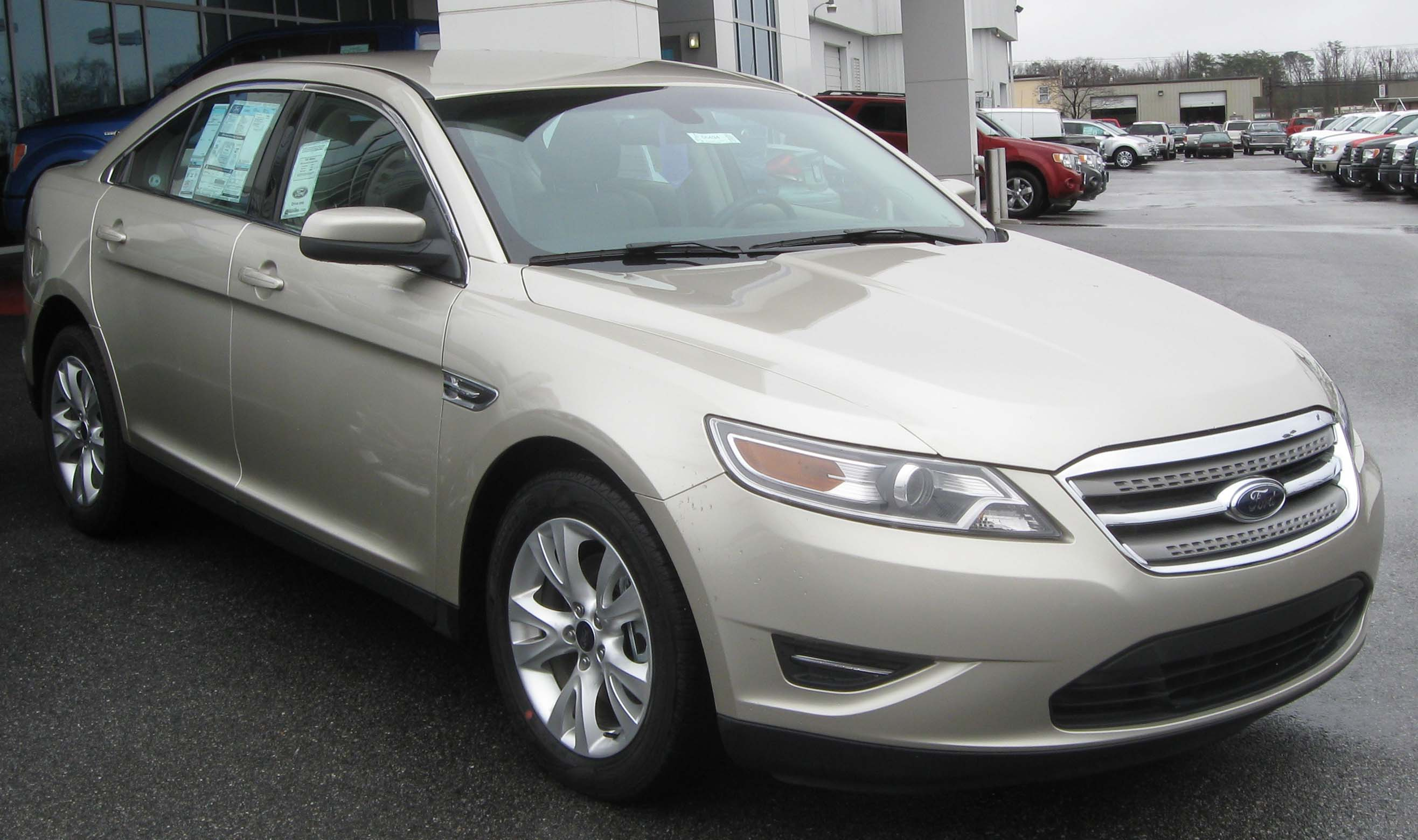
2010 Ford Taurus SEL

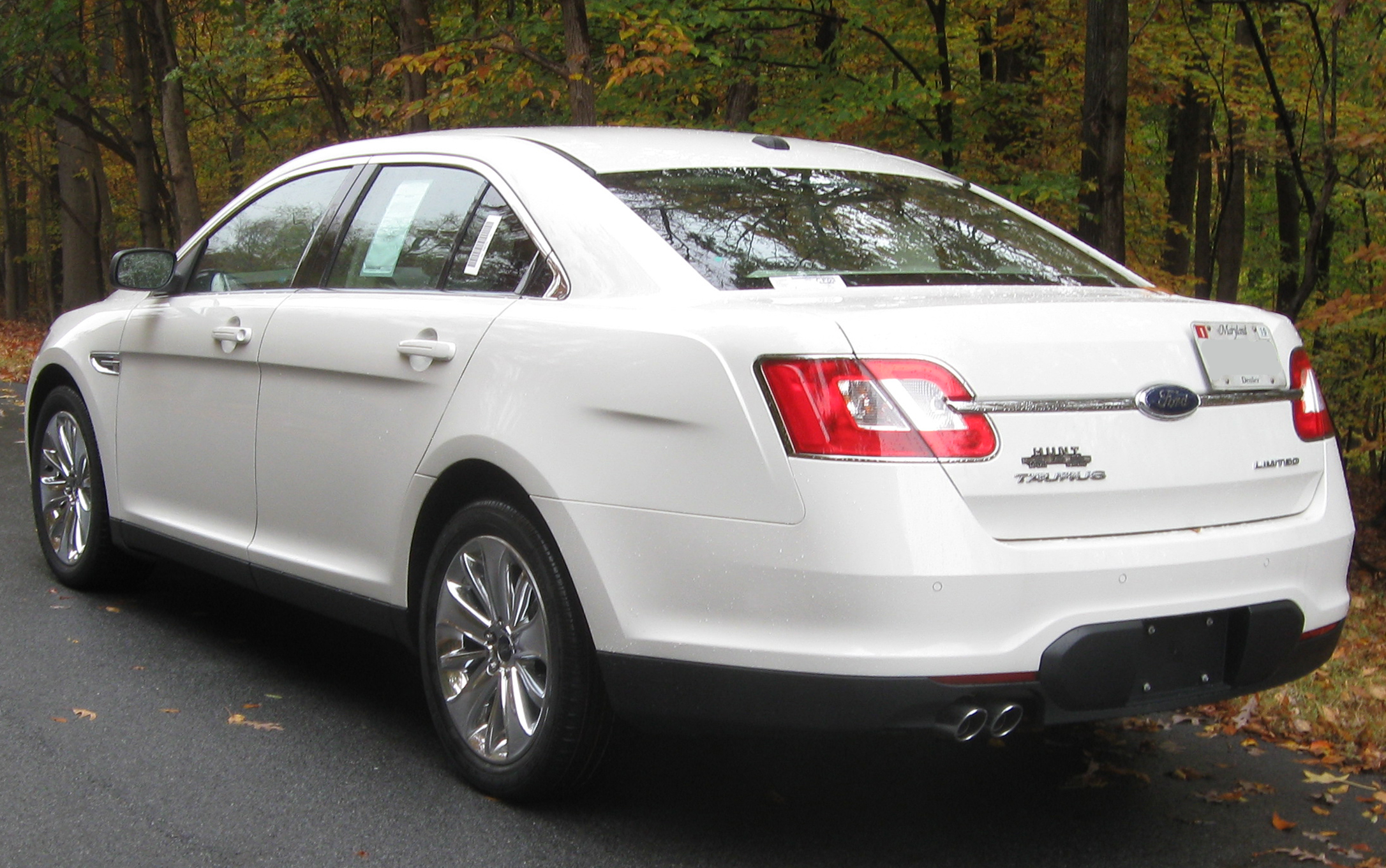
2010 Ford Taurus Limited

The 2010 Ford Taurus was presented at the Detroit International Auto Show in 2009 at Cobo Hall. The press preview of the Taurus and Taurus SHO was held in Asheville, North Carolina, from June 15 to 19, 2009.

The Taurus scored well in test drives and the media was pleased with some of its new optional features. Some of these features included all-wheel drive, cross traffic alert, collision warning, blind spot monitoring, and adaptive cruise control. However, others criticized the lack of interior room and reduced sight lines despite its full-sized exterior, and Edmunds noted that the eighth-generation Honda Accord (which competes in the mid-size category) had superior driving dynamics and a more efficient design, while offering almost as much interior space as the Taurus despite considerably smaller external dimensions.

The base price of the base SE model was $25,995, mid-level SEL $27,995, and top-level Limited $31,995. Ford had hoped to sell 10–15% of the sixth-generation Tauruses as high-performance SHO models.

The SHO (Super High Output), released in August 2009, was powered by a twin-turbocharged, gasoline direct-injection EcoBoost 3.5L V6 engine. It produced up to 365 horsepower (272 kW) and 350 lb⋅ft (470 N⋅m) of torque. EPA-estimated fuel economy ratings were 17 mpg city and 25 mpg highway AWD. The SHO base price was $37,995, which included the EcoBoost V6 mated to an upgraded 6-speed automatic transmission, all-wheel drive, and numerous exterior and interior trim upgrades. A fully loaded SHO could reach $45,395. There was also an available performance package which included upgraded brake pads, a 3.16:1 final drive ratio (compared to the standard 2.77:1), recalibrated electronic power steering, further suspension tuning, a re-calibrated AdvanceTrac system (Ford's combined traction control system and electronic stability control) with sport mode and "true off", summer-only tread-compound Goodyear Eagle F1 245/45ZR20 tires, and an electric air pump with a canned tire inflator in lieu of a spare tire. Most options for the SHO remained available, with the Performance Package including options such as power moonroof, heated/cooled seats, multi-contour seats, auto-sensing lights and wipers, automatic high-beams, adjustable pedals, Blind Spot Information System (BLIS), and satellite navigation. Options from the Driver Assist option group, however, were unavailable simultaneously with the Performance Package. Those options include adaptive cruise control, collision warning system, Lane Keep Assist, and Active Park Assist.

=== 2013 facelift ===
First revealed at the 2011 New York Auto Show, the Taurus received a mid-cycle refresh for the 2013 model year. The body featured a new front fascia and slightly updated rear fascia with LED taillamps, as well as all-new wheel options. The SHO model featured revised styling elements. Refinements were made to the 3.5 EcoBoost V6. Power in the 3.5L naturally aspirated V6, standard in non-SHO models, was up to 288 hp. With this engine, EPA-estimated fuel economy ratings were 19 mpg city and 29 mpg highway in FWD models, and 18 mpg city and 26 mpg highway in AWD models. There was a new engine option for non-SHO models, a 2.0L EcoBoost inline-4 developing up to 240 hp and 270 lb-ft of torque while delivering a best-in-class 22 mpg city and 32 mpg highway. All models received upgrades to the steering and braking systems to improve driveability, including standard torque vectoring and curve control, improving tracking at higher speeds. Updates to the instrument dials were added, which were fully digital, clearer, and more colorful. MyFord Touch was added as part of Taurus's Sync system.

=== Discontinuation (North America) ===
On April 25, 2018, Ford announced plans to discontinue the Taurus (along with the Fiesta, Focus, and Fusion), in order to focus more on its line of trucks and SUVs. The announcement was part of a plan by Ford Motor Company to cut costs and increase profits. This was in response to a shift in perceived consumer demand towards SUVs and pickup trucks, and away from sedans. On September 5, 2018, Ford ended all national and promotional advertising (including sales and special offers) for its entire sedan lineup, including the Taurus. On March 1, 2019, the last Ford Taurus built in the United States rolled off of the assembly line at the Ford Chicago plant. At its demise it cost $28,000.

== Seventh generation (2016) ==
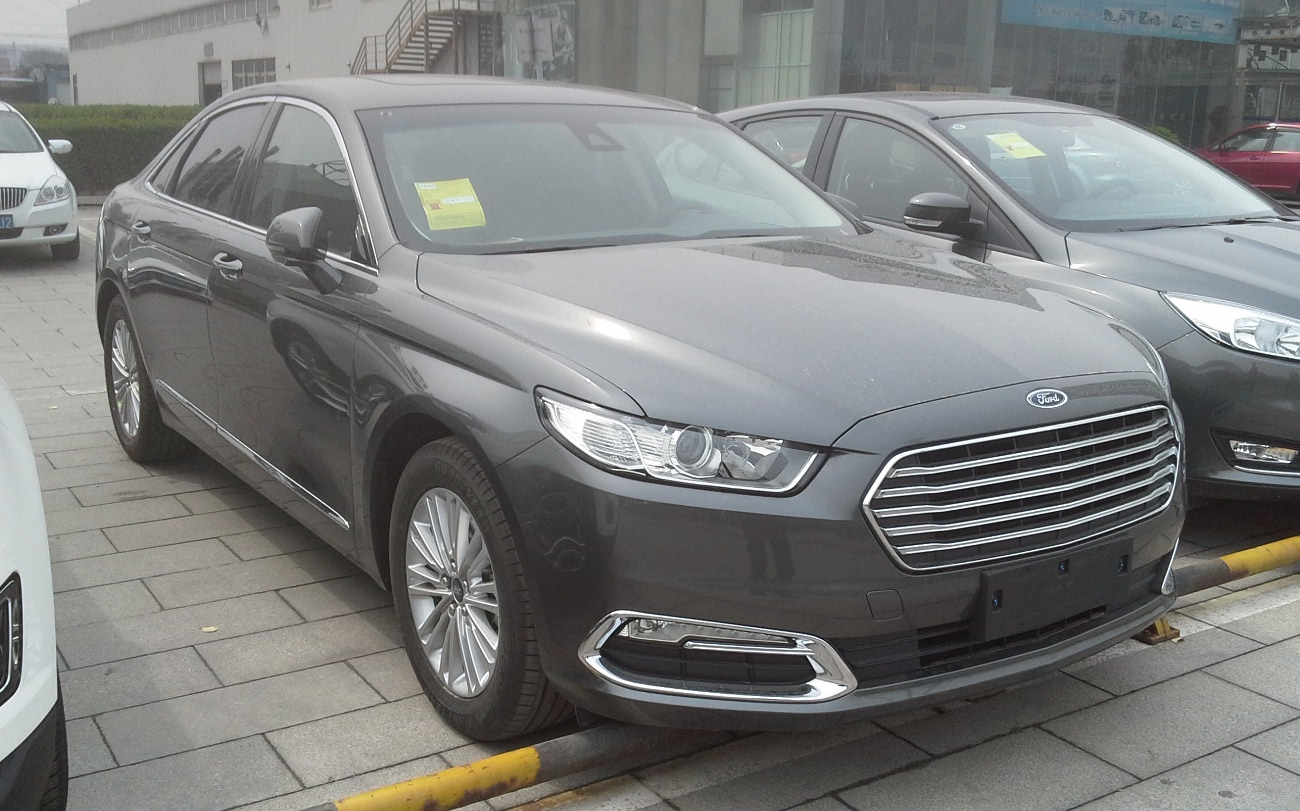
Ford Taurus

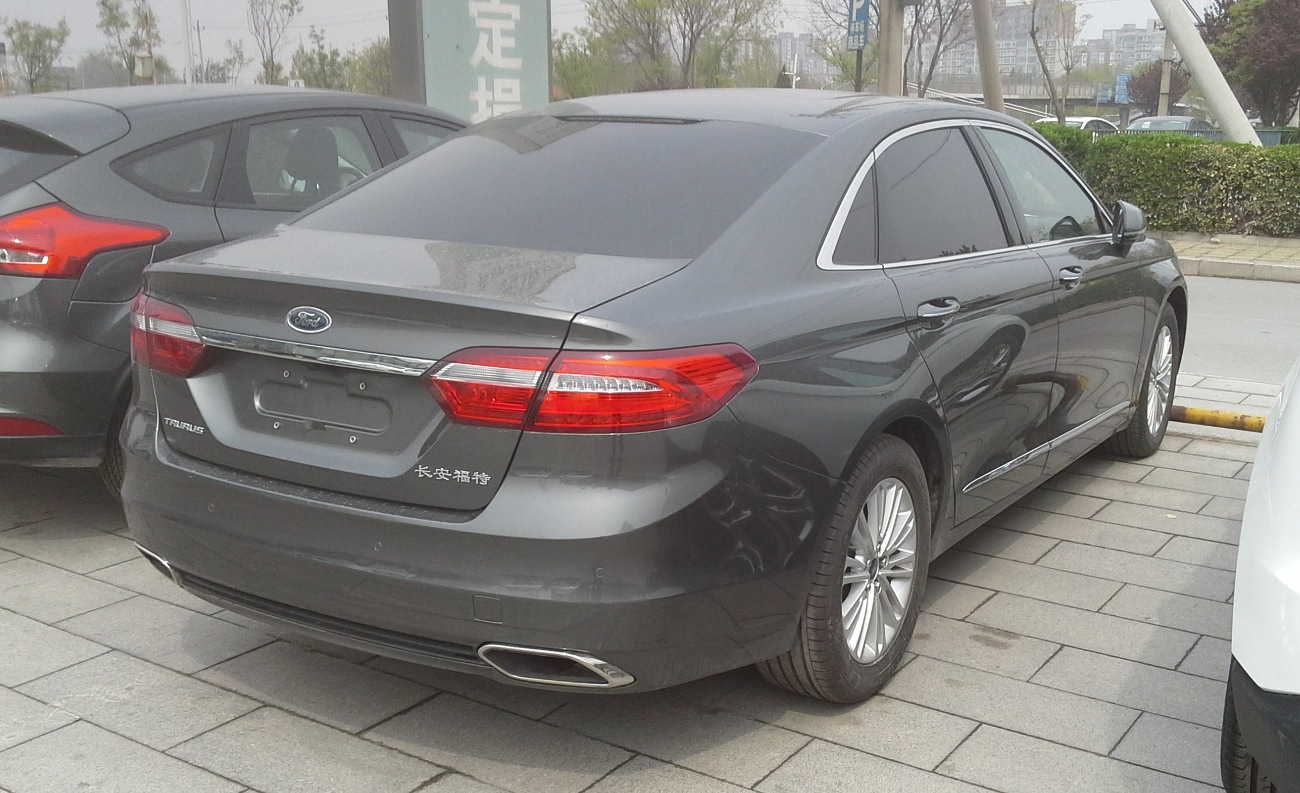
Ford Taurus

The seventh generation of the Ford Taurus was introduced at the 2015 Shanghai Auto Show. Unrelated to the previous six generations, the seventh generation was developed by Changan Ford in conjunction with Ford of Australia. Serving as the flagship of the Changan Ford joint venture, the Taurus is an extended-wheelbase variant of the Ford Fusion (Mondeo), differing primarily in its 3.9-inch longer wheelbase and formal rear roofline.

Manufactured since November 2015, Changan Ford produces its version of the Taurus in its Hangzhou facility. Produced solely for the Chinese market, there are currently no considerations towards export of the model line.

Derived from the Ford CD4 platform, the seventh-generation Taurus shares its platform architecture with the Ford Fusion and the Lincoln Continental. The standard engine is a 2.0L EcoBoost inline-4 (an option for the sixth-generation Taurus) and a 2.7L EcoBoost V6 (used in the Fusion and Lincoln Continental); a 6-speed automatic is paired to both engines.

== Eighth generation (2023) ==
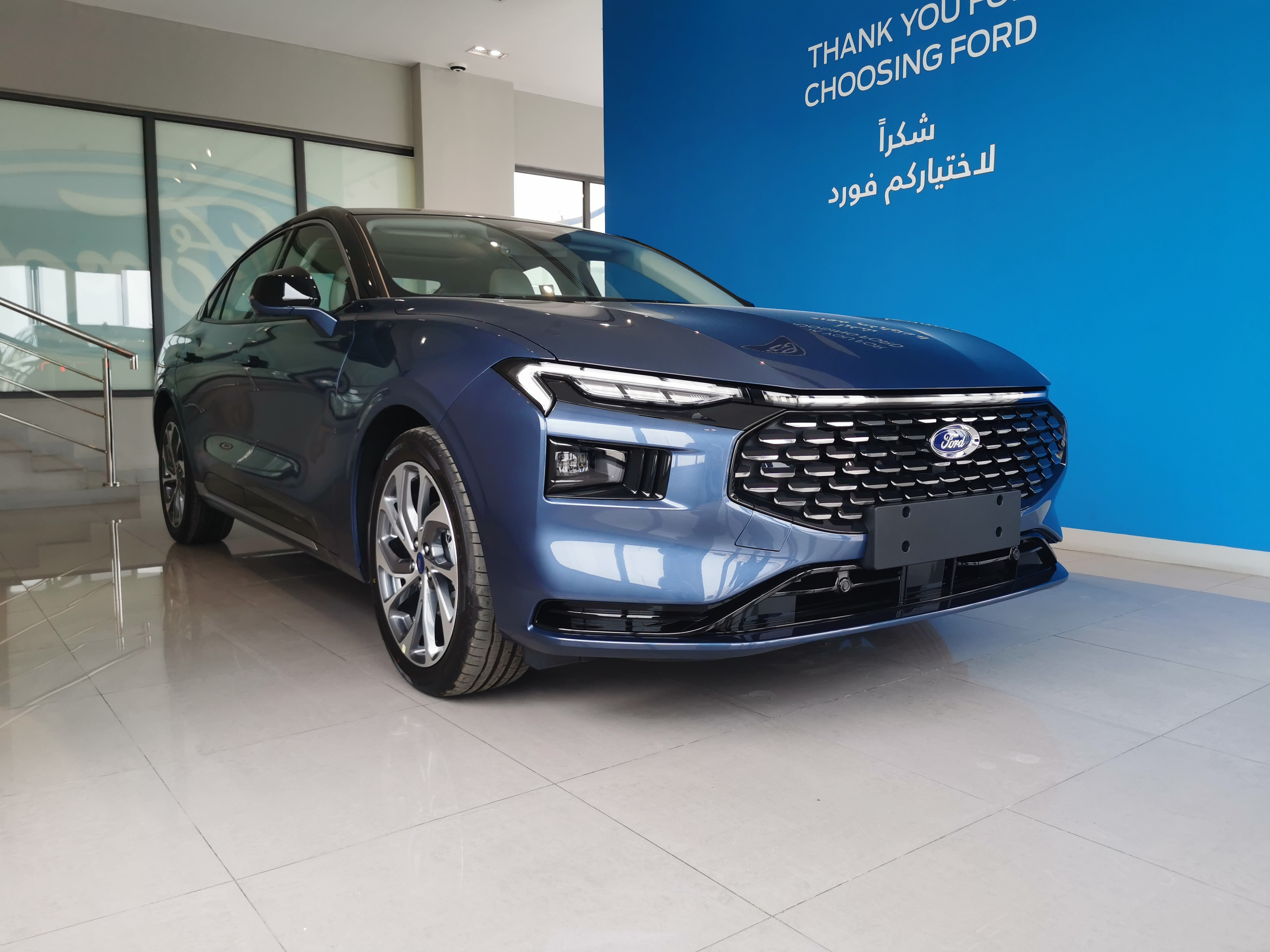
Ford Taurus Titanium

The fifth-generation Ford Mondeo is marketed in GCC countries as the Ford Taurus, replacing the Chinese-sourced Taurus.

== Sales ==
Calendar year	Taurus (US)	Police interceptor sedan (US)
1999	368,327	—N/a
2000	382,035	—N/a
2001	353,560	—N/a
2002	332,690	—N/a
2003	300,496	—N/a
2004	248,148	—N/a
2005	196,919	—N/a
2006	174,803	—N/a
2007	68,178	—N/a
2008	52,667	—N/a
2009	45,617	—N/a
2010	68,859	—N/a
2011	63,526	—N/a
2012	66,066	8,309
2013	69,063	10,897
2014	52,395	10,234
2015	39,051	9,765
2016	34,626	9,472
2017	33,242	7,994
2018	28,706	7,382
2019	9,924	3,427
Total	2,988,898	67,480

== See also ==
- List of Ford Taurus models
- Ford Taurus SHO
- Ford Police Interceptor
- Ford Taurus X
- Mercury Sable
- Ford Five Hundred
