= Flat tire =

Deflated pneumatic tire

Finding a leak with soapy water

A flat tire (British English: flat tyre) is a deflated pneumatic tire, which can cause the rim of the wheel to ride on the tire tread or the ground, potentially resulting in loss of control of the vehicle or irreparable damage to the tire. The most common cause of a flat tire is the puncturing of the tire by a sharp object, such as a nail or pin, which allows the air escape. Depending on the size of the blowout, the tire may deflate slowly or rapidly.

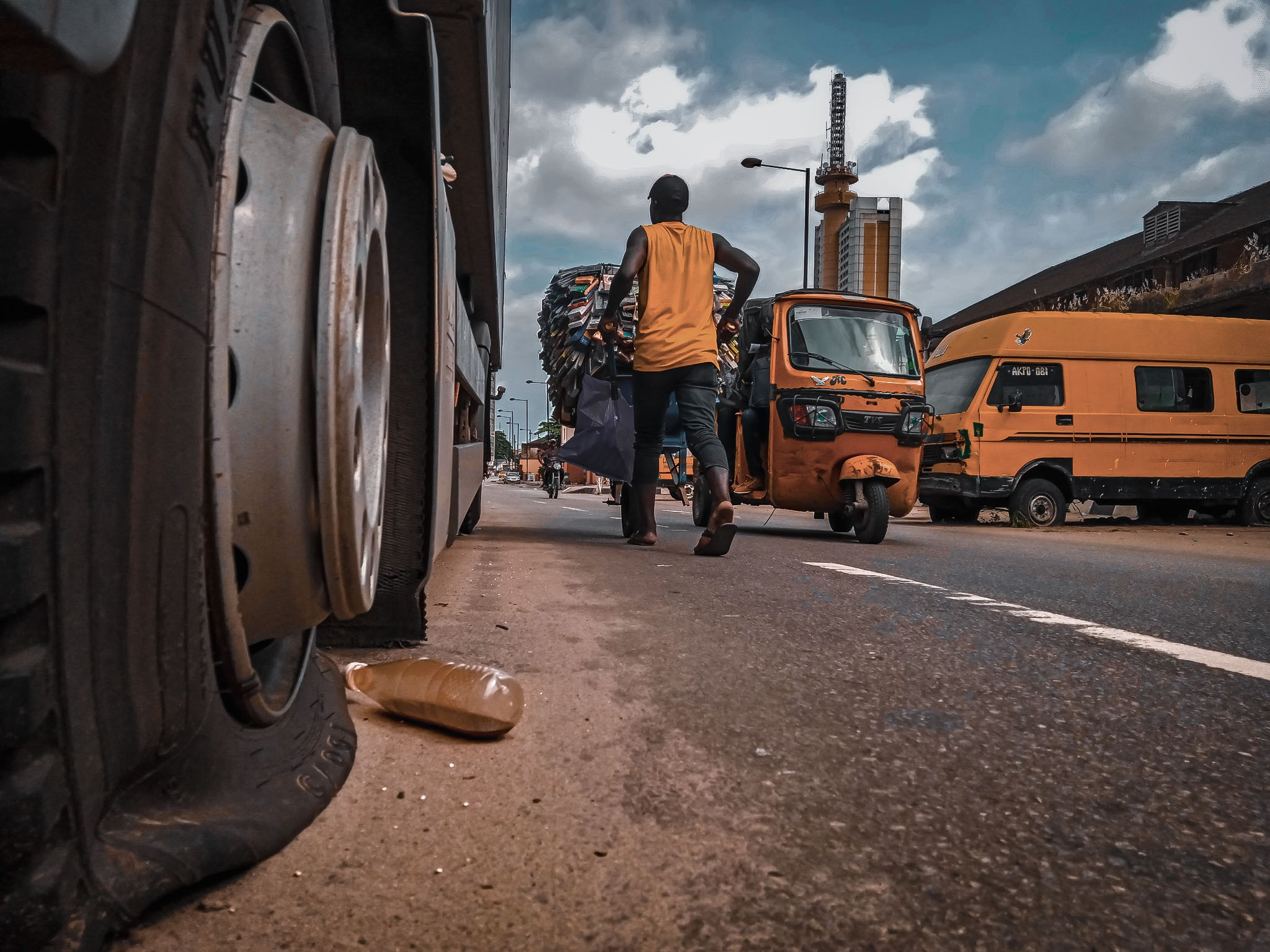
A flat tire in a busy district in Lagos, Nigeria. A vehicle with a flat tire can cause local delays in traffic.

Besides puncturing of the tire a flat can be caused by: failure of or damage to the valve stem; a nail in the tire; rubbing of the tire against the road; ripping of the tire; separation of tire and rim by collision with another object; excessive wear of the tire tread allowing explosive tire failure or road debris tearing through the tire. Some tires, particularly those with a slow leak, can be repaired and re-inflated; others, especially those with worn tread, must be replaced.

== Driving or riding with a flat tire ==
Where a flat tire occurs, drivers are advised to slow gradually and pull off the road. Continuing to drive may damage the wheel, the hub or other parts of the vehicle. Driving with a flat tire, especially at high speeds, may result in a loss of control and possibly result in a car accident.

On a bicycle, a flat tire will compromise handling, as well as increasing rolling resistance.

== Flat tire repair ==
=== Motor vehicles ===
A UK source reports that flat tires account for about 10% of motor vehicle breakdowns.

Motor vehicles are normally equipped for changing a tire. These tools include a jack, a tire iron or lug wrench, and a spare tire. Air pumps run by hand-lever, pressure cans, or electricity can be used to re-inflate slow-leaking tires.

One common way to temporarily repair and re-inflate a punctured tire at the roadside is to use a canned tire sealant. The motorist attaches this to the valve, and the compressed propellant inside forces the can's contents through the valve into the tire, a liquid sealant is forced towards the puncture and will seal the puncture. The compressed propellant also inflates the tire. Tire sealant is typically useful on punctures of 3/16in. (5mm) diameter or less. According to research carried out by Continental Tires, 95% of punctures are caused by objects of 5mm or less. Typically, the sealant is a water-based latex solution that can easily be removed by a tire repair professional before a permanent repair is made. Canned tire sealants are quick and simple to use and have the added benefit of working when the vehicle is in a dangerous location such as at the side of a busy highway, or on uneven ground.

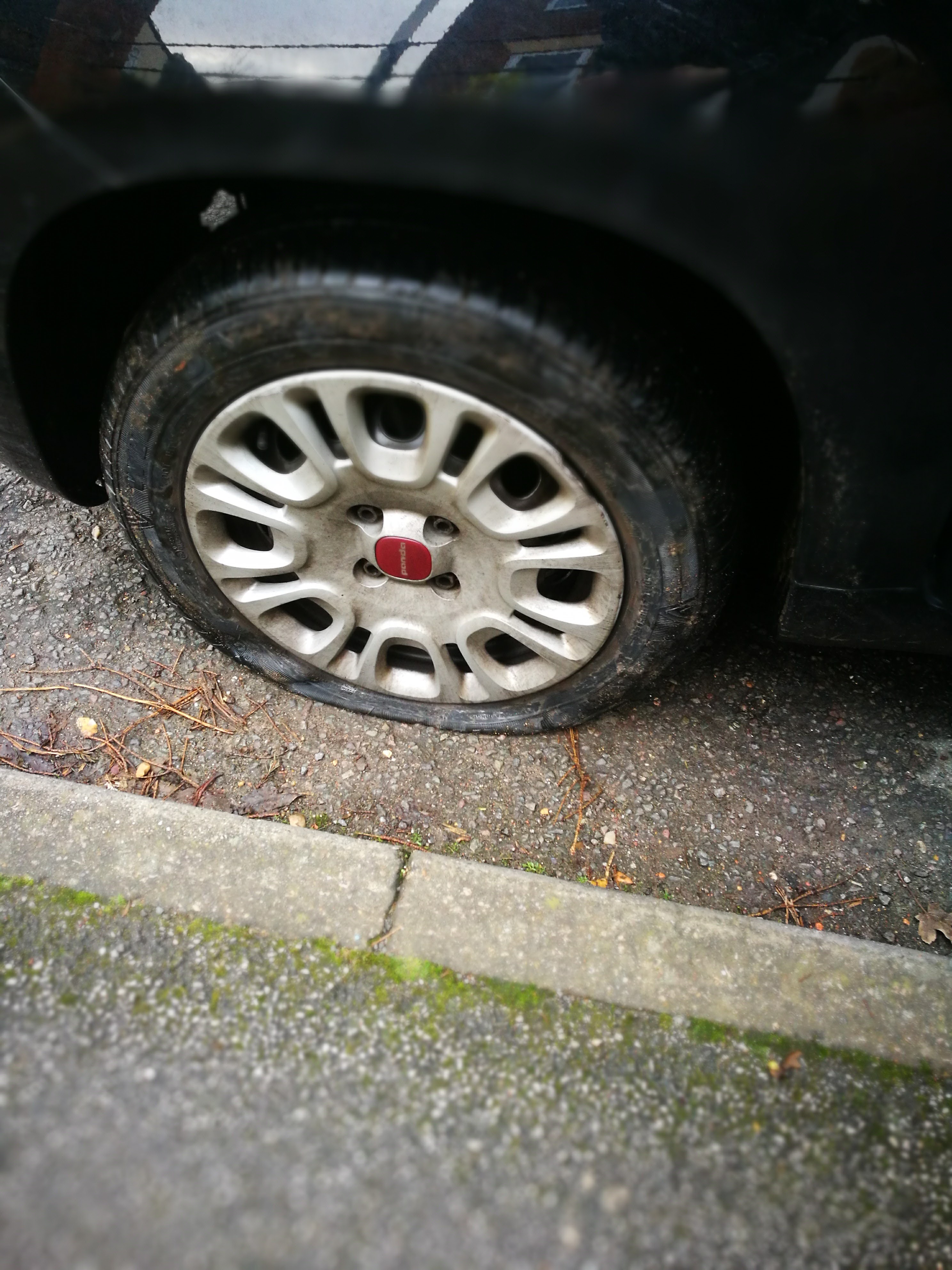
A flat tire on a Fiat Panda automobile

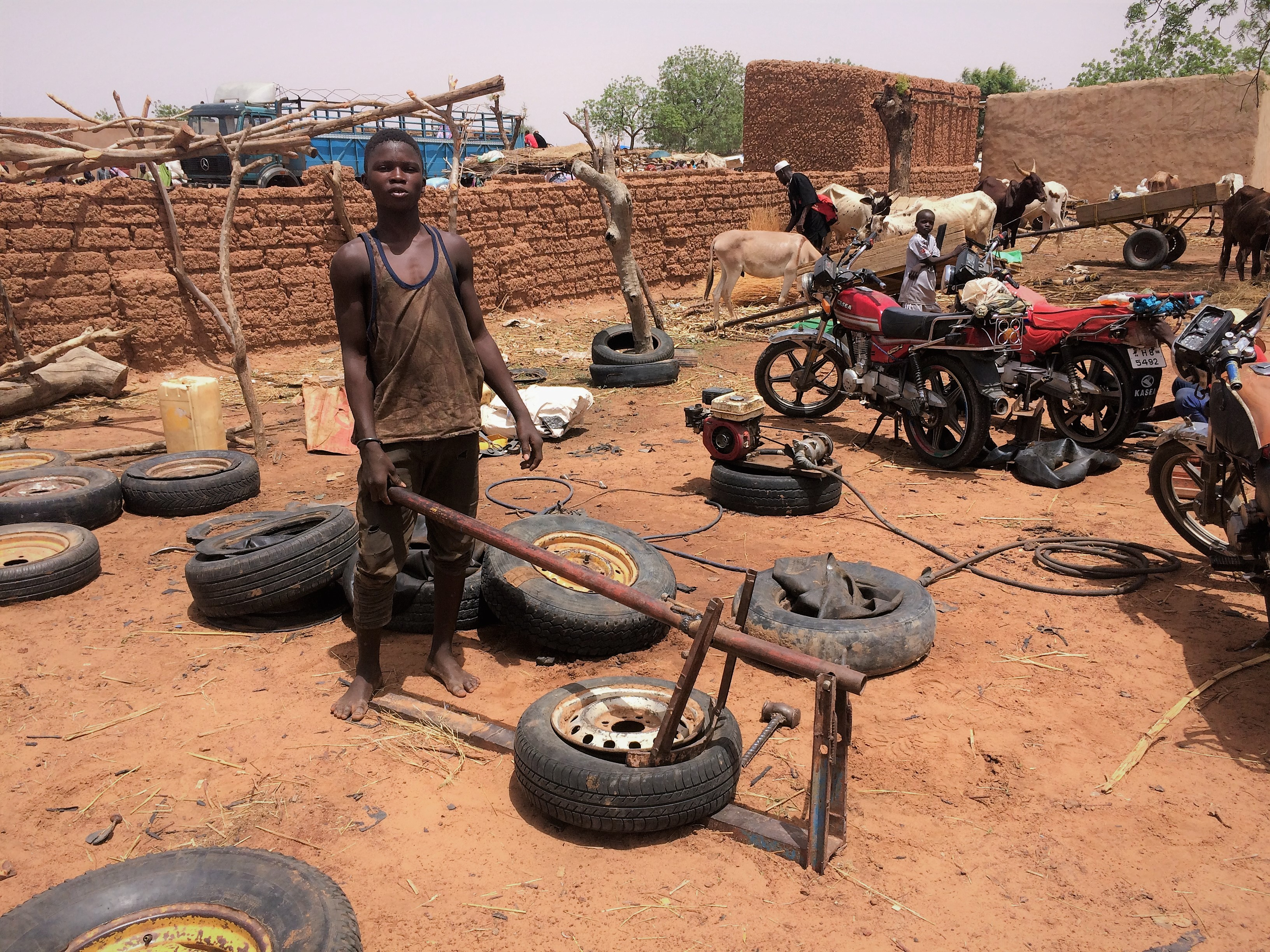
A roadside tire repair shop in Niger, West-Africa

A water-based sealant can be injected into the tire also through the valve stem. This contains less harmful chemicals and no aerosol gas. The sealant can then be driven into the tire using an air compressor.

A flat tire can be repaired by a patch or plug; or the tire may repair itself. Self-sealing tires work on punctures up to a certain size.

Patch repair is commonly used in a repair shop. Some may not patch a worn tire if: the hole is close to a previous patch; there are already more than two patches; the puncture requires more than two patches; the punctures are too close, and/or the puncture is close to the sidewall. A patch is performed by removing the tire, marking the puncture, scouring the surface to create a smooth surface (inside of the tire), applying rubber cement, applying the patch, then pressing it into the surface with a small metal wheel attached to a handle. An alternative is a combination patch and plug. This is manufactured with a plug built into it; applying this patch is done similarly except with more steps, including drilling a hole at the puncture so the plug can be pulled through it, as well as cutting off the excess plug from the outside the tire.

The final method, the tire plug, can be performed without removing the tire. The penetrating object is removed from the tire, and a plug coated in rubber cement then inserted with a handle, typically supplied with the kit. Many technicians consider plugs less reliable than patching though more reliable than sealant.

One disadvantage of patching a tire is that due to the process requiring one to remove the tire from the wheel, the tire must be balanced again when it is put back on the wheel. Tire sealant also creates an imbalance in the tire, but since it is a temporary repair, it is considered less of an issue. However, the issue of disposal of the tire sealant, the hazards to the technician, as well as the required cleaning of both the inside of the tire as well as the wheel could all be considered disadvantages of tire sealant.

Tires can leak air for a variety of reasons. These include, but are not limited to: damage to the wheel itself, a damaged valve stem, a puncture in the tire (which can be hard to find if the puncturing object didn't embed itself in the tire) and improper installation of the tire, which could involve the bead of the tire being cut when installed with excessive force.

Occasionally, a puncture may not "go all the way through" to the inside of the tire. Thus, before coming to the conclusion that a puncture is causing air to leak from the tire, attempt to remove the puncture lightly by hand. It's very possible that the head of a nail or a very short nail created the appearance of a puncture, while not actually being one.

Apart from deflation caused by punctures or tire stem damage, tires simply lose air over time even with no holes or damage. A brand new tire, properly inflated, will lose air even with no punctures present. This is mainly due to the design of the valve stem, among other reasons. Given enough time, a tire can fully deflate with no outside causes.

=== Bicycles ===
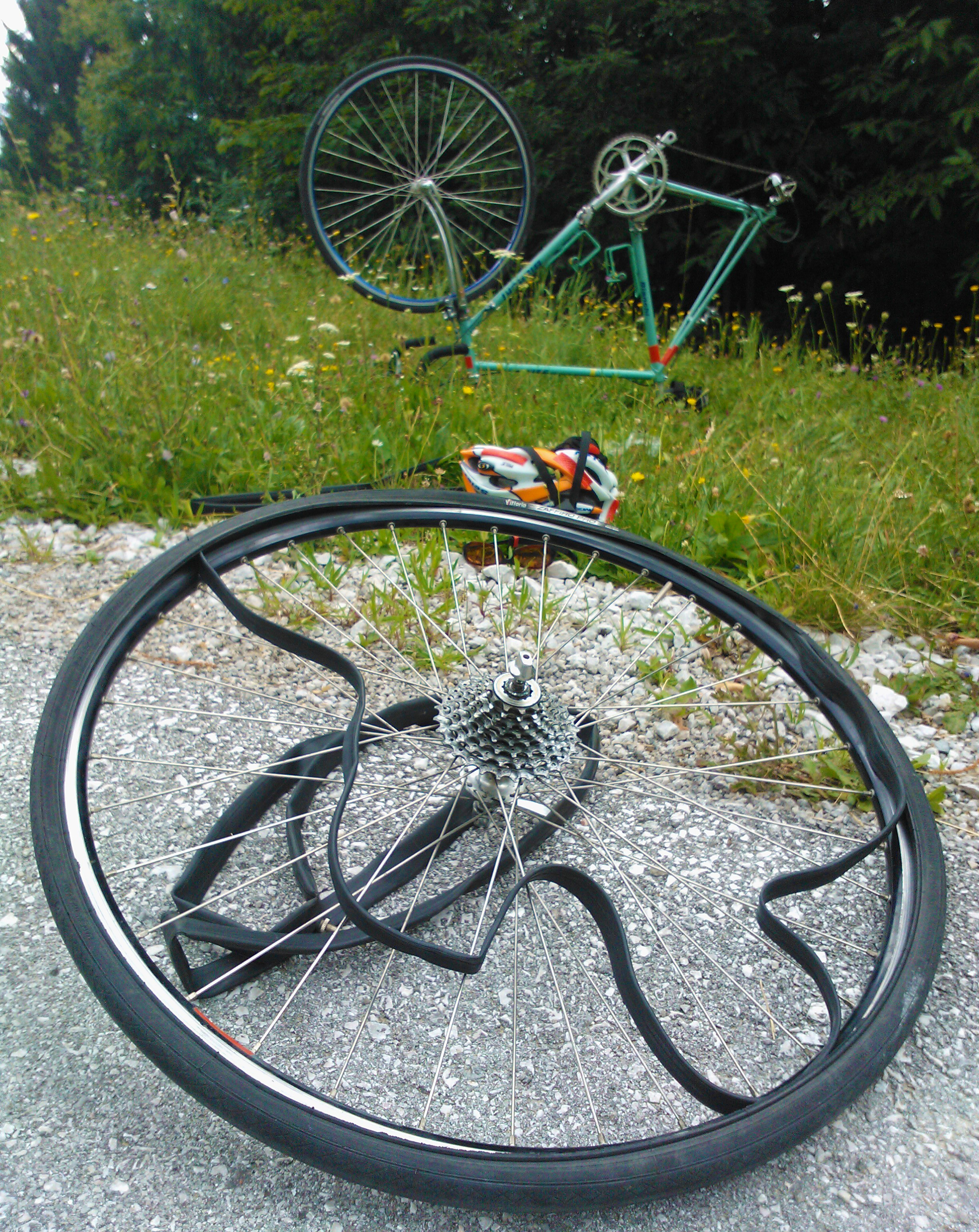
Replacing a punctured inner tube on a road bicycle

Thin-walled tires, especially those used in road racing bicycles, are particularly susceptible to puncture by road debris, such as thorns, and small pieces of glass that would not affect tires with more substantial tread. The equipment needed to repair or replace a bicycle inner tube is comparatively minimal, and frequently carried by cyclists.

On the road, the easiest approach to dealing with a flat tire, should a spare inner tube be available, is to replace the tube. The wheel is removed, the tire levered from the rim and inspected for causes of damage. If a nail or thorn is found, it must be removed. Then the inner tube is replaced and the wheel inflated. Re-inflation can be carried out by the use of a frame mounted pump, mini pump or a CO_{2} cartridge inflator. The CO_{2} cartridge is generally a single use item only while the pump can be used to inflate many flat tires. The inner tube may then be repaired at a later date.

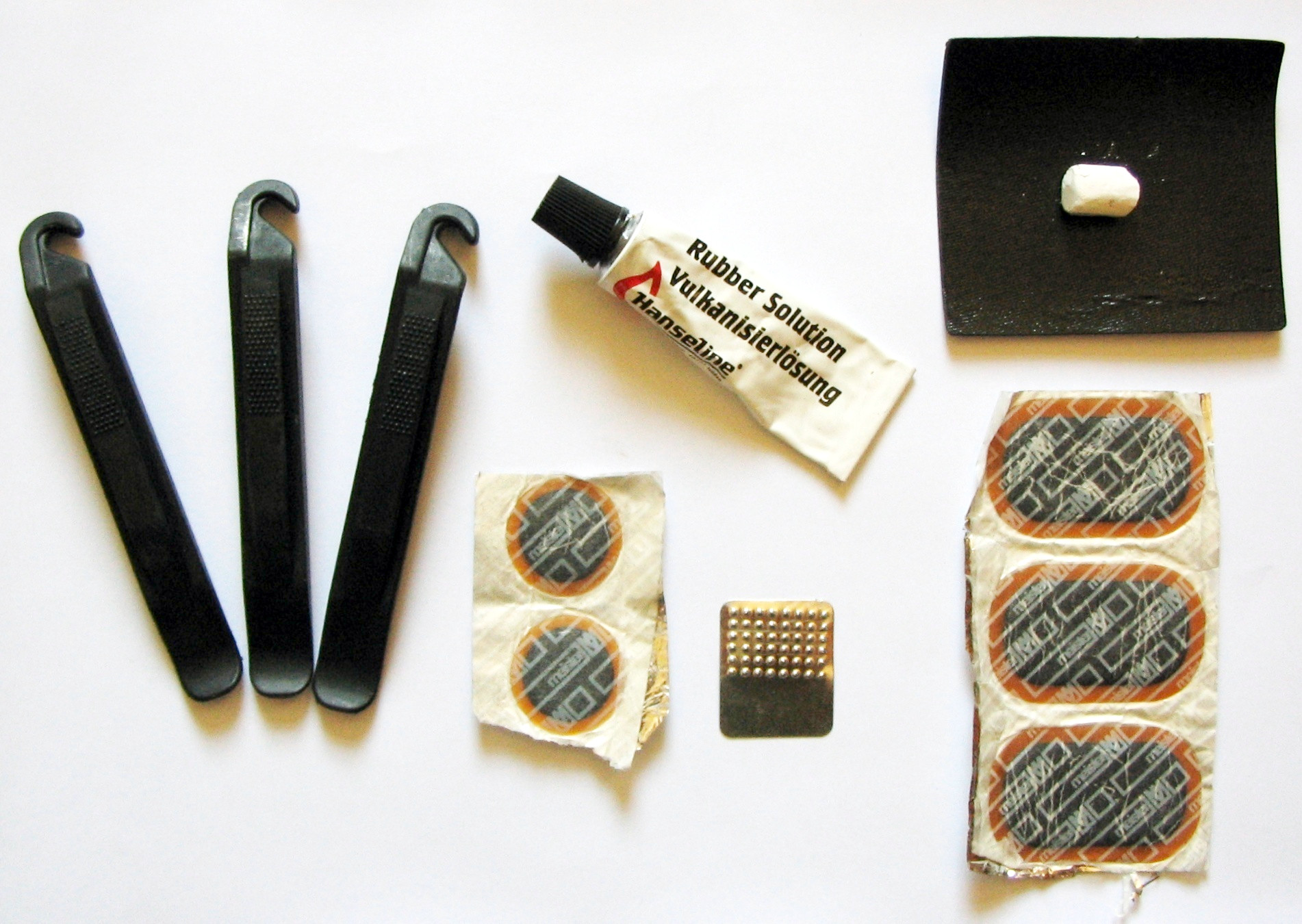
Puncture repair kit, complete with tire levers, vulcanizing fluid, abrasive grater and fabric, puncture patches, and a bit of chalk to mark the puncture

The repair of inner tubes may be necessary on the road. Several methods exist to locate a small puncture, including submersion in water with dish soap, but without a bowl of water available, the simplest method may be to inflate the tube until air can be felt escaping from the puncture. Once located, the puncture is cleaned, and a patch applied (see Louis Rustin for the invention of the puncture patch). Once the glue on the patch is dry, the tire is test-inflated off the wheel to ensure that the patch was successful. If the patch holds, the tube is delated, then re-mounted on the wheel and inflated. Note that tire valves may also become damaged. In this case, repair of the inner tube will not be possible, and the tube should be replaced.

Should damage to the tread of the outer tire be substantial, a tough, self-adhesive patch, known as a boot may additionally be placed inside the tire. Some cyclists carry self-adhesive patches for quick repair. While self-adhesive patches enable quicker repairs, they are only intended for temporary repair, until the cyclist can get a glue-on patch. Folded paper currency is used as a makeshift boot by cyclists in need of an emergency repair to enable them to return to their destination.

Racing bicycles frequently use tubular tires, which are glued to a special, flat wheel rim. The use of these is often restricted to circumstances where a full spare wheel is available. Another approach to preventing punctures of lightweight tires is to use kevlar belts in the tire tread construction.

Another approach to preventing punctures in bicycle and other tires in general is the use of Slime, a proprietary brand of injectable liquid thick chemical goo. This chemical "goo" has a tendency to stick to, and coat the outer wall of the inner tube or tire, thus adding another layer of flexible rubber-type protection on the inside of the inner tube or tire. MTB riders, or "Mountain Bike Riders", may further pre-treat their tires to prevent serious punctures or to prevent punctures in the first place. There are other brands of this same type of liquid, either in an unpressurized container or pressurized container with inflatable gas which is sold in many auto and bicycle stores. The auto sales version of this Fix-A-Flat type of chemical is sold in America.

== Dangers of changing a flat tire ==
Motorists stranded by a flat tire face a number of hazards. The most common hazard is from the passing traffic. Especially if the tire is on the side closer to the road, the motorist is at risk of getting hit by a passing car. If the motorist is unable to pull over to a place where the tire being changed is on the opposite side from the moving traffic, he may be directly in the path of or just inches away from passing cars. Even if some type of warning is placed on the road, a motorist not fully attentive may not be able to avoid the situation. Some motorists, especially those with less physical strength, may risk injury while attempting to change a tire. Often, lug nuts are bolted very tightly to the wheel, and tires themselves are quite heavy. While the use of a run-flat tire can prevent these problems, some run-flat tires have other inherent flaws that make them less appealing.

== Run-flat tire ==
A run-flat tire is a pneumatic vehicle tire designed to resist the effects of deflation when punctured, allowing the vehicle to continue to be driven at reduced speeds for limited distances. First developed by tire manufacturer Michelin in the 1930s, run-flat tires were introduced to the public market in the 1980s. They have increased in popularity over time. One type of run-flat tires uses a substance called tire mousse.

== See also ==
- Tire manufacturing
- Tire Pressure Monitoring System
