= Chrome Peel =

Condition in automotive accessories

Chrome peel is a condition in which the chrome coating of a wheel, usually that of a car, disintegrates in the area where the tire is bound to the wheel. Gradually the air escapes and a slow leak of pressure from the tire occurs. A common cause is failure to thoroughly clean the inside of the wheel and tire after the usage of emergency tire inflation applications such as "Fix-A-Flat."

Under certain conditions, technicians may be able to slow down the process by sanding down or smoothing out the target area of the wheel, but eventually the chrome peels even more and the tire loses pressure again. Re-chroming the wheel, or replacing it altogether is more often advised.
