= Louis Rustin =

Louis Désiré Auguste Rustin (1880-1954) was a French cyclist and repairer of tyres in Paris who invented the puncture patch. Car and bicycle tyres had until then been complicated to mend after the inner tube, which held the air, had been penetrated through the outer tyre by a flint or other sharp object. Rustine's solution was a small disc of thin rubber to stick to the inner tube over the hole. He patented his invention in 1921 and presented it at a meeting of the Touring Club de France in 1922. Puncture patches are still commonly known in France as rustines.

== History ==
Louis Rustin was born in Paris, France, on 29 February 1880, the son of a hotel manager and, his mother, a cook. His birth came after the growth of the bicycle industry and the first flourishing of the automobile industry. Cars and bicycles used pneumatic tires and could be brought to a halt when a sharp object, common on roads of the period, penetrated the outer tyre and deflated the rubber chamber within it that held the air.

Rustin went into business in the rue Truffaut in the 17th arrondissement of Paris in 1903 to repair and replace the tread of tyres. He also competed in cycling races. Bicycle tyres, and in particular those used in competitions, were fragile and vulnerable to punctures. Rustin and other racers were occasionally brought to a halt, forced to repair their machines by the roadside.

The cycling historian Raymond Henry says repairs before Rustin's invention were made by cutting a patch from a discarded air tube, scraping it with a file, then cleaning it with petrol. The repair patch and punctured tube were then coated with rubber solution and each heated above a flame until the rubber had reached the correct temperature and softness. The patch was then pressed on to the air tube and held until the rubber had cooled enough to make the attachment permanent.

Rustin developed his ideas from 1908 with his colleague, Jean Larroque, registering a first patent, number 397 424, on 15 December 1908. Research ended with the start of World War I in 1914. Rustin fought in the army, then returned to the tyre industry after demobilisation, opening a workshop at 16 rue du Bois in Clichy (now the rue Henri Barbusse). It was there that he made the first modern puncture patch, a thin circular patch of flexible rubber that was already coated with a gum that did not need to be heated. He patented his invention, offering “ instant repair of inner tubes without solutions, without petrol, without anything ” The patent covered the patch, the dry fixative attached to it, and the protective bands which kept the patch clean until they were removed just before the repair.

The formula for the fixing coat was devised by a chemist, Paul Doumenjou, who also helped create early non-inflammable film for the cinema industry.

=== Marketing ===
Rustin bought tickets for the six-day race at the Vélodrome d'Hiver in Paris and gave them to young cyclists in the city. They sat on opposite sides of the track. One side shouted "Hisssssss...!" when a rider punctured, those on the other responded with "Rustine, Rustine, Rustine..." Rustine later sponsored competitions during the Tour de France and in other races such as Bordeaux-Paris introduced a Kilomètre Rustine challenge on the track, and sponsored riders such as André Leducq.

Rustin presented his invention to a rally of the Touring Club de France at Fontainebleau in June 1922. A jury including Gaston Clément, who the following year established the Fédération Française des Sociétés de Cyclotourisme, awarded him its grande médaille.

== Expansion ==
Rustin's business employed 90 people at Clichy, where he had three workshops. It was making 28 million puncture patches a month by 1933. It moved to a larger factory in the Loir valley between Tours and Le Mans. Work stopped during the German occupation of France between 1940 and 1944. Work restarted and production increased rapidly from 1947, the company employing up to 250 people.

Rustin expanded into other areas of the rubber industry in the 1950s and still makes puncture patches today. It is run by Rustin's descendants and it has kept the original marketing slogan: “ Joined for life ”

Rustin died in 1954. He is buried in the Cimetière Sud at Clichy.
