= Canned tire inflator =

Single-use fixes for flat tires

Canned tire inflators are single-use devices intended to provide a quick, temporary solution to drivers who experience flat tires. These devices seal the punctured tire and then reinflate it with pressurized gas, providing enough pressure to allow the auto to be driven for a short period at low speed. This allows the motorist to have the damaged tire professionally repaired or replaced, avoiding the need to replace the wheel at the roadside.

Canned tire inflators contain a pressurised fluid mixture of three components:

- solvents, which make the sealants adhere to the rubber tire
- sealants, which temporarily seal the puncture
- propellants, which push the sealant from the can and into the tire and which inflate the tire.

The sealants used in some systems can be removed with soap and water while wet, but require mineral spirits to dissolve them once they have solidified.

== Current issues ==
- The biggest complaint by tire professionals regarding tire inflators is around removing the sealant from inside the tire. They believe that it is a difficult, time-involved process that may damage the tire. Some brands like Fix-A-Flat offer a water-soluble formulation that allows the product to be removed quickly and easily with a towel and water.
- The gas used in some inflators contains butane which is flammable and which may explode if exposed to high temperatures (either when in the can or in a re-inflated tire). Other inflators use a non-flammable formulation instead.
- Also for safety reasons, the US National Highway Traffic and Safety Administration has mandated that all 2008 vehicles sold in the US and manufactured on or after September 1, 2007 must be equipped with tire pressure monitoring systems. Because many of these sensors are inside the tire, there was a concern about whether or not canned tire inflators and sealants would affect the sensors’ ability to correctly operate. Manufacturers have been working on finding solutions to this new legislation.
- If a canned tire inflator is used on a tire mounted on a wheel with chrome plating, then it is very important to thoroughly clean the entire wheel and the inside of the tire in order to prevent chrome peel.
