= Peter Brock Medal =

Award by Motorsport Australia

The Peter Brock Medal was created by Motorsport Australia to help promote the passion and ideals of the late race driver Peter Brock. The core values are passion for motorsport, the fans and comradery for fellow competitors.

== Overview ==
The first recipient of the medal in 2011 was New Zealander Jason Richards who won the medal posthumously. The next winner was multiple Supercars Champion and former Formula 3000 driver Craig Lowndes. The next recipient in 2014 was multiple Australian Rally Championship winner and former World Rally Championship driver Neal Bates. 2014 saw another New Zealander 'Gentleman' Jim Richards win.

2015 saw the first female winner with Molly Taylor after finishing runner-up in the Australian Rally Championship and competing in the World Rally Championship. In 2016, former Formula 1 driver and WEC Champion Mark Webber won. Next up in 2017 was Will Brown who won the 2016 Australian Formula 4 Championship, 2016 Australian Toyota 86 Racing Series and runner-up in the 2016 Australian Formula Ford Series. In 2018, former Australian Formula Ford Champion and Formula Renault 1.6 NEC Champion Anton de Pasquale won after a stella rookie season in Supercars. Rounding out the 20 teens was new rally sensation Harry Bates joining father Neal Bates as a winner after winning the 2019 Australian Rally Championship and runner-up in the 2019 Asia-Pacific Rally Championship.

2020 winner was Alex Peroni with three podiums in the FIA Formula 3 Championship. 2021 winner was Toby Price OAM winner of the Dakar Rally twice. In 2022, Supercars driver Thomas Randle and former 2014 Australian Formula Ford Champion and 2017 Toyota Racing Series Champion scooped the award after winning the 2020 Super2 Series. 2023 Supercars Champion and NASCAR driver Brodie Kostecki won the 2023 medal. 2024 saw multi-time Australian Rally Championship Champion Navigator Coral Taylor join her daughter Molly Taylor as a winner.

== Winners ==
Year	Driver	Series	Source
2011	Jason Richards	Supercars	Source 1 2
2012	Craig Lowndes OAM	Supercars	Source 1 2
2013	Neal Bates	Australian Rally Championship	Source 2
2014	Jim Richards	Touring Car Masters	Source 2
2015	Molly Taylor	Australian Rally Championship	Source 2
2016	Mark Webber AM	FIA World Endurance Championship	Source 1 2
2017	Will Brown	Super2 Series	Source 2
2018	Anton De Pasquale	Supercars	Source 1 2
2019	Harry Bates	Australian Rally Championship	Source 2
2020	Alex Peroni	FIA Formula 3 Championship	Source 1 2 3 4 5 6
2021	Toby Price OAM	Dakar Rally	Source 2
2022	Thomas Randle	Supercars	Source 2 3
2023	Brodie Kostecki	Supercars	Source 1 2
2024	Coral Taylor	Australian Rally Championship	Source 2
