= 2018 Rally Australia =

Motor rally competition

2018 Rally Australia: 27. Kennards Hire Rally Australia 2018
Round 13 of 13 in the 2018 World Rally Championship
← Previous event
- Host country: Australia
- Rally base: Coffs Harbour, New South Wales
- Dates run: 15 – 18 November 2018
- Start location: Coffs Harbour, New South Wales
- Finish location: Coramba, New South Wales
- Stages: 24 (316.30 km; 196.54 miles)
- Stage surface: Gravel
- Transport distance: 698.91 km (434.28 miles)
- Overall distance: 1,015.21 km (630.82 miles)

Statistics
- Crews registered: 29
- Crews: 25 at start, 15 at finish

Overall results
- Overall winner: (Finland) Jari-Matti Latvala (Finland) Miikka Anttila (Japan) Toyota Gazoo Racing WRT; 2:59:52.0
- Power Stage winner: (France) Sébastien Ogier (France) Julien Ingrassia (United Kingdom) M-Sport Ford WRT

Support category results
- WRC-2 winner: (Chile) Alberto Heller (Argentina) José Diaz (United Kingdom) M-Sport Ford WRT; 3:22:20.5
- WRC-3 winner: no classified finishers

The 2018 Rally Australia (formally known as the 27. Kennards Hire Rally Australia) was a motor racing event for rally cars that took place between 15 and 18 November. The event was open to entries competing in World Rally Cars and cars complying with Group R regulations. It marked the twenty-seventh running of Rally Australia and was the final round of the 2018 FIA World Rally Championship and its support series, the WRC-2 and WRC-3 championships. The 2018 event was based in Coffs Harbour in New South Wales and consisted of twenty-four special stages. The rally covered a total competitive distance of a 316.30 km (196.54 miles) and an additional 698.91 km (434.28 miles) in transport stages.

Thierry Neuville and Nicolas Gilsoul were the defending rally winners. The Finnish crew of Kalle Rovanperä and Jonne Halttunen were the reigning winners of the World Rally Championship-2, but did not enter the rally this year. There were no defending crews in the World Rally Championship-3 category since no crews entered here last year.

Jari-Matti Latvala and Miikka Anttila won their first rally victory since 2017 Rally Sweden. Their team, Toyota Gazoo Racing WRT, were the manufacturers' winners. The M-Sport Ford WRT crew of Alberto Heller and José Diaz won the World Rally Championship-2 category in a Škoda Fabia R5. In the World Rally Championship-3, there were no classified finishers.

Defending world champions Sébastien Ogier and Julien Ingrassia took fifth place, which was enough for them to secure their sixth consecutive drivers' and co-drivers' titles respectively. Following a win and a 4th-place finish, Toyota Gazoo Racing WRT won their first manufacturers' title since 1999. In the WRC-3 championships, Enrico Brazzoli and Luca Beltrame still secured the titles although the Italian crews retired from the event.

== Background ==
=== Championship standings prior to the event ===
Defending world champions Sébastien Ogier and Julien Ingrassia entered the round with a three-point lead over the defending rally winners Thierry Neuville and Nicolas Gilsoul. Ott Tänak and Martin Järveoja were third, a further twenty points behind. In the World Rally Championship for Manufacturers, Toyota Gazoo Racing WRT held a twelve-point lead over Hyundai Shell Mobis WRT.

In the World Rally Championship-2 standings, newly-crowned champions Jan Kopecký and Pavel Dresler lead the drivers' and co-drivers' standings by thirty-three points. Pontus Tidemand and Jonas Andersson were in second, while the Finnish crew of Kalle Rovanperä and Jonne Halttunen were another twenty-one points behind in third. However, all of them did not participate in the event. In the teams' championship, Škoda Motorsport II held a seventeen-point lead over sister team Škoda Motorsport.

In the World Rally Championship-3 standings, Enrico Brazzoli and Luca Beltrame held a slender one-point lead over Taisko Lario and Tatu Hämäläinen, while 2018 Junior World Rally champions Emil Bergkvist and Johan Johansson were in third, eleven and seventeen points further behind in the drivers' and co-drivers' standings respectively. In the teams' championship, ACI Team Italia led Castrol Ford Team Turkiye by sixteen points.

=== Entry list ===
The following crews were entered into the rally. The entry list consisted of twenty-nine crews, including twelve World Rally Car entries, four entries in the World Rally Championship-2 and two in the World Rally Championship-3.

No.	Entrant	Driver	Co-driver	Car	Group	Eligibility	Tyre
1	(United Kingdom) M-Sport Ford WRT	(France) Sébastien Ogier	(France) Julien Ingrassia	Ford Fiesta WRC	RC1	WRC manufacturer	M
2	(United Kingdom) M-Sport Ford WRT	(United Kingdom) Elfyn Evans	(United Kingdom) Daniel Barritt	Ford Fiesta WRC	RC1	WRC manufacturer	M
3	(United Kingdom) M-Sport Ford WRT	(Finland) Teemu Suninen	(Finland) Mikko Markkula	Ford Fiesta WRC	RC1	WRC manufacturer	M
4	(South Korea) Hyundai Shell Mobis WRT	(Norway) Andreas Mikkelsen	(Norway) Anders Jæger-Synnevaag	Hyundai i20 Coupe WRC	RC1	WRC manufacturer	M
5	(South Korea) Hyundai Shell Mobis WRT	(Belgium) Thierry Neuville	(Belgium) Nicolas Gilsoul	Hyundai i20 Coupe WRC	RC1	WRC manufacturer	M
6	(South Korea) Hyundai Shell Mobis WRT	(New Zealand) Hayden Paddon	(United Kingdom) Sebastian Marshall	Hyundai i20 Coupe WRC	RC1	WRC manufacturer	M
7	(Japan) Toyota Gazoo Racing WRT	(Finland) Jari-Matti Latvala	(Finland) Miikka Anttila	Toyota Yaris WRC	RC1	WRC manufacturer	M
8	(Japan) Toyota Gazoo Racing WRT	(Estonia) Ott Tänak	(Estonia) Martin Järveoja	Toyota Yaris WRC	RC1	WRC manufacturer	M
9	(Japan) Toyota Gazoo Racing WRT	(Finland) Esapekka Lappi	(Finland) Janne Ferm	Toyota Yaris WRC	RC1	WRC manufacturer	M
10	(France) Citroën Total Abu Dhabi WRT	(Norway) Mads Østberg	(Norway) Torstein Eriksen	Citroën C3 WRC	RC1	WRC manufacturer	M
11	(France) Citroën Total Abu Dhabi WRT	(Republic of Ireland) Craig Breen	(United Kingdom) Scott Martin	Citroën C3 WRC	RC1	WRC manufacturer	M
21	(United Kingdom) M-Sport Ford WRT	(Greece) Jourdan Serderidis	(Belgium) Lara Vanneste	Ford Fiesta WRC	RC1	WRC	M
31	(Chile) Pedro Heller	(Chile) Pedro Heller	(Argentina) Pablo Olmos	Ford Fiesta R5	RC2	WRC-2	M
32	(Italy) Motorsport Italia	(Germany) Armin Kremer	(Germany) Pirmin Winklhofer	Škoda Fabia R5	RC2	WRC-2	P
33	(United Kingdom) M-Sport Ford WRT	(Chile) Alberto Heller	(Argentina) José Diaz	Ford Fiesta R5	RC2	WRC-2	M
34	(Italy) Gianluca Linari	(Italy) Gianluca Linari	(Italy) Pietro Elia Ometto	Subaru Impreza WRX STi	RC2	WRC-2	P
61	(Italy) Enrico Brazzoli	(Italy) Enrico Brazzoli	(Italy) Luca Beltrame	Citroën DS3 R3	RC3	WRC-3	P
62	(United Kingdom) Louise Cook	(United Kingdom) Louise Cook	(United Kingdom) Stefan Davis	Citroën DS3 R3	RC3	WRC-3	M
71	(Australia) Eli Evans	(Australia) Eli Evans	(Australia) Ben Searcy	Škoda Fabia R5	RC2	—N/a	M
72	(Australia) Harry Bates	(Australia) Harry Bates	(Australia) John McCarthy	Toyota Yaris AP4	ASN	—N/a	M
73	(India) Team MRF Tyres	(India) Gaurav Gill	(Australia) Glenn MacNeall	Ford Fiesta R5	RC2	—N/a	M
74	(Australia) Steve Glenney	(Australia) Steve Glenney	(Australia) Andrew Sarandis	Škoda Fabia R5	RC2	—N/a	M
75	(Australia) Les Walkden Racing	(Australia) Molly Taylor	(New Zealand) Malcolm Read	Subaru Impreza WRX STi	ASN	—N/a	M
76	(New Zealand) Raana Horan	(New Zealand) Raana Horan	(New Zealand) Michael Connor	Škoda Fabia R5	RC2	—N/a	P
77	(Australia) Tony Sullens	(Australia) Tony Sullens	(Australia) Kaylie Newell	Citroën DS3 R3	RC3	—N/a	M
78	(Australia) Wayne Morton	(Australia) Wayne Morton	(Australia) Kirra Penny	Toyota Auris S2000	ASN	—N/a	M
79	(Japan) Atsushi Masumura	(Japan) Naoya Tanaka	(Japan) Super Alex Troop	Mitsubishi Lancer Evo X	RC2	—N/a	H
80	(Australia) Lewis Bates	(Australia) Lewis Bates	(Australia) Anthony McLoughlin	Toyota Corolla S2000	ASN	—N/a	M
81	(Australia) Luke Anear	(Australia) Luke Anear	(Australia) Jon Mitchell	Subaru Impreza WRX STi	ASN	—N/a	M

== Report ==
=== Leg 1 ===
Coming into Coffs Harbour, Sébastien Ogier was the championship leader. Being first on the road, he had to endured the lack of grip. He ended the day in seventh after title contender Thierry Neuville suffered a rear-left puncture in the second pass of Sherwood, which dropped him down to tenth overall. Another title rival Ott Tänak also had some issue. His Yaris' engine took on water in a river crossing, which tore the front aero from his car and affected its handling. The Estonian eventually finished in fifth overall, 16.9 seconds off the lead.

It was Mads Østberg and Craig Breen made full use of advantages of being late on the road that gave Citroën a 1–2. Jari-Matti Latvala was 1.9 seconds behind Breen in third, followed by Hayden Paddon, another 3.8 seconds behind in fourth. Esapekka Lappi recovered to sixth after of the same watersplash issue as Tänak's. Ford duo Elfyn Evans and Teemu Suninen completed the day in eighth and ninth respectively after giving positions to their defending world champion Ogier. Andreas Mikkelsen was the only major retirement of the leg. The Norwegian parked his i20 with suspected radiator damage after crashing into a ditch.

=== Leg 2 ===
Because of the puncture on Friday, Thierry Neuville was the first manufacturer car on the road. The Belgian managed to catch two places despite dry roads meant he was effectively high-speed road-sweepers, cleaning the surface of thick gravel to expose a faster line with more grip for those starting later. He eventually ended the leg in eighth, more than 50 seconds behind the title rival Sébastien Ogier, who kept his position in sixth after a trouble free day. Meanwhile, Ott Tänak set some brilliant pace, which elevated him to the top spot, around 20 seconds cleared of his teammate Jari-Matti Latvala. If the rally ends today, Ogier will win his sixth consecutive drivers' title with 212 points, while Tänak will snatch the runner-up spot from Neuville with an advantage of only one point in the championship standings.

Following two Toyotas, Hayden Paddon was in third, just 4.4 seconds off Latvala. Mads Østberg came into the day as the rally leader, but he was struggled with his Citroën C3’s balance in the afternoon loop. The Norwegian completed the day in fourth, just edged Esapekka Lappi by 3.8 seconds. Teammate Craig Breen fared worse — He spun into a bank and damaged his rear suspension, which dropped him down to tenth overall. Seventh-place Elfyn Evans provided a convenient buffer between Ogier and Neuville, with teammate Teemu Suninen finished the leg in ninth.

=== Leg 3 ===
It turned out the final leg of the season was a total disaster for two title contenders Thierry Neuville and Ott Tänak. Neuville, who led the championship for most of the year, clipped a bank and a tree on SS22 and forced to retire. One stage later, Tänak stopped because of the damage to transmission. Following two title rivals' retirements, Sébastien Ogier successfully won his sixth drivers' title with a fifth-place finish. Toyota's Jari-Matti Latvala won the rally, which helped the team to win their first manufacturers' title for the first time since 1999. Hayden Paddon and Mads Østberg rounded out of the podium, followed by Esapekka Lappi in a third Yaris. Elfyn Evans completed the event in sixth after teammate Ogier, while Craig Breen gained one place from Teemu Suninen, who retired his Fiesta before the final test following an impact in the previous stage. WRC-2 category winner Alberto Heller, local driver Steve Glenney and rally veteran Jourdan Serderidis covered out of the leaderboard.

== Classification ==
=== Final results ===
Pos.	No.	Driver	Co-driver	Entrant	Car	Class	Time	Difference	
Pos.	No.	Driver	Co-driver	Entrant	Car	Class	Time	to 1st	to prev.
1	7	(Finland) Jari-Matti Latvala	(Finland) Miikka Anttila	(Japan) Toyota Gazoo Racing WRT	Toyota Yaris WRC	WRC	2:59:52.0	0.0	0.0
2	6	(New Zealand) Hayden Paddon	(United Kingdom) Sebastian Marshall	(South Korea) Hyundai Shell Mobis WRT	Hyundai i20 Coupe WRC	WRC	3:00:24.5	+32.5	+32.5
3	10	(Norway) Mads Østberg	(Norway) Torstein Eriksen	(France) Citroën Total Abu Dhabi WRT	Citroën C3 WRC	WRC	3:00:44.2	+52.2	+19.7
4	9	(Finland) Esapekka Lappi	(Finland) Janne Ferm	(Japan) Toyota Gazoo Racing WRT	Toyota Yaris WRC	WRC	3:00:54.3	+1:02.3	+10.1
5	1	(France) Sébastien Ogier	(France) Julien Ingrassia	(United Kingdom) M-Sport Ford WRT	Ford Fiesta WRC	WRC	3:02:22.8	+2:30.8	+1:28.5
6	2	(United Kingdom) Elfyn Evans	(United Kingdom) Daniel Barritt	(United Kingdom) M-Sport Ford WRT	Ford Fiesta WRC	WRC	3:02:22.8	+3:05.1	+34.3
7	11	(Republic of Ireland) Craig Breen	(United Kingdom) Scott Martin	(France) Citroën Total Abu Dhabi WRT	Citroën C3 WRC	WRC	3:08:51.0	+8:59.0	+5:53.9
8	33	(Chile) Alberto Heller	(Argentina) José Diaz	(United Kingdom) M-Sport Ford WRT	Ford Fiesta R5	WRC-2	3:22:20.5	+22:28.5	+13:29.5
9	74	(Australia) Steve Glenney	(Australia) Andrew Sarandis	(Australia) Steve Glenney	Škoda Fabia R5	—N/a	3:26:53.8	+27:01.8	+4:33.3
10	21	(Greece) Jourdan Serderidis	(Belgium) Lara Vanneste	(United Kingdom) M-Sport Ford WRT	Ford Fiesta WRC	WRC	3:35:06.1	+35:14.1	+8:12.3
11	4	(Norway) Andreas Mikkelsen	(Norway) Anders Jæger-Synnevaag	(South Korea) Hyundai Shell Mobis WRT	Hyundai i20 Coupe WRC	WRC	3:43:13.9	+43:21.9	+8:07.8
12	34	(Italy) Gianluca Linari	(Italy) Pietro Elia Ometto	(Italy) Gianluca Linari	Subaru Impreza WRX STi	WRC-2	3:49:40.4	+49:48.4	+6:26.5
13	71	(Australia) Eli Evans	(Australia) Ben Searcy	(Australia) Eli Evans	Škoda Fabia R5	—N/a	4:05:03.5	+1:05:11.5	+15:23.1
14	80	(Australia) Lewis Bates	(Australia) Anthony McLoughlin	(Australia) Lewis Bates	Toyota Corolla S2000	—N/a	4:13:38.8	+1:13:46.8	+8:35.3
15	73	(India) Gaurav Gill	(Australia) Glenn MacNeall	(India) Team MRF Tyres	Ford Fiesta R5	—N/a	4:14:20.0	+1:14:28.0	+41.2
Ret	8	(Estonia) Ott Tänak	(Estonia) Martin Järveoja	(Japan) Toyota Gazoo Racing WRT	Toyota Yaris WRC	WRC	Retired SS23		
Ret	3	(Finland) Teemu Suninen	(Finland) Mikko Markkula	(United Kingdom) M-Sport Ford WRT	Ford Fiesta WRC	WRC	Retired SS23		
Ret	5	(Belgium) Thierry Neuville	(Belgium) Nicolas Gilsoul	(South Korea) Hyundai Shell Mobis WRT	Hyundai i20 Coupe WRC	WRC	Retired SS22		
Ret	32	(Germany) Armin Kremer	(Germany) Pirmin Winklhofer	(Italy) Motorsport Italia	Škoda Fabia R5	WRC-2	Retired SS21		
Ret	31	(Chile) Pedro Heller	(Argentina) Pablo Olmos	(Chile) Pedro Heller	Ford Fiesta R5	WRC-2	Retired SS20		
Ret	76	(New Zealand) Raana Horan	(New Zealand) Michael Connor	(New Zealand) Raana Horan	Škoda Fabia R5	—N/a	Retired SS19		
Ret	78	(Australia) Wayne Morton	(Australia) Kirra Penny	(Australia) Wayne Morton	Toyota Auris S2000	—N/a	Retired SS19		
Ret	79	(Japan) Naoya Tanaka	(Japan) Super Alex Troop	(Japan) Atsushi Masumura	Mitsubishi Lancer Evo X	—N/a	Retired SS19		
Ret	61	(Italy) Enrico Brazzoli	(Italy) Luca Beltrame	(Italy) Enrico Brazzoli	Citroën DS3 R3	WRC-3	Retired SS14		
Ret	72	(Australia) Harry Bates	(Australia) John McCarthy	(Australia) Harry Bates	Toyota Yaris AP4	—N/a	Retired SS14		
DNS	62	(United Kingdom) Louise Cook	(United Kingdom) Stefan Davis	(United Kingdom) Louise Cook	Citroën DS3 R3	WRC-3	Did not start		
DNS	75	(Australia) Molly Taylor	(New Zealand) Malcolm Read	(Australia) Les Walkden Racing	Subaru Impreza WRX STi	—N/a	Did not start		
DNS	77	(Australia) Tony Sullens	(Australia) Kaylie Newell	(Australia) Tony Sullens	Citroën DS3 R3	—N/a	Did not start		
DNS	81	(Australia) Luke Anear	(Australia) Jon Mitchell	(Australia) Luke Anear	Subaru Impreza WRX STi	—N/a	Did not start		

=== Point scorers ===
Pos.	No.	Driver	Co-driver	Entrant	Car	Class	Points
1	7	(Finland) Jari-Matti Latvala	(Finland) Miikka Anttila	(Japan) Toyota Gazoo Racing WRT	Toyota Yaris WRC	WRC	**25** in WRC, **1** from Power Stage
2	6	(New Zealand) Hayden Paddon	(United Kingdom) Sebastian Marshall	(South Korea) Hyundai Shell Mobis WRT	Hyundai i20 Coupe WRC	WRC	**18** in WRC, **0** from Power Stage
3	10	(Norway) Mads Østberg	(Norway) Torstein Eriksen	(France) Citroën Total Abu Dhabi WRT	Citroën C3 WRC	WRC	**15** in WRC, **3** from Power Stage
4	9	(Finland) Esapekka Lappi	(Finland) Janne Ferm	(Japan) Toyota Gazoo Racing WRT	Toyota Yaris WRC	WRC	**12** in WRC, **4** from Power Stage
5	1	(France) Sébastien Ogier	(France) Julien Ingrassia	(United Kingdom) M-Sport Ford WRT	Ford Fiesta WRC	WRC	**10** in WRC, **5** from Power Stage
6	2	(United Kingdom) Elfyn Evans	(United Kingdom) Daniel Barritt	(United Kingdom) M-Sport Ford WRT	Ford Fiesta WRC	WRC	**8** in WRC, **2** from Power Stage
7	11	(Republic of Ireland) Craig Breen	(United Kingdom) Scott Martin	(France) Citroën Total Abu Dhabi WRT	Citroën C3 WRC	WRC	**6** in WRC, **0** from Power Stage
8	33	(Chile) Alberto Heller	(Argentina) José Diaz	(United Kingdom) M-Sport Ford WRT	Ford Fiesta R5	WRC-2	**4** in WRC, **25** in WRC-2
9	74	(Australia) Steve Glenney	(Australia) Andrew Sarandis	(Australia) Steve Glenney	Škoda Fabia R5	—N/a	**2** in WRC
10	21	(Greece) Jourdan Serderidis	(Belgium) Lara Vanneste	(United Kingdom) M-Sport Ford WRT	Ford Fiesta WRC	WRC	**1** in WRC, **0** from Power Stage
12	34	(Italy) Gianluca Linari	(Italy) Pietro Elia Ometto	(Italy) Gianluca Linari	Subaru Impreza WRX STi	WRC-2	**18** in WRC-2

=== Special stages ===
**Overall classification**
Day	Stage	Name	Length	Stage winners	Car	Time	Class leaders
15 November	—	Bucca [Shakedown]	5.07 km	(France) Sébastien Ogier — (France) Julien Ingrassia	Ford Fiesta WRC	2:53.8	—N/a
16 November	SS1	Orara East 1	8.77 km	(Finland) Esapekka Lappi — (Finland) Janne Ferm	Toyota Yaris WRC	4:45.5	(Finland) Esapekka Lappi — (Finland) Janne Ferm
16 November	SS2	Coldwater 1	14.12 km	(Finland) Jari-Matti Latvala — (Finland) Miikka Anttila	Toyota Yaris WRC	7:56.3	(Finland) Jari-Matti Latvala — (Finland) Miikka Anttila (Finland) Esapekka Lappi — (Finland) Janne Ferm
16 November	SS3	Sherwood 1	26.68 km	(Norway) Mads Østberg — (Norway) Torstein Eriksen	Citroën C3 WRC	12:49.0	(Norway) Mads Østberg — (Norway) Torstein Eriksen
16 November	SS4	Orara East 2	8.77 km	(Estonia) Ott Tänak — (Estonia) Martin Järveoja	Toyota Yaris WRC	4:43.5	(Norway) Mads Østberg — (Norway) Torstein Eriksen
16 November	SS5	Coldwater 2	14.12 km	(Belgium) Thierry Neuville — (Belgium) Nicolas Gilsoul	Hyundai i20 Coupe WRC	7:51.1	(Norway) Mads Østberg — (Norway) Torstein Eriksen
16 November	SS6	Sherwood 2	26.68 km	(Republic of Ireland) Craig Breen — (United Kingdom) Scott Martin	Citroën C3 WRC	12:35.6	(Norway) Mads Østberg — (Norway) Torstein Eriksen
16 November	SS7	Destination NSW SSS18 1	1.27 km	(France) Sébastien Ogier — (France) Julien Ingrassia	Ford Fiesta WRC	1:23.4	(Norway) Mads Østberg — (Norway) Torstein Eriksen
16 November	SS8	Destination NSW SSS18 2	1.27 km	(Estonia) Ott Tänak — (Estonia) Martin Järveoja	Toyota Yaris WRC	1:23.0	(Norway) Mads Østberg — (Norway) Torstein Eriksen
17 November	SS9	Argents Hill Reverse 1	13.13 km	(New Zealand) Hayden Paddon — (United Kingdom) Sebastian Marshall	Hyundai i20 Coupe WRC	7:20.9	(Norway) Mads Østberg — (Norway) Torstein Eriksen
17 November	SS10	Welshs Creek Reverse 1	28.83 km	(Estonia) Ott Tänak — (Estonia) Martin Järveoja	Toyota Yaris WRC	15:12.6	(Norway) Mads Østberg — (Norway) Torstein Eriksen
17 November	SS11	Urunga 1	20.11 km	(Estonia) Ott Tänak — (Estonia) Martin Järveoja	Toyota Yaris WRC	11:32.3	(Finland) Jari-Matti Latvala — (Finland) Miikka Anttila
17 November	SS12	Raleigh 1	1.99 km	(United Kingdom) Elfyn Evans — (United Kingdom) Daniel Barritt (Estonia) Ott Tänak — (Estonia) Martin Järveoja	Ford Fiesta WRC; Toyota Yaris WRC	1:33.1	(Finland) Jari-Matti Latvala — (Finland) Miikka Anttila
17 November	SS13	Argents Hill Reverse 2	13.13 km	(New Zealand) Hayden Paddon — (United Kingdom) Sebastian Marshall	Hyundai i20 Coupe WRC	7:16.8	(Finland) Jari-Matti Latvala — (Finland) Miikka Anttila
17 November	SS14	Welshs Creek Reverse 2	28.83 km	(Estonia) Ott Tänak — (Estonia) Martin Järveoja	Toyota Yaris WRC	15:01.4	(Estonia) Ott Tänak — (Estonia) Martin Järveoja
17 November	SS15	Urunga 2	20.11 km	(Finland) Esapekka Lappi — (Finland) Janne Ferm	Toyota Yaris WRC	11:32.5	(Estonia) Ott Tänak — (Estonia) Martin Järveoja
17 November	SS16	Raleigh 2	1.99 km	(Estonia) Ott Tänak — (Estonia) Martin Järveoja	Toyota Yaris WRC	1:32.2	(Estonia) Ott Tänak — (Estonia) Martin Järveoja
17 November	SS17	Destination NSW SSS18 3	1.27 km	(Estonia) Ott Tänak — (Estonia) Martin Järveoja	Toyota Yaris WRC	1:23.1	(Estonia) Ott Tänak — (Estonia) Martin Järveoja
17 November	SS18	Destination NSW SSS18 4	1.27 km	(Belgium) Thierry Neuville — (Belgium) Nicolas Gilsoul	Hyundai i20 Coupe WRC	1:24.1	(Estonia) Ott Tänak — (Estonia) Martin Järveoja
18 November	SS19	Coramba 1	15.55 km	(Finland) Jari-Matti Latvala — (Finland) Miikka Anttila	Toyota Yaris WRC	9:38.1	(Estonia) Ott Tänak — (Estonia) Martin Järveoja
18 November	SS20	Sapphire 1	19.27 km	(New Zealand) Hayden Paddon — (United Kingdom) Sebastian Marshall	Hyundai i20 Coupe WRC	11:30.2	(Finland) Jari-Matti Latvala — (Finland) Miikka Anttila
18 November	SS21	Wedding Bells18 1	7.16 km	(Finland) Esapekka Lappi — (Finland) Janne Ferm	Toyota Yaris WRC	4:14.9	(Finland) Jari-Matti Latvala — (Finland) Miikka Anttila
18 November	SS22	Coramba 2	15.55 km	(Finland) Jari-Matti Latvala — (Finland) Miikka Anttila	Toyota Yaris WRC	10:05.1	(Finland) Jari-Matti Latvala — (Finland) Miikka Anttila
18 November	SS23	Sapphire 2	19.27 km	(Finland) Jari-Matti Latvala — (Finland) Miikka Anttila	Toyota Yaris WRC	11:48.1	(Finland) Jari-Matti Latvala — (Finland) Miikka Anttila
18 November	SS24	Wedding Bells18 2 [Power stage]	7.16 km	(France) Sébastien Ogier — (France) Julien Ingrassia	Ford Fiesta WRC	4:16.2	(Finland) Jari-Matti Latvala — (Finland) Miikka Anttila
**World Rally Championship-2**
15 November	—	Bucca [Shakedown]	5.07 km	(Chile) Alberto Heller — (Argentina) José Diaz	Ford Fiesta R5	3:08.9	—N/a
16 November	SS1	Orara East 1	8.77 km	(Chile) Alberto Heller — (Argentina) José Diaz	Ford Fiesta R5	5:12.9	(Chile) Alberto Heller — (Argentina) José Diaz
16 November	SS2	Coldwater 1	14.12 km	(Chile) Alberto Heller — (Argentina) José Diaz	Ford Fiesta R5	8:42.3	(Chile) Alberto Heller — (Argentina) José Diaz
16 November	SS3	Sherwood 1	26.68 km	(Chile) Alberto Heller — (Argentina) José Diaz	Ford Fiesta R5	14:27.5	(Chile) Alberto Heller — (Argentina) José Diaz
16 November	SS4	Orara East 2	8.77 km	(Chile) Alberto Heller — (Argentina) José Diaz	Ford Fiesta R5	5:07.3	(Chile) Alberto Heller — (Argentina) José Diaz
16 November	SS5	Coldwater 2	14.12 km	(Chile) Alberto Heller — (Argentina) José Diaz	Ford Fiesta R5	8:32.3	(Chile) Alberto Heller — (Argentina) José Diaz
16 November	SS6	Sherwood 2	26.68 km	(Chile) Alberto Heller — (Argentina) José Diaz	Ford Fiesta R5	14:06.4	(Chile) Alberto Heller — (Argentina) José Diaz
16 November	SS7	Destination NSW SSS18 1	1.27 km	(Germany) Armin Kremer — (Germany) Pirmin Winklhofer	Škoda Fabia R5	1:29.0	(Chile) Alberto Heller — (Argentina) José Diaz
16 November	SS8	Destination NSW SSS18 2	1.27 km	(Chile) Pedro Heller — (Argentina) Pablo Olmos	Ford Fiesta R5	1:27.3	(Chile) Alberto Heller — (Argentina) José Diaz
17 November	SS9	Argents Hill Reverse 1	13.13 km	(Chile) Alberto Heller — (Argentina) José Diaz	Ford Fiesta R5	8:00.9	(Chile) Alberto Heller — (Argentina) José Diaz
17 November	SS10	Welshs Creek Reverse 1	28.83 km	(Chile) Alberto Heller — (Argentina) José Diaz	Ford Fiesta R5	16:46.0	(Chile) Alberto Heller — (Argentina) José Diaz
17 November	SS11	Urunga 1	20.11 km	(Chile) Alberto Heller — (Argentina) José Diaz	Ford Fiesta R5	12:55.0	(Chile) Alberto Heller — (Argentina) José Diaz
17 November	SS12	Raleigh 1	1.99 km	(Germany) Armin Kremer — (Germany) Pirmin Winklhofer	Škoda Fabia R5	1:38.0	(Chile) Alberto Heller — (Argentina) José Diaz
17 November	SS13	Argents Hill Reverse 2	13.13 km	(Chile) Alberto Heller — (Argentina) José Diaz	Ford Fiesta R5	7:55.1	(Chile) Alberto Heller — (Argentina) José Diaz
17 November	SS14	Welshs Creek Reverse 2	28.83 km	(Chile) Alberto Heller — (Argentina) José Diaz	Ford Fiesta R5	16:40.7	(Chile) Alberto Heller — (Argentina) José Diaz
17 November	SS15	Urunga 2	20.11 km	(Chile) Alberto Heller — (Argentina) José Diaz	Ford Fiesta R5	12:52.7	(Chile) Alberto Heller — (Argentina) José Diaz
17 November	SS16	Raleigh 2	1.99 km	(Chile) Alberto Heller — (Argentina) José Diaz	Ford Fiesta R5	1:38.0	(Chile) Alberto Heller — (Argentina) José Diaz
17 November	SS17	Destination NSW SSS18 3	1.27 km	(Chile) Alberto Heller — (Argentina) José Diaz	Ford Fiesta R5	1:28.2	(Chile) Alberto Heller — (Argentina) José Diaz
17 November	SS18	Destination NSW SSS18 4	1.27 km	(Chile) Alberto Heller — (Argentina) José Diaz	Ford Fiesta R5	1:27.2	(Chile) Alberto Heller — (Argentina) José Diaz
18 November	SS19	Coramba 1	15.55 km	(Chile) Pedro Heller — (Argentina) Pablo Olmos	Ford Fiesta R5	10:46.5	(Chile) Alberto Heller — (Argentina) José Diaz
18 November	SS20	Sapphire 1	19.27 km	(Chile) Alberto Heller — (Argentina) José Diaz	Ford Fiesta R5	13:07.3	(Chile) Alberto Heller — (Argentina) José Diaz
18 November	SS21	Wedding Bells18 1	7.16 km	(Chile) Alberto Heller — (Argentina) José Diaz	Ford Fiesta R5	5:14.7	(Chile) Alberto Heller — (Argentina) José Diaz
18 November	SS22	Coramba 2	15.55 km	(Chile) Alberto Heller — (Argentina) José Diaz	Ford Fiesta R5	12:32.6	(Chile) Alberto Heller — (Argentina) José Diaz
18 November	SS23	Sapphire 2	19.27 km	(Chile) Alberto Heller — (Argentina) José Diaz	Ford Fiesta R5	15:01.2	(Chile) Alberto Heller — (Argentina) José Diaz
18 November	SS24	Wedding Bells18 2	7.16 km	(Chile) Alberto Heller — (Argentina) José Diaz	Ford Fiesta R5	4:52.3	(Chile) Alberto Heller — (Argentina) José Diaz
**World Rally Championship-3**
15 November	—	Bucca [Shakedown]	5.07 km	(Italy) Enrico Brazzoli — (Italy) Luca Beltrame	Citroën DS3 R3	3:48.6	—N/a
16 November	SS1	Orara East 1	8.77 km	(Italy) Enrico Brazzoli — (Italy) Luca Beltrame	Citroën DS3 R3	6:40.5	(Italy) Enrico Brazzoli — (Italy) Luca Beltrame
16 November	SS2	Coldwater 1	14.12 km	(Italy) Enrico Brazzoli — (Italy) Luca Beltrame	Citroën DS3 R3	10:23.4	(Italy) Enrico Brazzoli — (Italy) Luca Beltrame
16 November	SS3	Sherwood 1	26.68 km	(Italy) Enrico Brazzoli — (Italy) Luca Beltrame	Citroën DS3 R3	18:08.6	(Italy) Enrico Brazzoli — (Italy) Luca Beltrame
16 November	SS4	Orara East 2	8.77 km	(Italy) Enrico Brazzoli — (Italy) Luca Beltrame	Citroën DS3 R3	6:04.6	(Italy) Enrico Brazzoli — (Italy) Luca Beltrame
16 November	SS5	Coldwater 2	14.12 km	(Italy) Enrico Brazzoli — (Italy) Luca Beltrame	Citroën DS3 R3	10:12.7	(Italy) Enrico Brazzoli — (Italy) Luca Beltrame
16 November	SS6	Sherwood 2	26.68 km	(Italy) Enrico Brazzoli — (Italy) Luca Beltrame	Citroën DS3 R3	25:08.6	(Italy) Enrico Brazzoli — (Italy) Luca Beltrame
16 November	SS7	Destination NSW SSS18 1	1.27 km	**No stage-winner**		—N/a	(Italy) Enrico Brazzoli — (Italy) Luca Beltrame
16 November	SS8	Destination NSW SSS18 2	1.27 km	**No stage-winner**		—N/a	(Italy) Enrico Brazzoli — (Italy) Luca Beltrame
17 November	SS9	Argents Hill Reverse 1	13.13 km	(Italy) Enrico Brazzoli — (Italy) Luca Beltrame	Citroën DS3 R3	9:24.8	(Italy) Enrico Brazzoli — (Italy) Luca Beltrame
17 November	SS10	Welshs Creek Reverse 1	28.83 km	(Italy) Enrico Brazzoli — (Italy) Luca Beltrame	Citroën DS3 R3	19:01.0	(Italy) Enrico Brazzoli — (Italy) Luca Beltrame
17 November	SS11	Urunga 1	20.11 km	(Italy) Enrico Brazzoli — (Italy) Luca Beltrame	Citroën DS3 R3	15:03.4	(Italy) Enrico Brazzoli — (Italy) Luca Beltrame
17 November	SS12	Raleigh 1	1.99 km	(Italy) Enrico Brazzoli — (Italy) Luca Beltrame	Citroën DS3 R3	1:49.8	(Italy) Enrico Brazzoli — (Italy) Luca Beltrame
17 November	SS13	Argents Hill Reverse 2	13.13 km	(Italy) Enrico Brazzoli — (Italy) Luca Beltrame	Citroën DS3 R3	9:10.3	(Italy) Enrico Brazzoli — (Italy) Luca Beltrame
17 November	SS14	Welshs Creek Reverse 2	28.83 km	**No stage-winner**		—N/a	**No leader**
17 November	SS15	Urunga 2	20.11 km	**No stage-winner**		—N/a	**No leader**
17 November	SS16	Raleigh 2	1.99 km	**No stage-winner**		—N/a	**No leader**
17 November	SS17	Destination NSW SSS18 3	1.27 km	**No stage-winner**		—N/a	**No leader**
17 November	SS18	Destination NSW SSS18 4	1.27 km	**No stage-winner**		—N/a	**No leader**
18 November	SS19	Coramba 1	15.55 km	**No stage-winner**		—N/a	**No leader**
18 November	SS20	Sapphire 1	19.27 km	**No stage-winner**		—N/a	**No leader**
18 November	SS21	Wedding Bells18 1	7.16 km	**No stage-winner**		—N/a	**No leader**
18 November	SS22	Coramba 2	15.55 km	**No stage-winner**		—N/a	**No leader**
18 November	SS23	Sapphire 2	19.27 km	**No stage-winner**		—N/a	**No leader**
18 November	SS24	Wedding Bells18 2	7.16 km	**No stage-winner**		—N/a	**No leader**

=== Power stage ===
The Power stage was a 7.16 km stage at the end of the rally. Additional World Championship points were awarded to the five fastest crews.

Pos.	Driver	Co-driver	Car	Time	Diff.	Pts.
1	(France) Sébastien Ogier	(France) Julien Ingrassia	Ford Fiesta WRC	4:16.2	0.0	**5**
2	(Finland) Esapekka Lappi	(Finland) Janne Ferm	Toyota Yaris WRC	4:16.3	+0.1	**4**
3	(Norway) Mads Østberg	(Norway) Torstein Eriksen	Citroën C3 WRC	4:18.9	+2.7	**3**
4	(United Kingdom) Elfyn Evans	(United Kingdom) Daniel Barritt	Ford Fiesta WRC	4:19.2	+3.0	**2**
5	(Finland) Jari-Matti Latvala	(Finland) Miikka Anttila	Toyota Yaris WRC	4:20.4	+4.2	**1**

=== Penalties ===
The following crews were given time penalties during the rally.

Stage	No.	Driver	Co-driver	Entrant	Car	Class	Reason	Penalty
SS5	79	(Japan) Naoya Tanaka	(Japan) Super Alex Troop	(Japan) Atsushi Masumura	Mitsubishi Lancer Evo X	—N/a	13 minutes late	2:10
SS8	76	(New Zealand) Raana Horan	(New Zealand) Michael Connor	(New Zealand) Raana Horan	Škoda Fabia R5	—N/a	1 minute late	0:10
SS9	72	(Australia) Harry Bates	(Australia) John McCarthy	(Australia) Harry Bates	Toyota Yaris AP4	—N/a	4 minutes late	0:40
SS9	76	(New Zealand) Raana Horan	(New Zealand) Michael Connor	(New Zealand) Raana Horan	Škoda Fabia R5	—N/a	17 minutes late	2:50
SS9	78	(Australia) Wayne Morton	(Australia) Kirra Penny	(Australia) Wayne Morton	Toyota Auris S2000	—N/a	13 minutes late	2:10
SS10	78	(Australia) Wayne Morton	(Australia) Kirra Penny	(Australia) Wayne Morton	Toyota Auris S2000	—N/a	Jump start	0:10
SS12	11	(Republic of Ireland) Craig Breen	(United Kingdom) Scott Martin	(France) Citroën Total Abu Dhabi WRT	Citroën C3 WRC	WRC	23 minutes late	3:50
SS17	11	(Republic of Ireland) Craig Breen	(United Kingdom) Scott Martin	(France) Citroën Total Abu Dhabi WRT	Citroën C3 WRC	WRC	1 minute late	0:10

=== Retirements ===
The following crews retired from the event. Under Rally2 regulations, they were eligible to re-enter the event starting from the next leg. Crews that re-entered were given an additional time penalty.

Stage	No.	Driver	Co-driver	Entrant	Car	Class	Cause	Re-entry
SS3	4	(Norway) Andreas Mikkelsen	(Norway) Anders Jæger-Synnevaag	(South Korea) Hyundai Shell Mobis WRT	Hyundai i20 Coupe WRC	WRC	Rolled	Yes
SS3	71	(Australia) Eli Evans	(Australia) Ben Searcy	(Australia) Eli Evans	Škoda Fabia R5	—N/a	Mechanical	Yes
SS3	80	(Australia) Lewis Bates	(Australia) Anthony McLoughlin	(Australia) Lewis Bates	Toyota Corolla S2000	—N/a	Mechanical	Yes
SS6	61	(Italy) Enrico Brazzoli	(Italy) Luca Beltrame	(Italy) Enrico Brazzoli	Citroën DS3 R3	WRC-3	Mechanical	Yes
SS8	79	(Japan) Naoya Tanaka	(Japan) Super Alex Troop	(Japan) Atsushi Masumura	Mitsubishi Lancer Evo X	—N/a	Mechanical	Yes
SS9	79	(Japan) Naoya Tanaka	(Japan) Super Alex Troop	(Japan) Atsushi Masumura	Mitsubishi Lancer Evo X	—N/a	Mechanical	Yes
SS10	31	(Chile) Pedro Heller	(Argentina) Pablo Olmos	(Chile) Pedro Heller	Ford Fiesta R5	WRC-2	Mechanical	Yes
SS11	73	(India) Gaurav Gill	(Australia) Glenn MacNeall	(India) Team MRF Tyres	Ford Fiesta R5	—N/a	Mechanical	Yes
SS14	61	(Italy) Enrico Brazzoli	(Italy) Luca Beltrame	(Italy) Enrico Brazzoli	Citroën DS3 R3	WRC-3	Accident	No
SS14	72	(Australia) Harry Bates	(Australia) John McCarthy	(Australia) Harry Bates	Toyota Yaris AP4	—N/a	Engine	No
SS14	76	(New Zealand) Raana Horan	(New Zealand) Michael Connor	(New Zealand) Raana Horan	Škoda Fabia R5	—N/a	Mechanical	Yes
SS16	32	(Germany) Armin Kremer	(Germany) Pirmin Winklhofer	(Italy) Motorsport Italia	Škoda Fabia R5	WRC-2	Mechanical	Yes
SS19	76	(New Zealand) Raana Horan	(New Zealand) Michael Connor	(New Zealand) Raana Horan	Škoda Fabia R5	—N/a	Mechanical	No
SS19	78	(Australia) Wayne Morton	(Australia) Kirra Penny	(Australia) Wayne Morton	Toyota Auris S2000	—N/a	Accident	No
SS19	79	(Japan) Naoya Tanaka	(Japan) Super Alex Troop	(Japan) Atsushi Masumura	Mitsubishi Lancer Evo X	—N/a	Mechanical	No
SS20	31	(Chile) Pedro Heller	(Argentina) Pablo Olmos	(Chile) Pedro Heller	Ford Fiesta R5	WRC-2	Mechanical	No
SS21	32	(Germany) Armin Kremer	(Germany) Pirmin Winklhofer	(Italy) Motorsport Italia	Škoda Fabia R5	WRC-2	Mechanical	No
SS22	5	(Belgium) Thierry Neuville	(Belgium) Nicolas Gilsoul	(South Korea) Hyundai Shell Mobis WRT	Hyundai i20 Coupe WRC	WRC	Lost wheel	No
SS23	3	(Finland) Teemu Suninen	(Finland) Mikko Markkula	(United Kingdom) M-Sport Ford WRT	Ford Fiesta WRC	WRC	Mechanical	No
SS23	8	(Estonia) Ott Tänak	(Estonia) Martin Järveoja	(Japan) Toyota Gazoo Racing WRT	Toyota Yaris WRC	WRC	Accident	No

=== Championship standings after the rally ===
- **Bold text** indicates 2018 World Champions.

==== Drivers' championships ====
**World Rally Championship**
	Pos.	Driver	Points
	1	**(France) Sébastien Ogier**	219
	2	(Belgium) Thierry Neuville	201
	3	(Estonia) Ott Tänak	181
1	4	(Finland) Jari-Matti Latvala	128
1	5	(Finland) Esapekka Lappi	126
**World Rally Championship-2**
	Pos.	Driver	Points
	1	**(Czech Republic) Jan Kopecký**	143
	2	(Sweden) Pontus Tidemand	111
	3	(Finland) Kalle Rovanperä	90
	4	(United Kingdom) Gus Greensmith	70
	5	(Poland) Łukasz Pieniążek	56
**World Rally Championship-3**
	Pos.	Driver	Points
	1	**(Italy) Enrico Brazzoli**	98
	2	(Finland) Taisko Lario	97
	3	(Sweden) Emil Bergkvist	86
	4	(Sweden) Denis Rådström	80
	5	(France) Jean-Baptiste Franceschi	79

==== Co-drivers' championships ====
**World Rally Championship**
	Pos.	Co-driver	Points
	1	**(France) Julien Ingrassia**	219
	2	(Belgium) Nicolas Gilsoul	201
	3	(Estonia) Martin Järveoja	181
1	4	(Finland) Miikka Anttila	128
1	5	(Finland) Janne Ferm	126
**World Rally Championship-2**
	Pos.	Co-driver	Points
	1	**(Czech Republic) Pavel Dresler**	143
	2	(Sweden) Jonas Andersson	111
	3	(Finland) Jonne Halttunen	90
	4	(Poland) Przemysław Mazur	56
	5	(United Kingdom) Craig Parry	55
**World Rally Championship-3**
	Pos.	Co-driver	Points
	1	**(Italy) Luca Beltrame**	98
	2	(Finland) Tatu Hämäläinen	97
	3	(Sweden) Johan Johansson	80
	4	(France) Romain Courbon	79
	5	(United Kingdom) Stefan Davis	59

==== Manufacturers' and teams' championships ====
**World Rally Championship**
Pos.	Manufacturer	Points
1	**(Japan) Toyota Gazoo Racing WRT**	368
2	(South Korea) Hyundai Shell Mobis WRT	341
3	(United Kingdom) M-Sport Ford WRT	324
4	(France) Citroën Total Abu Dhabi WRT	237
**World Rally Championship-2**
Pos.	Team	Points
1	**(Czech Republic) Škoda Motorsport II**	150
2	(Czech Republic) Škoda Motorsport	133
3	(Finland) Printsport	81
4	(Italy) ACI Team Italia WRC	80
5	(South Korea) Hyundai Motorsport	76
**World Rally Championship-3**
Pos.	Team	Points
1	**(Italy) ACI Team Italia**	83
2	(Turkey) Castrol Ford Team Turkiye	67
3	(Estonia) OT Racing	62
4	(Germany) ADAC Sachsen	62
5	Équipe de France FFSA Rally	55

Previous rally: 2018 Rally Catalunya	2018 FIA World Rally Championship	Next rally: 2019 Monte Carlo Rally (2019)
Previous rally: 2017 Rally Australia	2018 Rally Australia	Next rally: TBD; 2019 edition cancelled
