= 2022 Rally New Zealand =

45th edition of Rally New Zealand

2022 Rally New Zealand Repco Rally New Zealand 2022
Round 11 of 13 in the 2022 World Rally Championship
← Previous event	Next event →
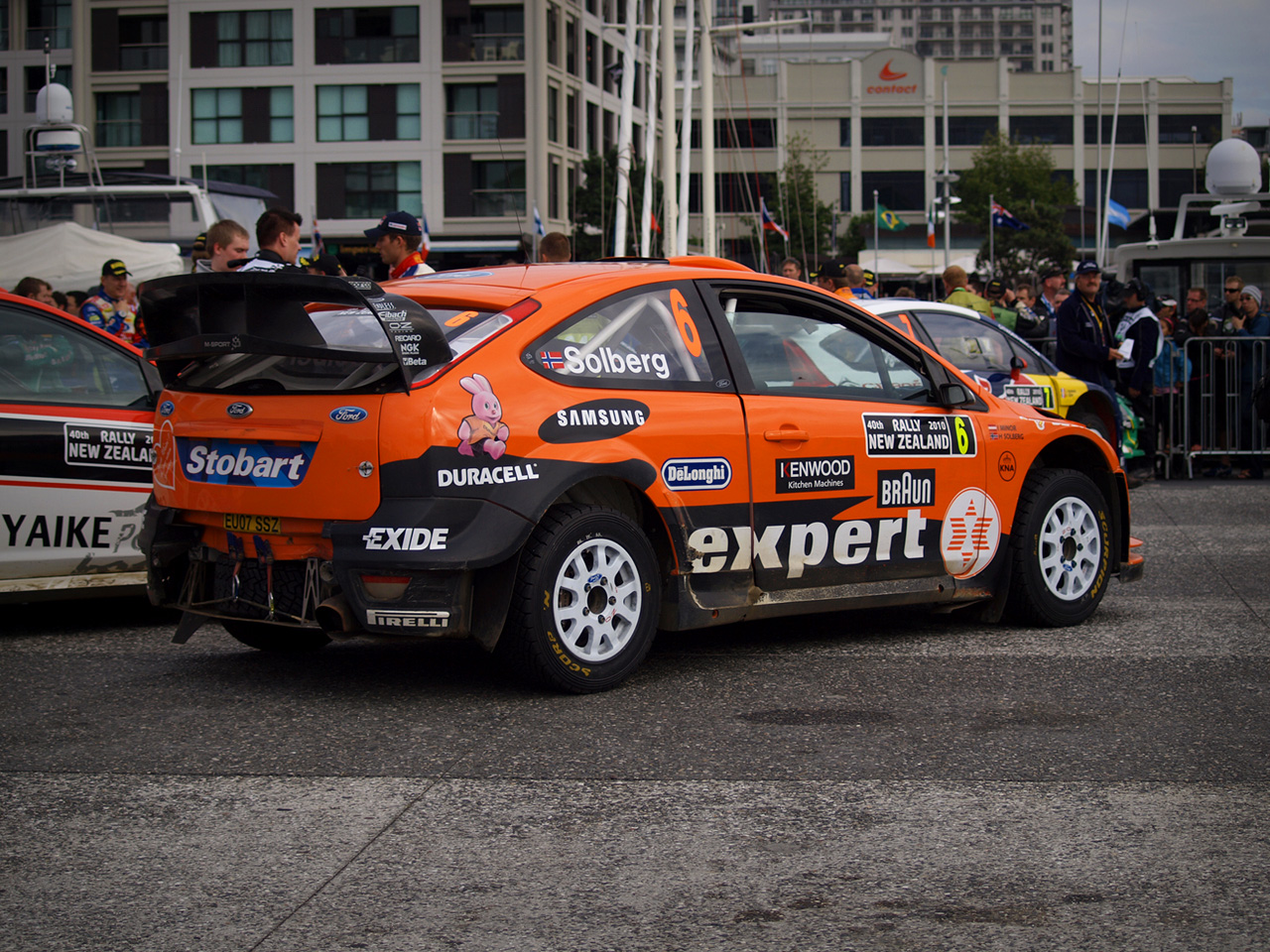
- The Rally New Zealand returned to the championship.
- Host country: New Zealand
- Rally base: Auckland, North Island
- Dates run: 29 September – 2 October 2022
- Start location: Auckland, North Island
- Finish location: Auckland, North Island
- Stages: 17 (279.80 km; 173.86 miles)
- Stage surface: Gravel
- Transport distance: 1,100.17 km (683.61 miles)
- Overall distance: 1,379.97 km (857.47 miles)

Statistics
- Crews registered: 29
- Crews: 28 at start, 21 at finish

Overall results
- Overall winner: (Finland) Kalle Rovanperä (Finland) Jonne Halttunen (Japan) Toyota Gazoo Racing WRT; 2:48:01.4
- Power Stage winner: (Finland) Kalle Rovanperä (Finland) Jonne Halttunen (Japan) Toyota Gazoo Racing WRT; 4:51.9

Support category results
- WRC-2 winner: (New Zealand) Hayden Paddon (New Zealand) John Kennard; 2:58:05.1
- WRC-3 winner: No classified finishers.

The 2022 Rally New Zealand (also known as the Repco Rally New Zealand 2022) was a motor racing event for rally cars that was held over four days between 29 September and 2 October 2022. It would mark the forty-fifth running of the Rally New Zealand. The event was the eleventh round of the 2022 World Rally Championship, World Rally Championship-2 and World Rally Championship-3. The 2022 event was based in Auckland of North Island and was set to be contested over seventeen special stages covering a total competitive distance of 279.80 km (173.86 mi).

Sébastien Loeb and Daniel Elena were the overall reigning rally winners, but they would not defend their titles. Citroën Total World Rally Team, the team they drove for in 2012, when the Rally New Zealand held a World Rally Championship event last time, were the defending manufacturers' winners. However, they would not defend the rally either as they withdrew from the championship at the end of 2019.

Kalle Rovanperä and Jonne Halttunen won their sixth rally of the season and became the 2022 World Champions. Their team, Toyota Gazoo Racing WRT, were the manufacturers' winners. Hayden Paddon and John Kennard won the World Rally Championship-2 category.

== Background ==
=== Entry list ===
The following crews entered into the rally. The event was opened to crews competing in the World Rally Championship, its support categories, the World Rally Championship-2 and World Rally Championship-3, and privateer entries that were not registered to score points in any championship. Eleven were set to enter under Rally1 regulations, as were twelve Rally2 crews in the World Rally Championship-2.

Rally1 entries competing in the World Rally Championship
No.	Driver	Co-Driver	Entrant	Car	Championship eligibility	Tyre
1	(France) Sébastien Ogier	(France) Benjamin Veillas	(Japan) Toyota Gazoo Racing WRT	Toyota GR Yaris Rally1	Driver, Co-driver, Manufacturer	P
2	(Sweden) Oliver Solberg	(United Kingdom) Elliott Edmondson	(South Korea) Hyundai Shell Mobis WRT	Hyundai i20 N Rally1	Driver, Co-driver, Manufacturer	P
8	(Estonia) Ott Tänak	(Estonia) Martin Järveoja	(South Korea) Hyundai Shell Mobis WRT	Hyundai i20 N Rally1	Driver, Co-driver, Manufacturer	P
11	(Belgium) Thierry Neuville	(Belgium) Martijn Wydaeghe	(South Korea) Hyundai Shell Mobis WRT	Hyundai i20 N Rally1	Driver, Co-driver, Manufacturer	P
16	(France) Adrien Fourmaux	(France) Alexandre Coria	(United Kingdom) M-Sport Ford WRT	Ford Puma Rally1	Driver, Co-driver, Manufacturer	—N/a
18	(Japan) Takamoto Katsuta	(Republic of Ireland) Aaron Johnston	(Japan) Toyota Gazoo Racing WRT NG	Toyota GR Yaris Rally1	Driver, Co-driver, Manufacturer/Team	P
33	(United Kingdom) Elfyn Evans	(United Kingdom) Scott Martin	(Japan) Toyota Gazoo Racing WRT	Toyota GR Yaris Rally1	Driver, Co-driver, Manufacturer	P
37	(Italy) Lorenzo Bertelli	(Italy) Lorenzo Granai	(United Kingdom) M-Sport Ford WRT	Ford Puma Rally1	Driver, Co-driver	P
42	(Republic of Ireland) Craig Breen	(Republic of Ireland) Paul Nagle	(United Kingdom) M-Sport Ford WRT	Ford Puma Rally1	Driver, Co-driver, Manufacturer	P
44	(United Kingdom) Gus Greensmith	(Sweden) Jonas Andersson	(United Kingdom) M-Sport Ford WRT	Ford Puma Rally1	Driver, Co-driver, Manufacturer	P
69	(Finland) Kalle Rovanperä	(Finland) Jonne Halttunen	(Japan) Toyota Gazoo Racing WRT	Toyota GR Yaris Rally1	Driver, Co-driver, Manufacturer	P

Rally2 entries competing in the World Rally Championship-2
No.	Driver	Co-Driver	Entrant	Car	Championship eligibility	Tyre
20	(New Zealand) Hayden Paddon	(New Zealand) John Kennard	(New Zealand) Hayden Paddon	Hyundai i20 N Rally2	Driver, Co-driver	P
21	(Poland) Kajetan Kajetanowicz	(Poland) Maciej Szczepaniak	(Poland) Kajetan Kajetanowicz	Škoda Fabia Rally2 evo	Driver, Co-driver	P
22	(New Zealand) Ben Hunt	(New Zealand) Tony Rawstorn	(New Zealand) Ben Hunt	Škoda Fabia Rally2 evo	Driver, Co-driver	P
23	(New Zealand) Shane van Gisbergen	(Australia) Glen Weston	(New Zealand) Shane van Gisbergen	Škoda Fabia R5	Driver, Co-driver	P
24	(Australia) Harry Bates	(Australia) John McCarthy	(Australia) Harry Bates	Škoda Fabia Rally2 evo	Junior Driver, Co-driver	P
25	(New Zealand) Raana Horan	(New Zealand) Michael Connor	(New Zealand) Raana Horan	Škoda Fabia Rally2 evo	Driver, Co-driver	P
26	(New Zealand) Todd Bawden	(New Zealand) Paul Burborough	(New Zealand) Todd Bawden	Ford Fiesta Rally2	Masters Driver, Masters Co-driver	P
27	(New Zealand) Kingsley Jones	(New Zealand) Waverley Jones	(New Zealand) Kingsley Jones	Škoda Fabia R5	Masters Driver, Co-driver	P
28	(Germany) Armin Kremer	(Germany) Ella Kremer	(France) Saintéloc Junior Team	Citroën C3 Rally2	Masters Driver, Co-driver	P
29	(Australia) Luke Anear	(Australia) Andrew Sarandis	(Australia) Luke Anear	Ford Fiesta Rally2	Driver, Co-driver	P
30	(New Zealand) Andy Martin	(New Zealand) Matt Hayward	(New Zealand) Andy Martin	Volkswagen Polo GTI R5	Masters Driver, Co-driver	P
31	(Spain) Miguel Díaz-Aboitiz	(Spain) Jordi Hereu	(Spain) Miguel Díaz-Aboitiz	Škoda Fabia Rally2 evo	Masters Driver, Co-driver	P

=== Itinerary ===
All dates and times are NZST (UTC+12).

Date	Time	No.	Stage name	Distance
29 September	9:01	—	Inland Road [Shakedown]	3.54 km
29 September	18:08	SS1	Pukekawa Auckland Domain	1.78 km
30 September	8:33	SS2	Whaanga Coast 1	29.27 km
30 September	10:11	SS3	Te Akau South 1	31.48 km
30 September	11:14	SS4	Te Akau North 1	18.53 km
30 September	14:22	SS5	Whaanga Coast 2	29.27 km
30 September	16:00	SS6	Te Akau South 2	31.48 km
30 September	17:03	SS7	Te Akau North 2	18.53 km
1 October	8:08	SS8	Kaipara Hills 1	15.83 km
1 October	9:06	SS9	Puhoi 1	22.50 km
1 October	10:14	SS10	Komokoriki 1	5.81 km
1 October	14:08	SS11	Kaipara Hills 2	15.83 km
1 October	15:06	SS12	Puhoi 2	22.50 km
1 October	16:24	SS13	Komokoriki 2	5.81 km
2 October	11:03	SS14	Whitford Forest – Te Maraunga Waiho 1	8.82 km
2 October	12:08	SS15	Jacks Ridge Haunui 1	6.77 km
2 October	13:38	SS16	Whitford Forest – Te Maraunga Waiho 2	8.82 km
2 October	15:18	SS17	Jacks Ridge Haunui 2 [Power Stage]	6.77 km

== Report ==
=== WRC Rally1 ===
==== Classification ====
Position		No.	Driver	Co-driver	Entrant	Car	Time	Difference	Points	
Event	Class	No.	Driver	Co-driver	Entrant	Car	Time	Difference	Event	Stage
1	1	69	Kalle Rovanperä	Jonne Halttunen	Toyota Gazoo Racing WRT	Toyota GR Yaris Rally1	2:48:01.4	0.0	25	5
2	2	1	Sébastien Ogier	Benjamin Veillas	Toyota Gazoo Racing WRT	Toyota GR Yaris Rally1	2:48:36.0	+34.6	18	3
3	3	8	Ott Tänak	Martin Järveoja	Hyundai Shell Mobis WRT	Hyundai i20 N Rally1	2:48:49.9	+48.5	15	4
4	4	11	Thierry Neuville	Martijn Wydaeghe	Hyundai Shell Mobis WRT	Hyundai i20 N Rally1	2:50:00.2	+1:58.8	12	1
5	5	2	Oliver Solberg	Elliott Edmondson	Hyundai Shell Mobis WRT	Hyundai i20 N Rally1	2:51:56.7	+3:55.3	10	2
7	6	37	Lorenzo Bertelli	Lorenzo Granai	M-Sport Ford WRT	Ford Puma Rally1	2:58:40.4	+10:39.0	6	0
16	7	42	Craig Breen	Paul Nagle	M-Sport Ford WRT	Ford Puma Rally1	3:27:00.8	+38:59.4	0	0
Retired SS12		18	Takamoto Katsuta	Aaron Johnston	Toyota Gazoo Racing WRT NG	Toyota GR Yaris Rally1	Accident		0	0
Retired SS11		33	Elfyn Evans	Scott Martin	Toyota Gazoo Racing WRT	Toyota GR Yaris Rally1	Accident damage		0	0
Retired SS10		44	Gus Greensmith	Jonas Andersson	M-Sport Ford WRT	Ford Puma Rally1	Accident		0	0
Did not start		16	Adrien Fourmaux	Alexandre Coria	M-Sport Ford WRT	Ford Puma Rally1	Withdrawn		0	0

==== Special stages ====
Stage	Winners	Car	Time	Class leaders
SD	Rovanperä / Halttunen	Toyota GR Yaris Rally1	1:27.7	—N/a
SS1	Tänak / Järveoja	Hyundai i20 N Rally1	1:45.8	Tänak / Järveoja
SS2	Greensmith / Andersson	Ford Puma Rally1	20:04.4	Breen / Nagle
SS3	Evans / Martin	Toyota GR Yaris Rally1	17:33.0	Breen / Nagle
SS4	Tänak / Järveoja	Hyundai i20 N Rally1	9:52.0	Tänak / Järveoja
SS5	Ogier / Veillas	Toyota GR Yaris Rally1	19:40.2	Ogier / Veillas
SS6	Rovanperä / Halttunen	Toyota GR Yaris Rally1	17:35.8	Ogier / Veillas
SS7	Tänak / Järveoja	Hyundai i20 N Rally1	9:47.5	Tänak / Järveoja
SS8	Breen / Nagle	Ford Puma Rally1	9:42.9	Evans / Martin
SS9	Rovanperä / Halttunen	Toyota GR Yaris Rally1	12:37.7	Rovanperä / Halttunen
SS10	Breen / Nagle	Ford Puma Rally1	3:20.6	Rovanperä / Halttunen
SS11	Rovanperä / Halttunen	Toyota GR Yaris Rally1	12:37.7	Rovanperä / Halttunen
SS12	Rovanperä / Halttunen	Toyota GR Yaris Rally1	12:27.8	Rovanperä / Halttunen
SS13	Breen / Nagle	Ford Puma Rally1	3:19.2	Rovanperä / Halttunen
SS14	Rovanperä / Halttunen	Toyota GR Yaris Rally1	4:55.7	Rovanperä / Halttunen
SS15	Tänak / Järveoja	Hyundai i20 N Rally1	4:52.6	Rovanperä / Halttunen
SS16	Ogier / Veillas	Toyota GR Yaris Rally1	4:52.4	Rovanperä / Halttunen
SS17	Rovanperä / Halttunen	Toyota GR Yaris Rally1	4:51.9	Rovanperä / Halttunen

==== Championship standings ====
- **Bold text** indicates 2022 World Champions.

Pos.	Drivers' championships			Co-drivers' championships			Manufacturers' championships		
Pos.	Move	Driver	Points	Move	Co-driver	Points	Move	Manufacturer	Points
1		**Kalle Rovanperä**	237		**Jonne Halttunen**	237		Toyota Gazoo Racing WRT	455
2		Ott Tänak	173		Martin Järveoja	173		Hyundai Shell Mobis WRT	374
3		Thierry Neuville	144		Martijn Wydaeghe	144		M-Sport Ford WRT	224
4		Elfyn Evans	116		Scott Martin	116		Toyota Gazoo Racing WRT NG	112
5		Takamoto Katsuta	100		Aaron Johnston	100			

=== WRC-2 Rally2 ===
==== Classification ====
Position		No.	Driver	Co-driver	Entrant	Car	Time	Difference	Points		
Event	Class	No.	Driver	Co-driver	Entrant	Car	Time	Difference	Class	Stage	Event
6	1	20	Hayden Paddon	John Kennard	Hayden Paddon	Hyundai i20 N Rally2	2:58:05.1	0.0	25	3	8
8	2	21	Kajetan Kajetanowicz	Maciej Szczepaniak	Kajetan Kajetanowicz	Škoda Fabia Rally2 evo	3:00:38.2	+2:33.1	18	2	4
9	3	23	Shane van Gisbergen	Glen Weston	Shane van Gisbergen	Škoda Fabia R5	3:01:30.2	+3:25.1	15	1	2
10	4	24	Harry Bates	John McCarthy	Harry Bates	Škoda Fabia Rally2 evo	3:04:53.0	+6:47.9	12	0	1
11	5	28	Armin Kremer	Ella Kremer	Saintéloc Junior Team	Citroën C3 Rally2	3:09:03.2	+10:58.1	10	0	0
12	6	26	Todd Bawden	Paul Burborough	Todd Bawden	Ford Fiesta Rally2	3:10:10.7	+12:05.6	8	0	0
13	7	29	Luke Anear	Andrew Sarandis	Luke Anear	Ford Fiesta Rally2	3:12:39.7	+14:34.6	6	0	0
14	8	22	Ben Hunt	Tony Rawstorn	Ben Hunt	Škoda Fabia Rally2 evo	3:14:26.4	+16:21.3	4	0	0
15	9	30	Andy Martin	Matt Hayward	Andy Martin	Volkswagen Polo GTI R5	3:19:28.7	+21:23.6	2	0	0
17	10	31	Miguel Díaz-Aboitiz	Jordi Hereu	Miguel Díaz-Aboitiz	Škoda Fabia Rally2 evo	3:30:16.1	+32:11.0	1	0	0
Retired SS12		27	Kingsley Jones	Waverley Jones	Kingsley Jones	Škoda Fabia R5	Mechanical		0	0	0
Retired SS2		25	Raana Horan	Michael Connor	Raana Horan	Škoda Fabia Rally2 evo	Withdrawn		0	0	0

==== Special stages ====
Stage	Open Championship				Junior Championship				Masters Cup			
Stage	Winners	Car	Time	Class leaders	Winners	Car	Time	Class leaders	Winners	Car	Time	Class leaders
SD	Paddon / Kennard	Hyundai i20 N Rally2	1:35.3	—N/a	Bates / McCarthy	Škoda Fabia Rally2 evo	1:35.3	—N/a	A. Kremer / E. Kremer	Citroën C3 Rally2	1:40.7	—N/a
SS1	Paddon / Kennard	Hyundai i20 N Rally2	1:52.4	Paddon / Kennard	Bates / McCarthy	Škoda Fabia Rally2 evo	1:57.5	Bates / McCarthy	A. Kremer / E. Kremer	Citroën C3 Rally2	1:58.6	A. Kremer / E. Kremer
SS2	Paddon / Kennard	Hyundai i20 N Rally2	20:51.9	Paddon / Kennard	Bates / McCarthy	Škoda Fabia Rally2 evo	21:07.3	Bates / McCarthy	A. Kremer / E. Kremer	Citroën C3 Rally2	22:11.2	A. Kremer / E. Kremer
SS3	Paddon / Kennard	Hyundai i20 N Rally2	18:32.5	Paddon / Kennard	Bates / McCarthy	Škoda Fabia Rally2 evo	19:02.5	Bates / McCarthy	A. Kremer / E. Kremer	Citroën C3 Rally2	19:55.9	A. Kremer / E. Kremer
SS4	Kajetanowicz / Szczepaniak	Škoda Fabia Rally2 evo	10:34.6	Paddon / Kennard	Bates / McCarthy	Škoda Fabia Rally2 evo	10:44.1	Bates / McCarthy	A. Kremer / E. Kremer	Citroën C3 Rally2	11:18.6	A. Kremer / E. Kremer
SS5	Paddon / Kennard	Hyundai i20 N Rally2	20:40.3	Paddon / Kennard	Bates / McCarthy	Škoda Fabia Rally2 evo	21:21.5	Bates / McCarthy	A. Kremer / E. Kremer	Citroën C3 Rally2	21:34.9	A. Kremer / E. Kremer
SS6	Paddon / Kennard	Hyundai i20 N Rally2	9:47.5	Paddon / Kennard	Bates / McCarthy	Škoda Fabia Rally2 evo	21:20.0	Bates / McCarthy	K. Jones / W. Jones	Škoda Fabia R5	19:55.3	A. Kremer / E. Kremer
SS7	Kajetanowicz / Szczepaniak	Škoda Fabia Rally2 evo	10:26.7	Paddon / Kennard	Bates / McCarthy	Škoda Fabia Rally2 evo	10:53.3	Bates / McCarthy	K. Jones / W. Jones	Škoda Fabia R5	11:14.2	A. Kremer / E. Kremer
SS8	Paddon / Kennard	Hyundai i20 N Rally2	10:27.8	Paddon / Kennard	Bates / McCarthy	Škoda Fabia Rally2 evo	10:47.5	Bates / McCarthy	Bawden / Burborough	Ford Fiesta Rally2	11:02.1	A. Kremer / E. Kremer
SS9	Paddon / Kennard	Hyundai i20 N Rally2	13:26.9	Paddon / Kennard	Bates / McCarthy	Škoda Fabia Rally2 evo	13:56.3	Bates / McCarthy	Bawden / Burborough	Ford Fiesta Rally2	14:11.7	A. Kremer / E. Kremer
SS10	Stage interrupted											
SS11	Bates / McCarthy	Škoda Fabia Rally2 evo	10:41.1	Paddon / Kennard	Bates / McCarthy	Škoda Fabia Rally2 evo	10:41.1	Bates / McCarthy	Bawden / Burborough	Ford Fiesta Rally2	11:14.3	A. Kremer / E. Kremer
SS12	Paddon / Kennard	Hyundai i20 N Rally2	13:27.6	Paddon / Kennard	Bates / McCarthy	Škoda Fabia Rally2 evo	14:39.7	Bates / McCarthy	A. Kremer / E. Kremer	Citroën C3 Rally2	14:11.9	A. Kremer / E. Kremer
SS13	Paddon / Kennard	Hyundai i20 N Rally2	3:39.6	Paddon / Kennard	Bates / McCarthy	Škoda Fabia Rally2 evo	3:42.7	Bates / McCarthy	Bawden / Burborough	Ford Fiesta Rally2	3:50.9	A. Kremer / E. Kremer
SS14	Paddon / Kennard	Hyundai i20 N Rally2	5:16.0	Paddon / Kennard	Bates / McCarthy	Škoda Fabia Rally2 evo	5:17.2	Bates / McCarthy	A. Kremer / E. Kremer	Citroën C3 Rally2	5:31.9	A. Kremer / E. Kremer
SS15	Paddon / Kennard	Hyundai i20 N Rally2	5:07.4	Paddon / Kennard	Bates / McCarthy	Škoda Fabia Rally2 evo	5:15.8	Bates / McCarthy	Bawden / Burborough	Ford Fiesta Rally2	5:27.7	A. Kremer / E. Kremer
SS16	Bates / McCarthy	Škoda Fabia Rally2 evo	5:16.5	Paddon / Kennard	Bates / McCarthy	Škoda Fabia Rally2 evo	5:16.5	Bates / McCarthy	A. Kremer / E. Kremer	Citroën C3 Rally2	5:30.7	A. Kremer / E. Kremer
SS17	Paddon / Kennard	Hyundai i20 N Rally2	5:07.8	Paddon / Kennard	Bates / McCarthy	Škoda Fabia Rally2 evo	5:13.5	Bates / McCarthy	A. Kremer / E. Kremer	Citroën C3 Rally2	5:26.0	A. Kremer / E. Kremer

==== Championship standings ====
- **Bold text** indicates 2022 World Champions.

Pos.	Open Drivers' championships			Open Co-drivers' championships			Teams' championships			Junior Drivers' championships			Junior Co-drivers' championships			Driver Masters' championships			Co-driver Masters' championships		
Pos.	Move	Driver	Points	Move	Co-driver	Points	Move	Manufacturer	Points	Move	Manufacturer	Points	Move	Driver	Points	Move	Driver	Points	Move	Driver	Points
1		Andreas Mikkelsen	109		Torstein Eriksen	109		Toksport WRT	155		Emil Lindholm	108		**James Fulton**	111	2	Armin Kremer	100		Laurent Magat	100
2	2	Kajetan Kajetanowicz	96	1	Maciej Szczepaniak	96		Hyundai Motorsport N	143		Chris Ingram	92		Louis Louka	61	1	Mauro Miele	86		Michael Joseph Morrissey	61
3	1	Emil Lindholm	89	1	Reeta Hämäläinen	89		Toksport WRT 2	101		Nikolay Gryazin	79		Samu Vaaleri	50	1	Freddy Loix	83		Michela Lorigiola	48
4	1	Yohan Rossel	80		Konstantin Aleksandrov	70		Yaco ACCR Team	50		Georg Linnamäe	59		Elia De Guio	25		Jean-Michel Raoux	70		Hans van Goor	43
5		Nikolay Gryazin	70		Valentin Sarreaud	69		Saintéloc Junior Team	40		Mikołaj Marczyk	59				2	Miguel Díaz-Aboitiz	50		Jörgen Fornander	25

=== WRC-3 Rally3 ===
No Rally3 crews entered the round.

==== Championship standings ====
Pos.	Open Drivers' championships			Open Co-drivers' championships		
Pos.	Move	Driver	Points	Move	Co-driver	Points
1		Sami Pajari	87		Enni Mälkönen	87
2		Jan Černý	86		Liam Regan	63
3		Lauri Joona	86		Mikael Korhonen	61
4		William Creighton	63		Tamás Kürti	61
5		Zoltán László	61		Manuel Fenoli	48

Previous rally: 2022 Acropolis Rally	2022 FIA World Rally Championship	Next rally: 2022 Rally Catalunya
Previous rally: 2018 Rally New Zealand; 2020 edition cancelled	2022 Rally New Zealand	Next rally: TBD
