= Armin Kremer =

German rally driver (born 1968)

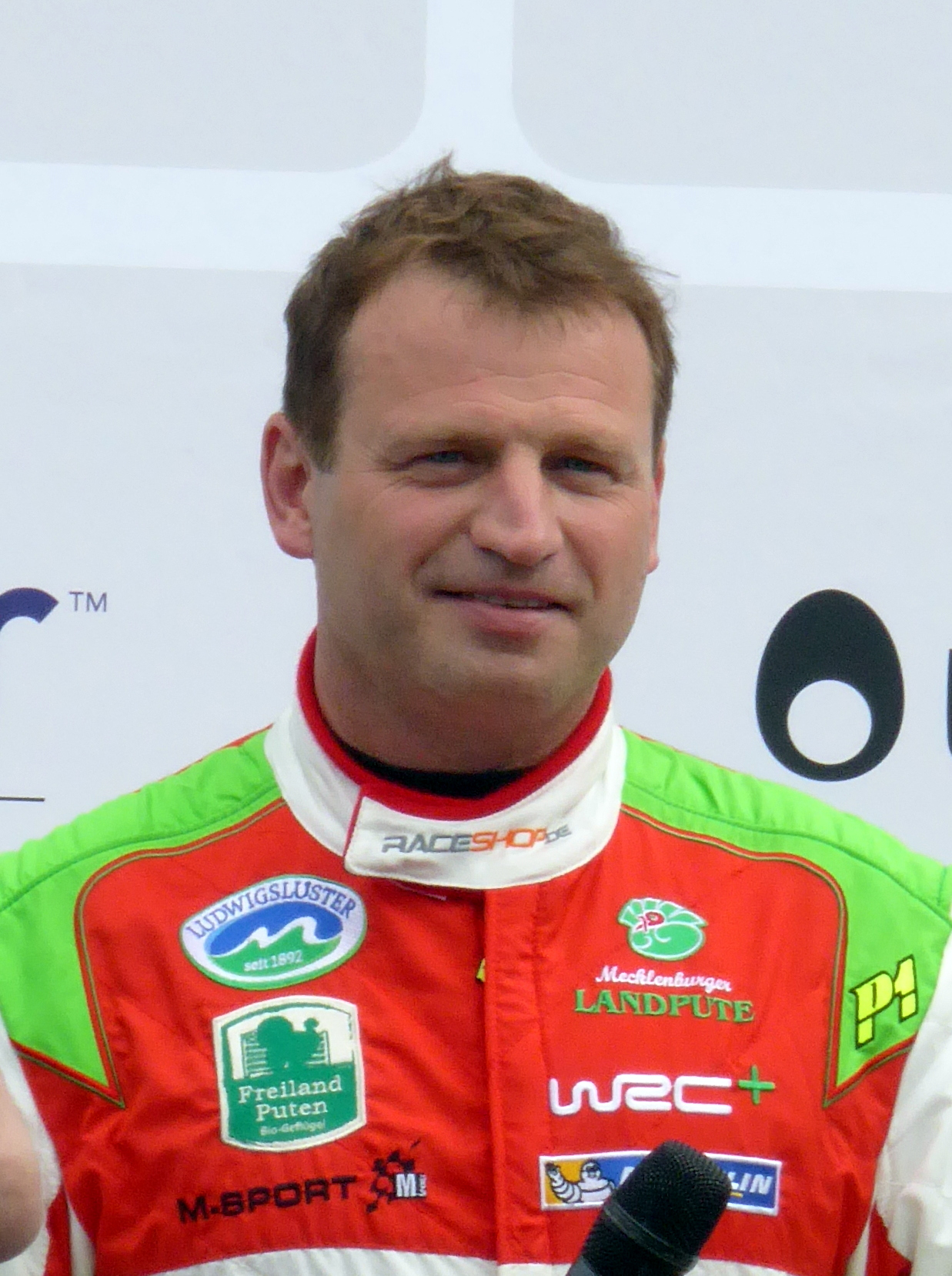
- Kremer in 2017.

Personal information
- Nationality: (Germany) German
- Born: 4 December 1968 (age 57); Crivitz, East Germany

World Rally Championship record
- Years active: 1995, 1997–1999, 2002, 2004, 2011 – 2018, 2020–present
- Co-driver: (Germany) Sven Behling (Germany) Klaus Wicha (Germany) Fred Berssen (Germany) Dieter Schneppenheim (Germany) Timo Gottschalk (Austria) Daniela Ertl (Germany) Pirmin Winklhofer (Germany) Ella Kremer
- Teams: Privateer, Stohl Racing
- Rallies: 53
- Championships: 0
- Rally wins: 0
- Podiums: 0
- Stage wins: 0
- Total points: 4
- First rally: 1995 Rally de Portugal
- Last rally: 2023 Central European Rally

Armin Kremer (born 4 December 1968, Crivitz, East Germany) is a German rally driver who is currently competing in the World Rally Championship in the WRC-2 class. He began rallying in the WRC at the 1995 Rally de Portugal and has entered various rallies since. He won the European Rally Championship in 2001 driving a Toyota Corolla WRC and the Asia-Pacific Rally Championship in 2003 in a Mitsubishi Lancer Evo VII.

In 2017, at the age of 48, Kremer was the oldest driver to compete in a 2017 World Rally Car at Rallye Deutschland.

== Career results ==
=== WRC results ===
Year	Entrant	Car	1	2	3	4	5	6	7	8	9	10	11	12	13	14	15	16	Pos.	Pts
1995	Armin Kremer	Ford Escort RS Cosworth	MON	SWE	POR; 23	FRA	NZL	AUS	ESP	GBR									NC	0
1997	Armin Kremer	Mitsubishi Lancer Evo III	MON; 10	SWE	KEN	POR	ESP	FRA	ARG	GRE	NZL	FIN	IDN	ITA	AUS	GBR			NC	0
1998	Armin Kremer	Subaru Impreza WRC 97	MON; 8	SWE	KEN	POR	ESP	FRA	ARG	GRE	NZL	FIN	ITA	AUS	GBR				NC	0
1999	Armin Kremer	Mitsubishi Carisma GT Evo V	MON	SWE	KEN	POR	ESP	FRA	ARG	GRE; Ret	NZL	FIN	CHN	ITA	AUS				NC	0
1999	Armin Kremer	Subaru Impreza WRC 97														GBR; 14			NC	0
2002	Armin Kremer	Ford Focus RS WRC 01	MON; 15	SWE	FRA	ESP; 15	CYP	ARG	GRE; Ret	KEN	FIN; Ret	GER; Ret	ITA	NZL	AUS	GBR; 14			NC	0
2004	Armin Kremer	Toyota Corolla WRC	MON	SWE	MEX	NZL	CYP	GRE	TUR	ARG	FIN	GER; Ret	JPN	GBR	ITA	FRA	ESP	AUS	NC	0
2011	Armin Kremer	Mitsubishi Lancer Evo X	SWE	MEX	POR	JOR	ITA	ARG; Ret	GRE	FIN	GER	AUS	FRA	ESP	GBR				NC	0
2012	Armin Kremer	Subaru Impreza STi	MON	SWE	MEX	POR	ARG; 21	GRE	NZL	FIN	GER	GBR	FRA	ITA	ESP				NC	0
2013	Stohl Racing	Subaru Impreza STi	MON; 11	SWE	MEX; 17	POR	ARG; Ret	GRE	ITA; 15	FIN									NC	0
2013	Stohl Racing	Ford Fiesta RRC									GER; Ret	AUS	FRA	ESP	GBR				NC	0
2014	Stohl Racing	Ford Fiesta R5	MON; 17	SWE	MEX	POR	ARG	ITA	POL	FIN									NC	0
2014	Armin Kremer	Škoda Fabia S2000									GER; 13	AUS	FRA	ESP	GBR				NC	0
2015	BRR Baumschlager Rallye & Racing Team	Škoda Fabia S2000	MON; 14	SWE	MEX	ARG													NC	0
2015	BRR Baumschlager Rallye & Racing Team	Škoda Fabia R5					POR; 21	ITA; 13	POL; 18	FIN	GER; Ret	AUS	FRA; Ret	ESP; 13	GBR				NC	0
2016	BRR Baumschlager Rally & Rally Team	Škoda Fabia R5	MON; 10	SWE	MEX; 19	ARG	POR	ITA; 12	POL; Ret	FIN	GER; 10	CHN; C	FRA	ESP; Ret	GBR	AUS			23rd	2
2017	BRR Baumschlager Rally & Rally Team	Škoda Fabia R5	MON; Ret	SWE	MEX	FRA	ARG	POR	ITA	POL	FIN		ESP	GBR	AUS				22nd	2
2017	M-Sport	Ford Fiesta WRC										GER; 9							22nd	2
2018	Motorsport Italia	Škoda Fabia R5	MON	SWE	MEX	FRA	ARG	POR	ITA	FIN	GER	TUR	GBR	ESP	AUS; Ret				NC	0
2020	Armin Kremer	Volkswagen Polo GTI R5	MON	SWE	MEX	EST	TUR	ITA; 19	MNZ										NC	0
2021	Armin Kremer	Volkswagen Polo GTI R5	MON	ARC	CRO	POR	ITA; 15	KEN	EST	BEL	GRE	FIN							NC	0
2021	Armin Kremer	Citroën C3 R5											ESP; 22	MNZ					NC	0
2022	Armin Kremer	Škoda Fabia Rally2 evo	MON	SWE	CRO; 20	POR; Ret	ITA; Ret	KEN	EST	FIN	BEL; 16	GRE; 18		ESP; 26	JPN				NC	0
2022	Saintéloc Junior Team	Citroën C3 Rally2											NZL; 12						NC	0
2023	Armin Kremer	Škoda Fabia Rally2 evo	MON	SWE	MEX	CRO; 15	POR; Ret	ITA; Ret	KEN; 13										NC	0
2023	Armin Kremer	Škoda Fabia RS Rally2								EST; 43	FIN	GRE	CHL	EUR; 20	JPN				NC	0

==== PWRC results ====
Year	Entrant	Car	1	2	3	4	5	6	7	8	9	10	11	12	13	14	Pos.	Pts
1997	Armin Kremer	Mitsubishi Lancer Evo III	MON; 2	SWE	KEN	POR	ESP	FRA	ARG	GRE	NZL	FIN	IDN	ITA	AUS	GBR	13th	8

==== WRC-2 results ====
Year	Entrant	Car	1	2	3	4	5	6	7	8	9	10	11	12	13	14	Pos.	Pts
2013	Stohl Racing	Subaru Impreza STi	MON; 2	SWE	MEX; 4	POR	ARG; Ret	GRE	ITA; 5	FIN							12th	40
2013	Stohl Racing	Ford Fiesta RRC									GER; Ret	AUS	FRA	ESP	GBR		12th	40
2014	Stohl Racing	Ford Fiesta R5	MON; 4	SWE	MEX	POR	ARG	ITA	POL	FIN							17th	27
2014	Armin Kremer	Škoda Fabia S2000									GER; 3	AUS	FRA	ESP	GBR		17th	27
2015	BRR Baumschlager Rallye & Racing Team	Škoda Fabia S2000	MON; 3	SWE	MEX	ARG											11th	46
2015	BRR Baumschlager Rallye & Racing Team	Škoda Fabia R5					POR; 10	ITA; 6	POL; 5	FIN	GER; Ret	AUS	FRA; Ret	ESP; 4	GBR		11th	46
2016	BRR Baumschlager Rallye & Racing Team	Škoda Fabia R5	MON; 2	SWE	MEX; 5	ARG	POR	ITA; 4	POL; Ret	FIN	GER; 3	CHN; C	FRA	ESP; Ret	GBR	AUS	7th	55
2017	BRR Baumschlager Rallye & Racing Team	Škoda Fabia R5	MON; Ret	SWE	MEX	FRA	ARG	POR	ITA	POL	FIN	GER	ESP	GBR	AUS		NC	0
2018	Motorsport Italia	Škoda Fabia R5	MON	SWE	MEX	FRA	ARG	POR	ITA	FIN	GER	TUR	GBR	ESP	AUS; Ret		NC	0
2022	Armin Kremer	Škoda Fabia Rally2 evo	MON	SWE	CRO; 12	POR; Ret	ITA; Ret	KEN	EST	FIN	BEL; 8	GRE; 11		ESP; 16	JPN		26th	14
2022	Saintéloc Junior Team	Citroën C3 Rally2											NZL; 5				26th	14

* Season still in progress.

==== WRC-3 results ====
Year	Entrant	Car	1	2	3	4	5	6	7	8	9	10	11	12	Pos.	Pts
2021	Armin Kremer	Volkswagen Polo GTI R5	MON	ARC	CRO	POR	ITA; 7	KEN	EST	BEL	GRE	FIN			23rd	17
2021	Armin Kremer	Citroën C3 R5											ESP; 5	MNZ	23rd	17

Sporting positions
Preceded by Henrik Lundgaard	European Rally Champion; 2001	Succeeded by Renato Travaglia
Preceded by Karamjit Singh	Asia-Pacific Rally Champion; 2003	Succeeded by Karamjit Singh
