= 2019 Asia-Pacific Rally Championship =

The 2019 Asia-Pacific Rally Championship was an international rally championship sanctioned by the FIA. It was the 32nd championship and underwent a major format change. For the first time the two Cups, the Asian Cup and the Pacific Cup, acted as qualifying events for a "Grand Final" at the China Rally Longyou where the highest qualified winner becomes the Asia-Pacific champion.

The championship was contested by a combination of regulations with Group R competing directly against Super 2000 cars.

The Pacific Cup began in New Zealand on 12 April and finished in Australia on 25 August after four rallies. The Asia Cup began in Japan on 6 June and finished on 27 October in China.

New Zealanders won both Cups, Hyundai driver Hayden Paddon won the Pacific Cup while Toyota driver Mike Young won the Asia Cup. Young raced for the Asia-Pacific title and Paddon did not. A mechanical problem delayed Young on the first day of the deciding rally. Taiwanese Subaru driver Dewei Lin won the rally and the championship ahead of another New Zealander, Mazda driver Andrew Hawkeswood and Japanese Citroën driver, Suguru Kawana.

== Event calendar and results ==
=== Pacific Cup ===
The 2019 APRC Pacific Cup was as follows:

Round	Rally name	Podium finishers				Statistics			
Round	Rally name	Rank	Driver	Car	Time	Stages	Length	Starters	Finishers
1	(New Zealand) Rally of Otago (12–14 April)	1	(New Zealand) Hayden Paddon	Hyundai i20 AP4	2:25:54.3	15	272.53 km	127	75
1	(New Zealand) Rally of Otago (12–14 April)	2	(New Zealand) Ben Hunt	Subaru WRX STI	2:33:11.2	15	272.53 km	127	75
1	(New Zealand) Rally of Otago (12–14 April)	3	(New Zealand) Dylan Turner	Audi S1 AP4	2:34:19.3	15	272.53 km	127	75
2	(New Zealand) ENEOS International Rally of Whangarei (3–5 May)	1	(New Zealand) Hayden Paddon	Hyundai i20 AP4	2:39:48.5	18	264.30 km	68	29
2	(New Zealand) ENEOS International Rally of Whangarei (3–5 May)	2	(New Zealand) Ben Hunt	Subaru WRX STI	2:44:45.2	18	264.30 km	68	29
2	(New Zealand) ENEOS International Rally of Whangarei (3–5 May)	3	(New Zealand) David Holder	Holden Barina AP4	2:45:09.3	18	264.30 km	68	29
3	(Australia) Subaru Rally Tasmania (21–23 June)	1	(Australia) Harry Bates	Toyota Yaris AP4	2:09:42.9	17	222.10 km	29	7
3	(Australia) Subaru Rally Tasmania (21–23 June)	2	(Australia) Molly Taylor	Subaru WRX STI	2:12:30.6	17	222.10 km	29	7
3	(Australia) Subaru Rally Tasmania (21–23 June)	3	(Australia) Lewis Bates	Toyota Yaris AP4	2:13:15.3	17	222.10 km	29	7
4	(Australia) Pedders Eureka Rush (24–25 August)	1	(Australia) Harry Bates	Toyota Yaris AP4	1:11:32.1	10	120.36 km	37	26
4	(Australia) Pedders Eureka Rush (24–25 August)	2	(Australia) Lewis Bates	Toyota Yaris AP4	1:14:23.7	10	120.36 km	37	26
4	(Australia) Pedders Eureka Rush (24–25 August)	3	(Australia) Arron Windus	Subaru Impreza	1:15:12.6	10	120.36 km	37	26

=== Asia Cup ===
The 2019 APRC Asia Cup was as follows:

Round	Rally name	Podium finishers				Statistics			
Round	Rally name	Rank	Driver	Car	Time	Stages	Length	Starters	Finishers
1	(Japan) Montre (6–9 June)	1	(Japan) Shigeyuki Konishi	Subaru Impreza WRX STi	1:21:15.8	18	102.02 km	9	7
1	(Japan) Montre (6–9 June)	2	(Japan) Suguru Kawana	Citroën DS3 R3T	1:23:25.5	18	102.02 km	9	7
1	(Japan) Montre (6–9 June)	3	(Japan) Atsushi Masumura	Mitsubishi Lancer Evolution X	1:23:47.5	18	102.02 km	9	7
2	Rally of Indonesia (26–28 July)	1	(Indonesia) H. Rihan Variza	Mazda 2 AP4	2:06:39.0	10	169.53 km	61	
2	Rally of Indonesia (26–28 July)	2	(Indonesia) Priamanaya Djan	Mitsubishi Lancer Evolution X	2:19:38.2	10	169.53 km	61	
2	Rally of Indonesia (26–28 July)	3	(Indonesia) Aldrian Suwardi	Mitsubishi Lancer Evolution IX	4:19:45.2	10	169.53 km	61	
3	(Japan) Rally Hokkaido (14–16 September)	1	(New Zealand) Mike Young	Toyota C-HR	2:04:11.2	16	202.36 km	20	16
3	(Japan) Rally Hokkaido (14–16 September)	2	(Japan) Atsushi Masumura	Mitsubishi Lancer Evolution X	2:11:29.4	16	202.36 km	20	16
3	(Japan) Rally Hokkaido (14–16 September)	3	(Japan) Eiichi Iwashita	Mitsubishi Lancer Evolution IX	2:12:05.8	16	202.36 km	20	16
4	China Rally Longyou (26-27 October)	1	(Taiwan) Dewei Lin	Subaru XV	2:14:44.0	13	220.82 km		
4	China Rally Longyou (26-27 October)	2	(New Zealand) Andrew Hawkeswood	Mazda 2	2:20:29.5	13	220.82 km		
4	China Rally Longyou (26-27 October)	3	(Japan) Suguru Kawana	Citroën DS3 R3T	2:21:02.5	13	220.82 km		

== Championship standings ==
=== Pacific Cup ===
The 2019 APRC Pacific Cup for Drivers points was as follows:

Pos.	Driver	Vehicle	(New Zealand) OTA	(New Zealand) WHA	(Australia) TAS	(Australia) EUR	Total
1	(New Zealand) Hayden Paddon	Hyundai i20 R5	1 ^{14}	1 ^{14}		3 ^{7}	100
2	(Australia) Harry Bates	Toyota Yaris AP4			1 ^{14}	1 ^{13}	77
3	(Australia) Lewis Bates	Toyota Yaris AP4			3 ^{11}	2 ^{11}	55
3	(New Zealand) Andrew Hawkeswood	Mazda 2 AP4	2 ^{12}	3 ^{10}			55
5	(Australia) Molly Taylor	Subaru WRX STI			2 ^{11}	4 ^{4}	45
6	(New Zealand) Jack Hawkeswood	Mazda 2 AP4	3 ^{10}	5 ^{7}			42
7	(New Zealand) David Holder	Holden Barina AP4	Ret	2 ^{12}			30
8	(Australia) Marcus Walkem	Hyundai i20 R5			4 ^{8}	9	20
9	(New Zealand) Michael Young	Toyota Yaris AP4		4 ^{7}			19
10	(Japan) Suguru Kawana	Toyota Vitz		6 ^{4}			12

Key
Colour	Result
Gold	Winner
Silver	2nd place
Bronze	3rd place
Green	Points finish
Blue	Non-points finish
Blue	Non-classified finish (NC)
Purple	Did not finish (Ret)
Black	Excluded (EX)
Black	Disqualified (DSQ)
White	Did not start (DNS)
White	Cancelled (C)
Blank	Withdrew entry from the event (WD)

=== Asia Cup ===
The 2019 APRC Asia Cup for Drivers points was as follows:

Pos.	Driver	Vehicle	(Japan) MON	(Indonesia) IND	(Japan) HOK	(China) LON	Total
1	(New Zealand) Michael Young	Toyota Yaris AP4; Toyota C-HR	4 ^{11}		1 ^{14}	3 ^{7}	87
2	(Japan) Suguru Kawana	Citroën DS3 R3T	1 ^{13}			2 ^{10}	66
3	(Japan) Atsushi Masumura	Mitsubishi Lancer Evolution X	2 ^{11}		2 ^{12}		59
4	(Taiwan) Dewei Lin	Subaru XV			8 ^{3}	1 ^{13}	45
5	(Indonesia) H. Rihan Variza	Mazda 2 AP4		1 ^{13}			38
6	(Japan) Yuki Kohama	Toyota GT86; Toyota Yaris AP4	4 ^{9}		6 ^{4}	Ret	33
7	(Indonesia) Priamanaya Djan	Mitsubishi Lancer Evolution X		2 ^{11}			29
8	(Japan) Fuyuhiko Takahashi	Subaru Impreza WRX STi			3 ^{10}		25
9	(Japan) Mitsuhiro Aoki	Mitsubishi Lancer Evolution X	Ret		4 ^{8}		30
10	(Indonesia) Aldrian Suwardi	Mitsubishi Lancer Evolution IX		3 ^{4}			19
10	(Italy) Fabio Frisiero	Peugeot 208 AP4		4 ^{7}			19
12	(Japan) Nao Otake	Toyota Vitz III RS	Ret		5 ^{4}	Ret	14
13	(Japan) Tomohide Hasegawa	Mitsubishi Lancer Evolution X			6 ^{1}		7

Key
Colour	Result
Gold	Winner
Silver	2nd place
Bronze	3rd place
Green	Points finish
Blue	Non-points finish
Blue	Non-classified finish (NC)
Purple	Did not finish (Ret)
Black	Excluded (EX)
Black	Disqualified (DSQ)
White	Did not start (DNS)
White	Cancelled (C)
Blank	Withdrew entry from the event (WD)
