= Harry Bates (rally driver) =

Australian rally driver

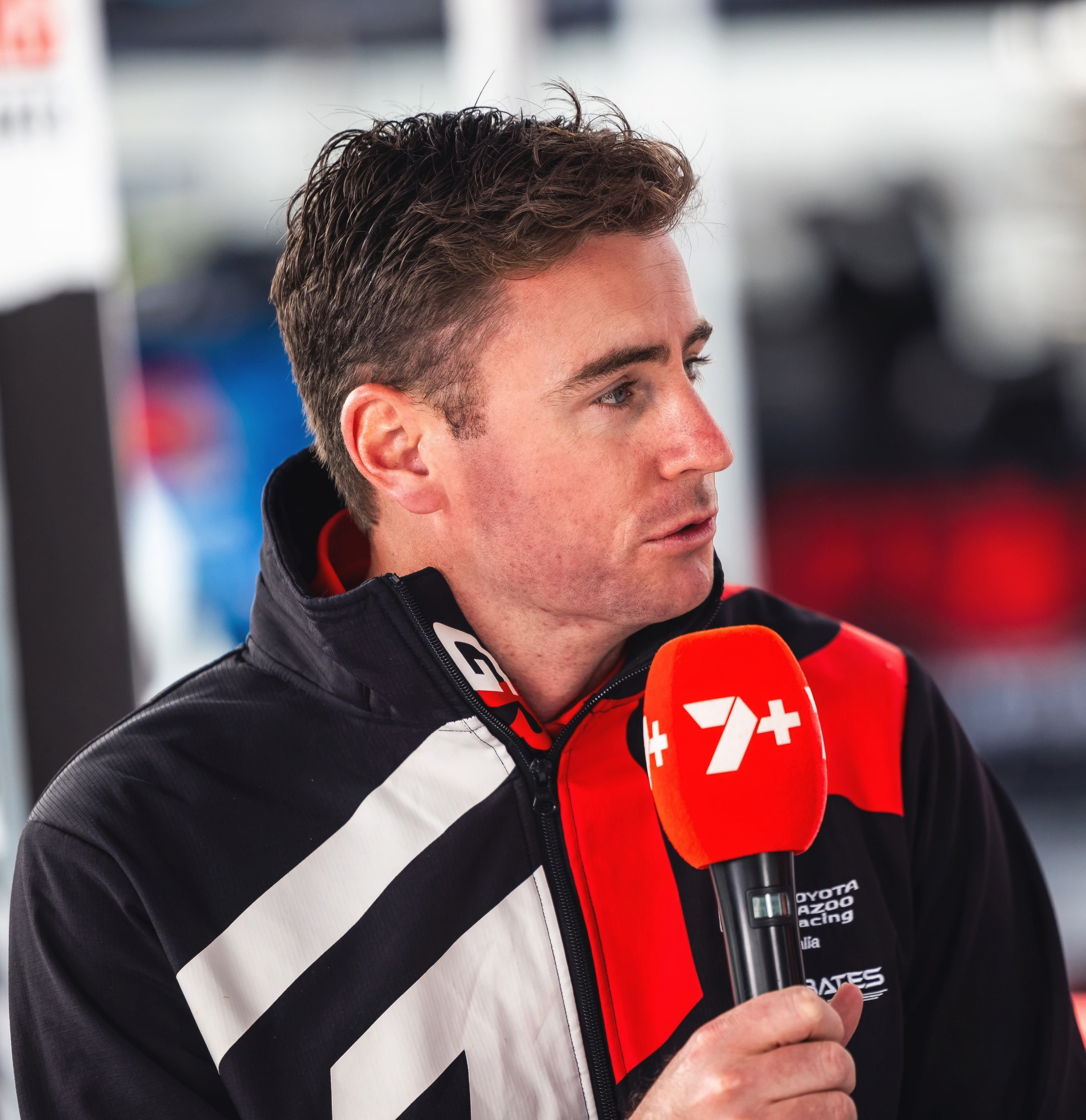
- Bates in 2024
- Nationality: (Australia) Australian
- Born: Harry Richard Bates; 8 March 1995 (age 31)
- Relatives: Neal Bates (father); Lewis Bates (brother); Rick Bates (uncle); Zach Bates (cousin)

Australian Rally Championship
- Years active: 2015–2026
- Teams: Toyota Gazoo Racing Australia / Neal Bates Motorsport
- Starts: 46
- Wins: 25
- Best finish: 1st in 2019, 2021, 2023, 2024

Championship titles
- 2024 2023 2021 2019: Australian Rally Championship; Australian Rally Championship; Australian Rally Championship; Australian Rally Championship

Awards
- 2019: Peter Brock Medal

Harry Richard Bates (born 8 March 1995, Canberra, Australia) is a professional rally driver. He drives for the Toyota Gazoo Racing Australia team. He is a four-time Australian Rally Championship series winner, in 2019, 2021, 2023, and 2024.

Bates' father Neal was also an ARC-winning driver in the 1990s and 2000s, and his brother Lewis won the title in 2022.

Bates' came to prominence in 2015 when he achieved a podium finish on his Australian Rally Championship debut at the 2015 National Capital Rally, in his hometown of Canberra. He went on to achieve a series of youngest-ever records in the ARC including youngest heat winner, youngest event winner and youngest championship winner. In 2026, Bates broke the all-time record for number of ARC heat wins, claiming his 46th heat win at the 2026 Toyota Gazoo Racing Narooma Forest Rally.

For most of his rally career, Bates' co-driver was John McCarthy. From 2023, his co-driver has been Coral Taylor, who also co-drove for Neal for their Australian Rally Championship wins.

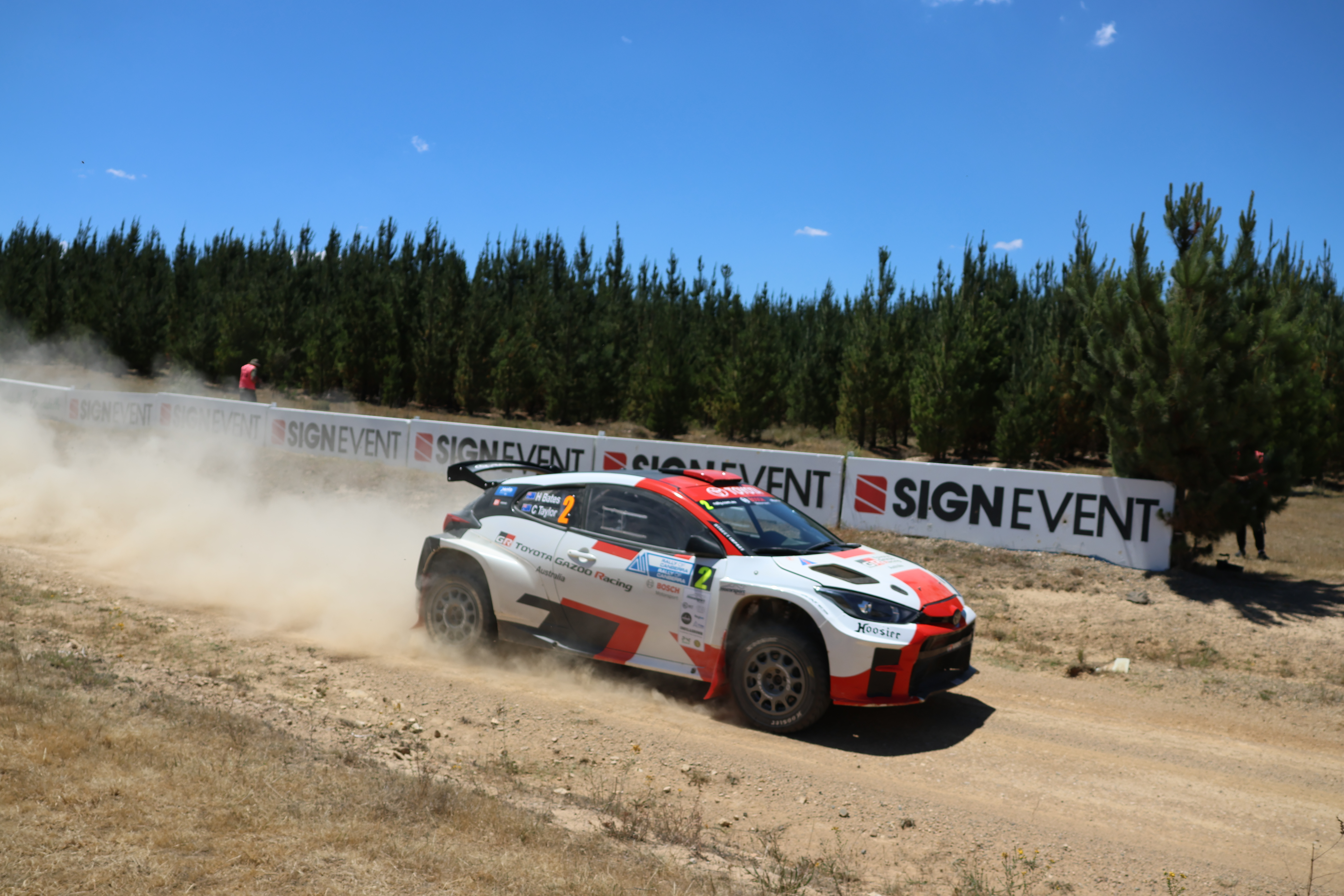
Harry Bates and Co-Driver Coral Taylor in the Toyota Gazoo Racing Yaris at the 2023 Rally of Canberra

== Motorsports career results ==
=== Rally ===
| Season | Series | Position | Car | Team |
|---|---|---|---|---|
| 2015 | Australian 4WD Championship | 11th | Neal Bates Motorsport | Toyota Corolla TRD S2000 |
| 2016 | Australian Rally Championship | 3rd | Toyota Gazoo Racing Australia | Toyota Corolla TRD S2000 |
| 2017 | Australian Rally Championship | 2nd | Toyota Gazoo Racing Australia | Toyota Corolla TRD S2000; Toyota Yaris AP4 |
| 2018 | Australian Rally Championship | 2nd | Toyota Gazoo Racing Australia | Toyota Yaris AP4 |
| 2018 | Asia-Pacific Rally Championship | 17th | Toyota Gazoo Racing Australia | Toyota Yaris AP4 |
| 2019 | Australian Rally Championship | 1st | Toyota Gazoo Racing Australia | Toyota Yaris AP4 |
| 2019 | Asia-Pacific Rally Championship | 2nd | Toyota Gazoo Racing Australia | Toyota Yaris AP4 |
| 2021 | Australian Rally Championship | 1st | Toyota Gazoo Racing Australia | Toyota GR Yaris AP4 |
| 2022 | Australian Rally Championship | 2nd | Toyota Gazoo Racing Australia | Toyota GR Yaris AP4 |
| 2022 | World Rally Championship | 35th | Harry Bates | Škoda Fabia R5/Rally2 evo |
| 2022 | WRC2 Junior Championship | 15th | Harry Bates | Škoda Fabia R5/Rally2 evo |
| 2022 | World Rally Championship-2 | 29th | Harry Bates | Škoda Fabia R5/Rally2 evo |
| 2023 | Australian Rally Championship | 1st | Toyota Gazoo Racing Australia | Toyota GR Yaris AP4 |
| 2024 | Australian Rally Championship | 1st | Toyota Gazoo Racing Australia | Toyota GR Yaris AP4 |
| 2024 | Japanese Rally Championship | 8th | Toyota Gazoo Racing Japan | Toyota GR Yaris Rally2 |
| 2025 | Australian Rally Championship | 3rd | Toyota Gazoo Racing Australia | Toyota GR Yaris Rally2 |

==== Asia-Pacific Rally Championship results ====
| Year | Series | Car | 1 | 2 | 3 | 4 | 5 | Pos. | Pts |
|---|---|---|---|---|---|---|---|---|---|
| 2018 | Asia/Pacific | Toyota Yaris AP4 | NZL | AUS; 5 | MAL | JPN | CHN | 17th | 19 |
| 2019 | Pacific Cup | Toyota Yaris AP4 | OTA | WHA | TAS; 1 | EUR; 1 | | 2nd | 77 |

==== World Rally Championship results ====
| Year | Car | 1 | 2 | 3 | 4 | 5 | 6 | 7 | 8 | 9 | 10 | 11 | 12 | 13 | Pos. | Pts |
|---|---|---|---|---|---|---|---|---|---|---|---|---|---|---|---|---|
| 2022 | Škoda Fabia R5/Rally2 evo | MON | SWE | CRO | POR | ITA | KEN | EST | FIN | BEL | GRE | NZL; 10 | ESP | JPN | 35th | 1 |

==== World Rally Championship-2 results ====
| Year | Car | 1 | 2 | 3 | 4 | 5 | 6 | 7 | 8 | 9 | 10 | 11 | 12 | 13 | Pos. | Pts |
|---|---|---|---|---|---|---|---|---|---|---|---|---|---|---|---|---|
| 2022 | Škoda Fabia R5/Rally2 evo | MON | SWE | CRO | POR | ITA | KEN | EST | FIN | BEL | GRE | NZL; 4 | ESP | JPN | 29th | 12 |

==== FIA WRC2 Junior Championship results ====
| Year | Car | 1 | 2 | 3 | 4 | 5 | 6 | 7 | 8 | 9 | 10 | 11 | 12 | 13 | Pos. | Pts |
|---|---|---|---|---|---|---|---|---|---|---|---|---|---|---|---|---|
| 2022 | Škoda Fabia R5/Rally2 evo | MON | SWE | CRO | POR | ITA | KEN | EST | FIN | BEL | GRE | NZL; 1 | ESP | JPN | 15th | 25 |

=== Circuit racing ===
| Season | Series | Position | Car | Team |
|---|---|---|---|---|
| 2017 | Australian Toyota 86 Racing Series | 40th | Toyota 86 | Toyota Racing Australia |
| 2018 | Australian Toyota 86 Racing Series | 49th | Toyota 86 | Toyota Racing Australia |
| 2019 | Australian Toyota 86 Racing Series | 44th | Toyota 86 | Toyota Racing Australia |
| 2020 | Australian Toyota 86 Racing Series | – (Note: Cancelled due to Covid-19 pandemic) | Toyota 86 | Toyota Racing Australia |
| 2021 | Australian Toyota 86 Racing Series | – (Note: Not enough rounds were held to declare championship results.) | Toyota 86 | Toyota Racing Australia |
| 2022 | Australian Toyota 86 Racing Series | 41st | Toyota 86 | Toyota Racing Australia |
| 2023 | Australian Toyota 86 Racing Series | ? | Toyota 86 | Toyota Racing Australia |
| 2024 | Australian Toyota 86 Racing Series | ? | Toyota 86 | Toyota Racing Australia |
| 2026 | Australian Toyota 86 Racing Series | 39th | Toyota 86 | Toyota Racing Australia |

== Notes ==
Sporting positions
| Preceded by Eli Evans | Winner of the Australian Rally Championship; 2019 & 2021 | Succeeded by Lewis Bates |
| Preceded by Lewis Bates | Winner of the Australian Rally Championship; 2023 - 2024 | Succeeded by Incumbent |
Awards and achievements
| Preceded by Anton De Pasquale | Peter Brock Medal; 2019 | Succeeded by Alex Peroni |
