= Coral Taylor =

Australian rally co-driver (born 1961)

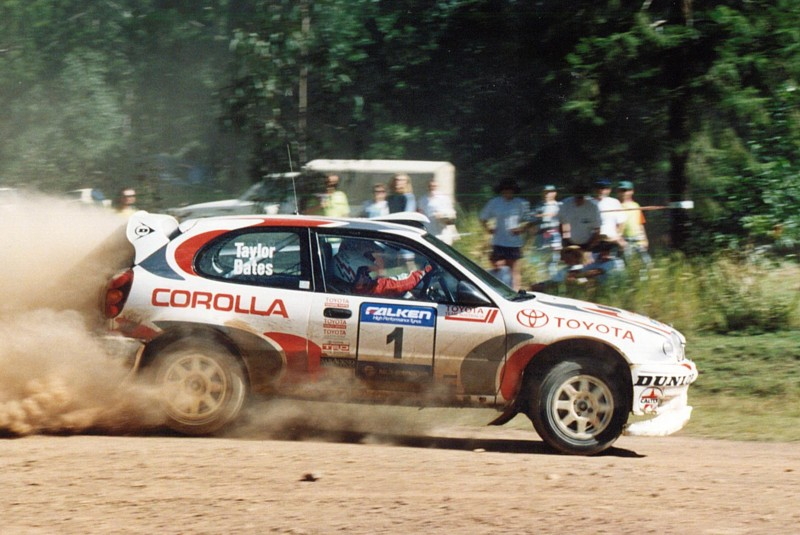
Coral Taylor with Neal Bates (Rally Queensland 1998)

Coral Pamela Taylor (born 1961) is an Australian rally co-driver. Taylor comes from a strong rallying family, she is the daughter of veteran rally driver Norm Fritter, married to former Australian Championship driver Mark Taylor and mother to 2016 Australian Rally Champion Molly Taylor.

She began her motorsport career at the age of 18, when she co-drove for her father, Norm Fritter, in the 1979 Repco Round Australia Trial, sparking a passion that lives to this day. She won her first rally as co-driver for Peter Glennie in 1986, and in 1993 she teamed up with Neal Bates and Toyota, and began to rewrite the local rally records.

The two won the Australian Rally Championship the first year (1993), then backed that up with wins in the following two years as well, becoming the first team to ever win 3 consecutive championships outright (Ross dunkerton drew for first in 1977, breaking his hat-trick).

In 1995, as well as winning their 3rd ARC championship, Neal and Coral also finished 1st outright in the Targa Tasmania tarmac rally. In the next six years there were numerous rally wins, and five second and one 3rd place in the ARC Championship. Also in this period was 3 consecutive 1st-in-class in the Targa Tasmania (1999–2001) in a Lexus IS200. 1997 saw a change of equipment, when they switched from the Toyota Celica GT4 to the Toyota Corolla WRC (3rd that year)

In 2001, after winning their fifth 2nd place, due to new rules and regulations concerning vehicles, they were forced to take a year off while a new car was built by the team (Their Toyota Corolla WRC car no longer met regulations). They returned in 2003 in a new Corolla Group N Prototype, and finished 6th in the 2004 and 2005 championships, before returning to the podium with another 2nd in 2006.

2007 saw them in another new car, this time a Corolla Super 2000, and they become the first pair to win stages and finish on the podium in a S2000 spec car, and they finished 2nd in the championship for the 7th time, bringing their total to 11 podium finishes in 15 years

Taylor has acted as co-driver for Neal Bates for 18 years, covering much of his rally career, and in several appearances on the World Rally Championship during the 1990s in Toyota Celica GT-Fours and Toyota Corolla WRCs.

She won the Australian Rally Championship with Neal Bates in 1993, 1994 and 1995, placed second in the 1996, 1998, 1999, 2000, 2001, 2006 and 2007 championships, and Third in 1997. In November 2008 Taylor and Bates won their fourth Australian Championships.

Taylor returned to national-level rallying in 2023, co-driving with Harry Bates, Neil’s son. They won the 2023 Australian Rally Championship, Taylor’s fifth ARC championship as a co-driver. The pairing will also contest the 2024 championship with the Toyota factory team.
